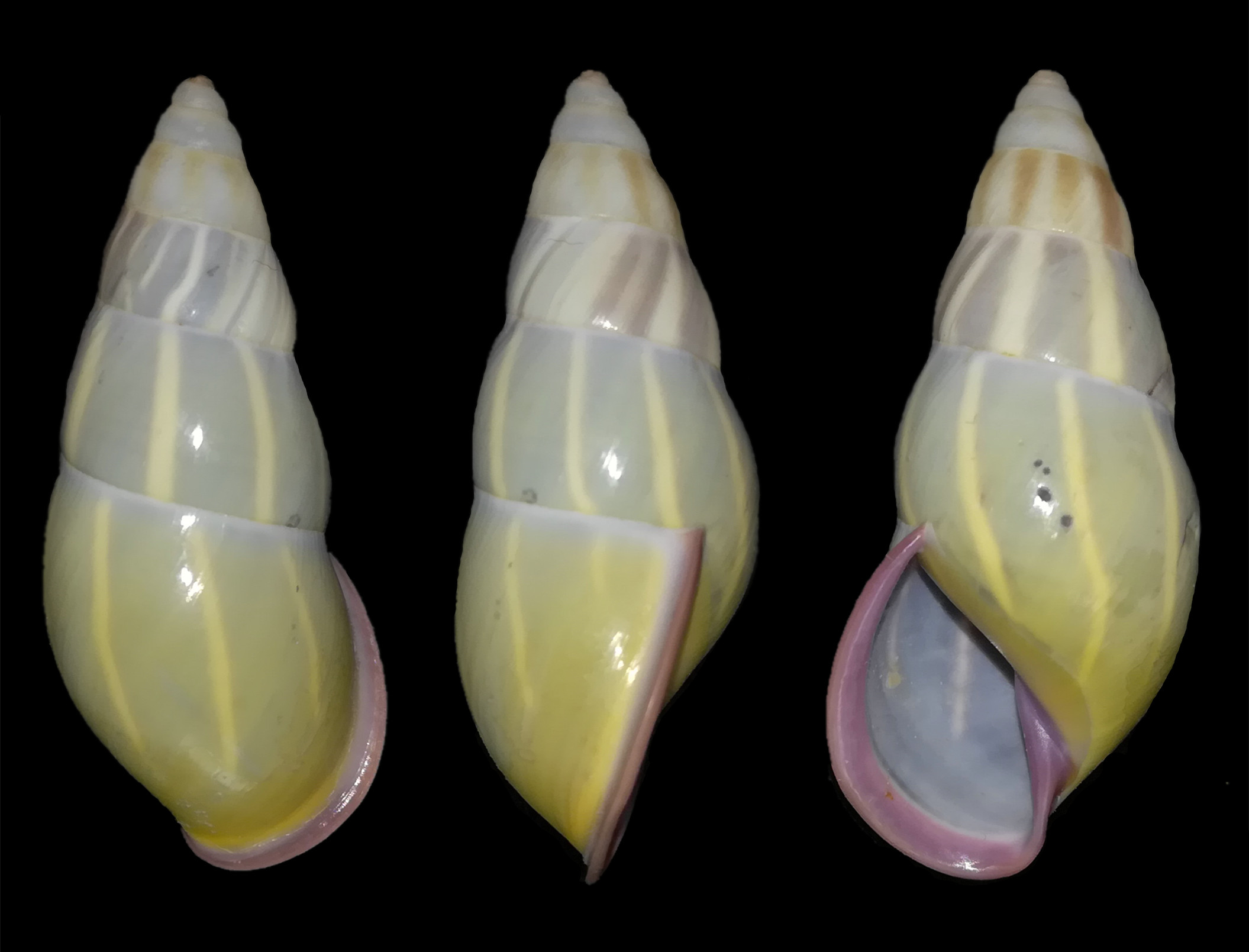

Scientific classification
- Kingdom: Animalia
- Phylum: Mollusca
- Class: Gastropoda
- Order: Stylommatophora
- Family: Camaenidae
- Genus: Amphidromus
- Species: A. ngocanhi

Binomial name
- Amphidromus ngocanhi Thach, 2017

= Amphidromus ngocanhi =

Species of gastropod

Amphidromus ngocanhi is a species of slender air-breathing tree snail, an arboreal gastropod mollusk in the family Camaenidae.

This is a taxon inquirendum (debated synonym)

== Habitat ==
Amphidromus ngocanhi can be found on trees.

== Distribution ==
Amphidromus ngocanhi can be found in Đắk Nông Province, Central Vietnam.

== Etymology ==
This species is named after Phạm Ngọc Anh from Vietnam who provided the type material.
