= Quảng Khê (disambiguation) =

Quảng Khê is a rural commune of Lâm Đồng province, Vietnam.

Quảng Khê may also refer to several places in Vietnam:

- Quảng Khê, Bắc Kạn, a former rural commune of Ba Bể District
- Quảng Khê, Thanh Hóa, a former rural commune of Quảng Xương District.
