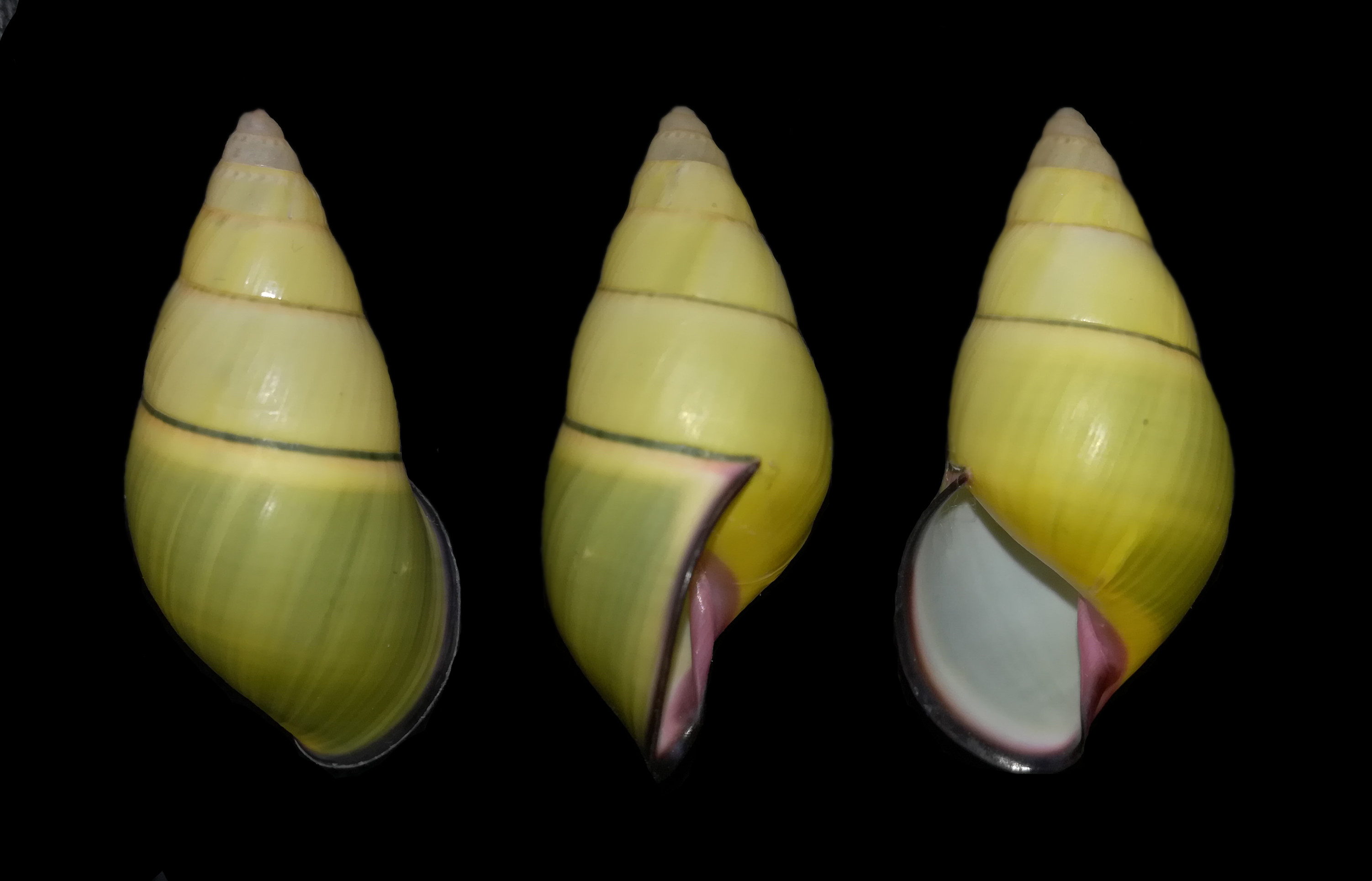
- Shell of Amphidromus daoae

Scientific classification
- Kingdom: Animalia
- Phylum: Mollusca
- Class: Gastropoda
- Order: Stylommatophora
- Family: Camaenidae
- Genus: Amphidromus
- Species: A. daoae

Binomial name
- Amphidromus daoae Thach, 2016

Synonyms
- Amphidromus (Syndromus) daoae Thach, 2016 alternative representation

= Amphidromus daoae =

Species of snail in the family Camaenidae

Amphidromus daoae is a species of medium-sized air-breathing tree snail, an arboreal gastropod mollusk in the family Camaenidae.

Subspecies

- Amphidromus daoae daoae Thach, 2016
- Amphidromus daoae robertabbasi Thach, 2017

== Distribution ==
Amphidromus daoae is found in Đắk Lắk Province, Central Vietnam.

== Habitat ==
It is found on the ground, among leaf litter.

== Etymology ==
This species is named after Lê Vũ Hồng Đào for providing the type material.
