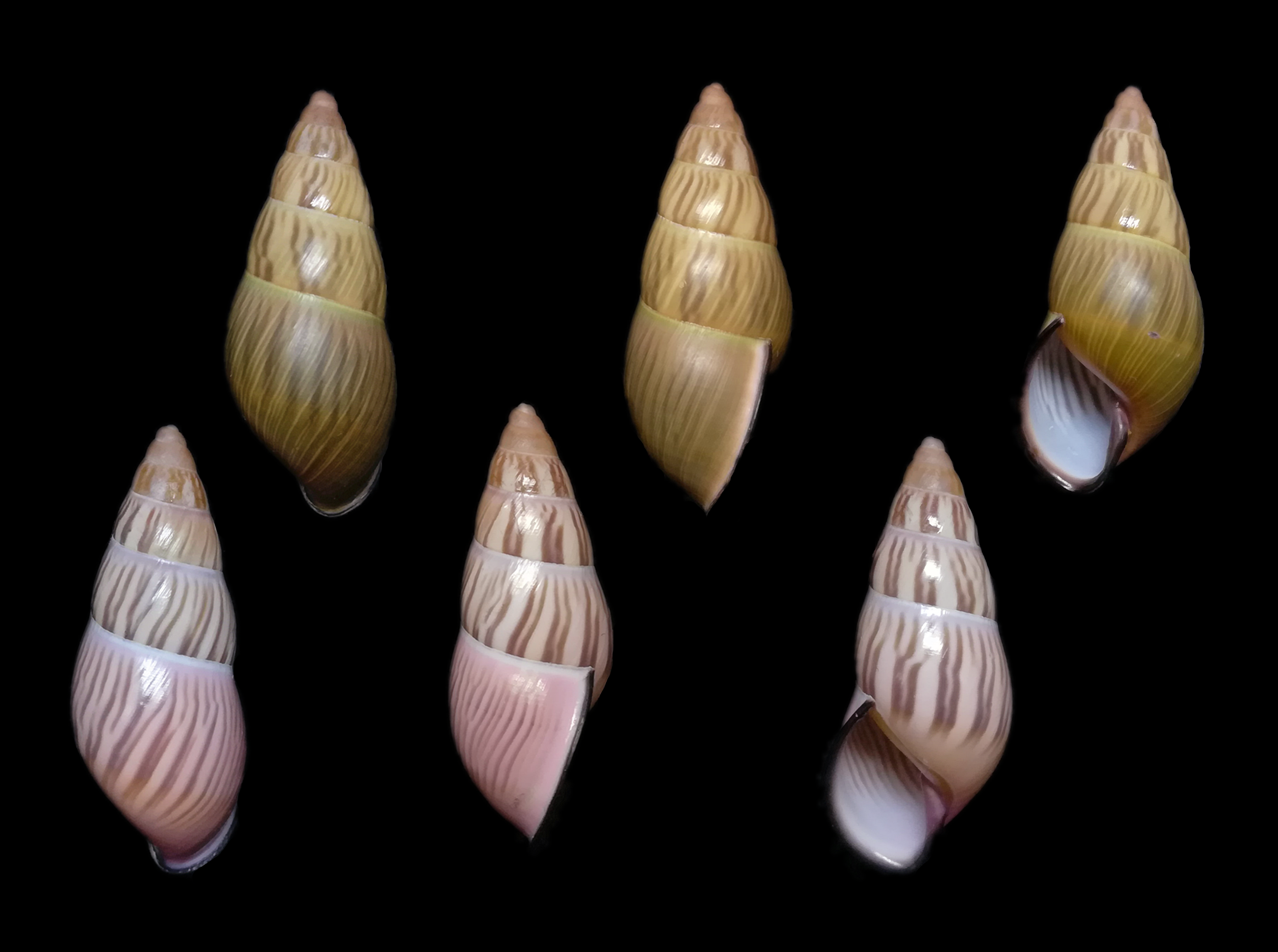

Scientific classification
- Kingdom: Animalia
- Phylum: Mollusca
- Class: Gastropoda
- Order: Stylommatophora
- Family: Camaenidae
- Genus: Amphidromus
- Species: A. smithii

Binomial name
- Amphidromus smithii Fulton, 1896

Synonyms
- Amphidromus (Amphidromus) noriokowasoei Thach & F. Huber, 2017 (junior synonym); Amphidromus (Syndromus) smithii Fulton, 1896 alternative representation; Amphidromus baerorum Thach, 2017 junior subjective synonym; Amphidromus christabaerae Thach, 2017 junior subjective synonym; Amphidromus davidmonsecouri Thach, 2018 junior subjective synonym; Amphidromus davidmonsecouri davidmonsecouri Thach, 2018 junior subjective synonym; Amphidromus eboricolor Thach, 2018 junior subjective synonym; Amphidromus gittenbergeri Thach & F. Huber, 2018 junior subjective synonym; Amphidromus hassi hassi Thach & F. Huber, 2018 ·; Amphidromus hassi ngoanmucensis Thach & F. Huber, 2018 (junior synonym); Amphidromus noriokowasoei Thach & F. Huber, 2017 · > junior subjective synonym; Amphidromus noriokowasoei noriokowasoei Thach & F. Huber, 2017 junior subjective synonym; Amphidromus semicinereus Thach, 2018 junior subjective synonym; Amphidromus smithii smithii Fulton, 1896 (no subspecies are recognized); Amphidromus smithii ventrosulus Möllendorff, 1900 junior subjective synonym; Amphidromus steveni Thach, 2017 (junior synonym); Amphidromus tedbaeri Thach, 2017 junior subjective synonym; Amphidromus ventrosulus Möllendorff, 1900 junior subjective synonym

= Amphidromus smithii =

Species of gastropod

Amphidromus smithii is a species of medium-sized air-breathing tree snail, an arboreal gastropod mollusk in the family Camaenidae.

== Description ==
The height of the shell attains 39 mm, its diameter 17 mm.

(Original description) A sinistral shell, oblong-conical in form, imperforate, and relatively thin, exhibits a white base coloration. The suture is deeply impressed and subtly crenulated. The ultimate one and a half whorls are marked with closely spaced oblique green lines, which are intersected by fine spiral lines of a deeper hue. A slender dark green band along the suture of the lower whorls transitions to yellow towards the apex. The shell consists of seven subtly convex whorls, with the third whorl featuring two spiral rows of light brown spots. The columella is straight and minimally expanded at its upper end. The outer lip is narrowly flared and reflected. Both the lip and columella display a dark brown coloration.

== Distribution ==
Lâm Đồng Province and Đăk Nông Province, Vietnam.

== Habitat ==
On trees.
