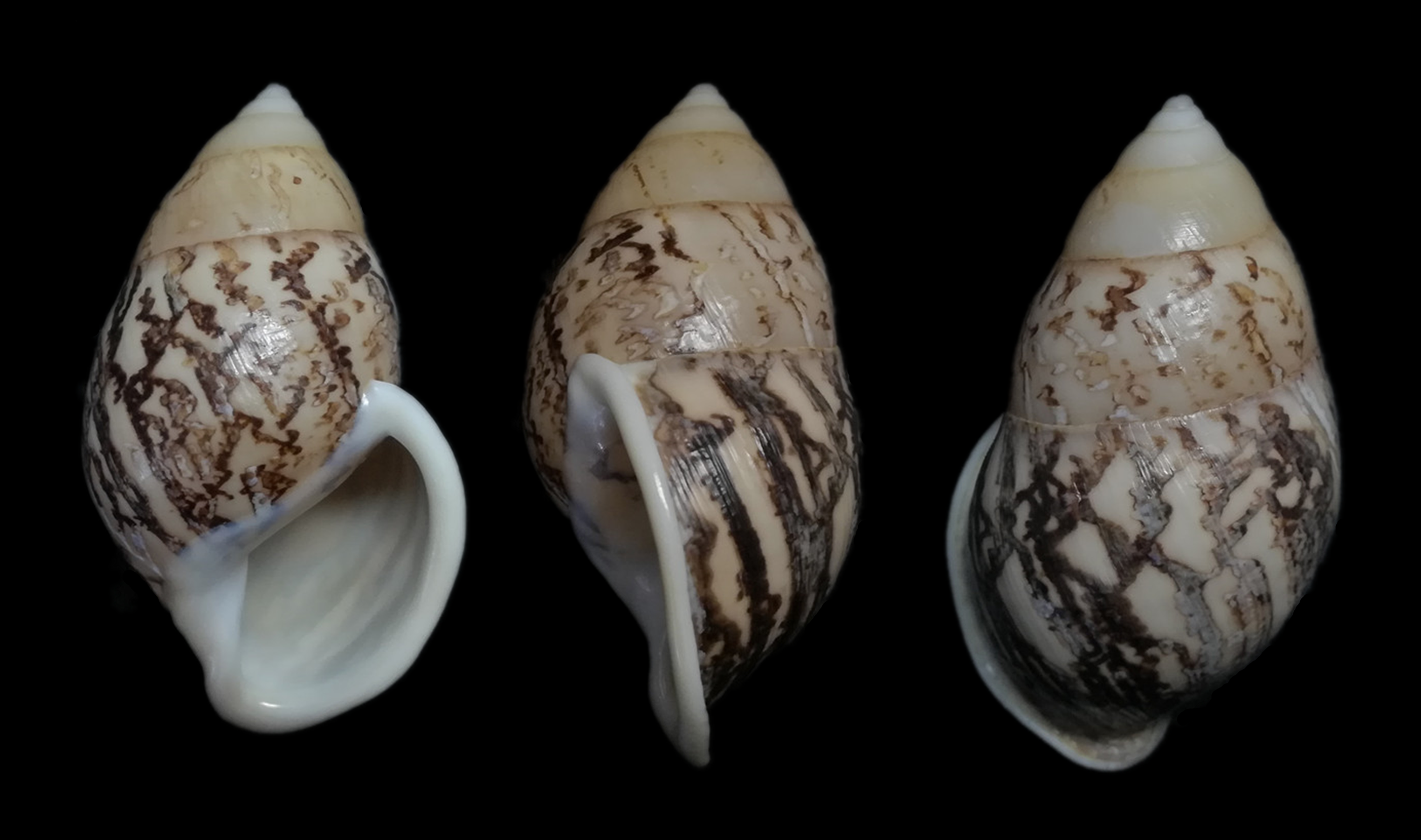

Scientific classification
- Kingdom: Animalia
- Phylum: Mollusca
- Class: Gastropoda
- Order: Stylommatophora
- Family: Camaenidae
- Genus: Amphidromus
- Species: A. buelowi

Binomial name
- Amphidromus buelowi Fruhstorfer, 1905

Synonyms
- Amphidromus (Amphidromus) asper F. Haas, 1934 alternative representation; Amphidromus (Goniodromus) asper F. Haas, 1934 (basionym); Amphidromus (Goniodromus) buelowi Fruhstorfer, 1905 alternative representation; Amphidromus (Goniodromus) bulowi Fruhstorfer, 1905 (incorrect subsequent spelling); Amphidromus (Goniodromus) bülowi Fruhstorfer, 1905 (correction of diacritical mark mandatory); Amphidromus asper F. Haas, 1934 junior subjective synonym; Amphidromus bulowi Fruhstorfer, 1905 misspelling - incorrect subsequent spelling; Amphidromus bülowi Fruhstorfer, 1905 (correction of diacritical mark mandatory); Amphidromus franzhuberi Thach, 2016 junior subjective synonym

= Amphidromus buelowi =

Species of gastropod

Amphidromus buelowi is a species of large-sized air-breathing tree snail, an arboreal gastropod mollusk in the family Camaenidae.

Subspecies

- Amphidromus buelowi buelowi Fruhstorfer, 1905
- Amphidromus buelowi malalakensis J. Parsons & Abbas, 2016

== Description ==
The height of the shell varies between 45.3 mm and 51.1 mm, its width between 26.2 mm and 26.6 mm

This chirally dimorphic species has large-sized swollen yellow-brown shell with black zigzag lines.

(Original description in German) The shell consists of 7 flattened whorls with a gray ground color, transitioning to yellowish in younger specimens, marked by broad, randomly intersecting black zigzag lines. The aperture lip is wide and white. The characteristic angularity is evident on the body whorl's anterior margin as a prominent keel.

== Distribution ==
This species occurs in Sumatra, Indonesia and in Đắk Lắk Province, Central Vietnam.
