= Đăk Mil district =

Coordinates: 12°31′08″N 107°42′24″E

Đắk Mil district Huyện Đắk Mil
- District
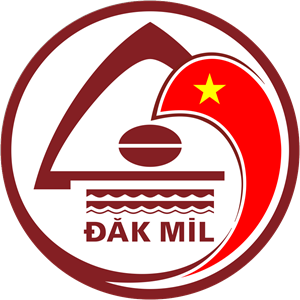
- Seal
- Interactive map of Đắk Mil district
- Country: Vietnam
- Region: Central Highlands
- Province: Đắk Nông
- Capital: Đắk Mil

Population (2020)
  - Total: 100,702
- Time zone: UTC+7 (Indochina Time)

Đắk Mil was a former rural district of Đắk Nông province in the Central Highlands region of Vietnam. As of 2020 the district had a population of 100,702. The district covers an area of 679,02 km^{2}. The district capital lies at Đăk Mil. The ethnic composition of Đăk Mil is quite diversified: there are 19 ethnic groups. Vietnamese people represent 79,378 people, accounting for 80% of the district, while ethnic minorities number 21,324. 8.6% of the total population are from the M'Nong ethnic minority. The small Ede (4 households / 31 people) and Mạ (1 household) groups are also present. A total of 2,037 households / 9,400 people are ethnic minorities. There are three main religions in the district: Catholicism, Buddhism and Protestantism.
