= Quảng Khê =

Quảng Khê Xã Quảng Khê
- Rural commune
- Quảng Khê commune
- Location within Vietnam
- Coordinates: 11°54′34″N 107°47′46″E
- Country: Vietnam
- Region: Central Highlands
- Province: Lâm Đồng
- Time zone: UTC+7 (UTC + 7)

Quảng Khê is a rural commune (xã) of Lâm Đồng Province, Vietnam. It is one of the 124 new wards, communes and special zones of the province following the reorganization in 2025.

On June 16, 2025, the Standing Committee of the National Assembly issued Resolution No. 1671/NQ-UBTVQH15 on the arrangement of commune-level administrative units in Lâm Đồng province in 2025. Accordingly, the entire natural area and population of Đắk Plao commune and Quảng Khê commune (Đắk Glong district) were merged to form a new commune named Quảng Khê Commune.
