= Gia Nghĩa =

- Provincial city (Class-3)
- Gia Nghĩa City; Thành phố Gia Nghĩa
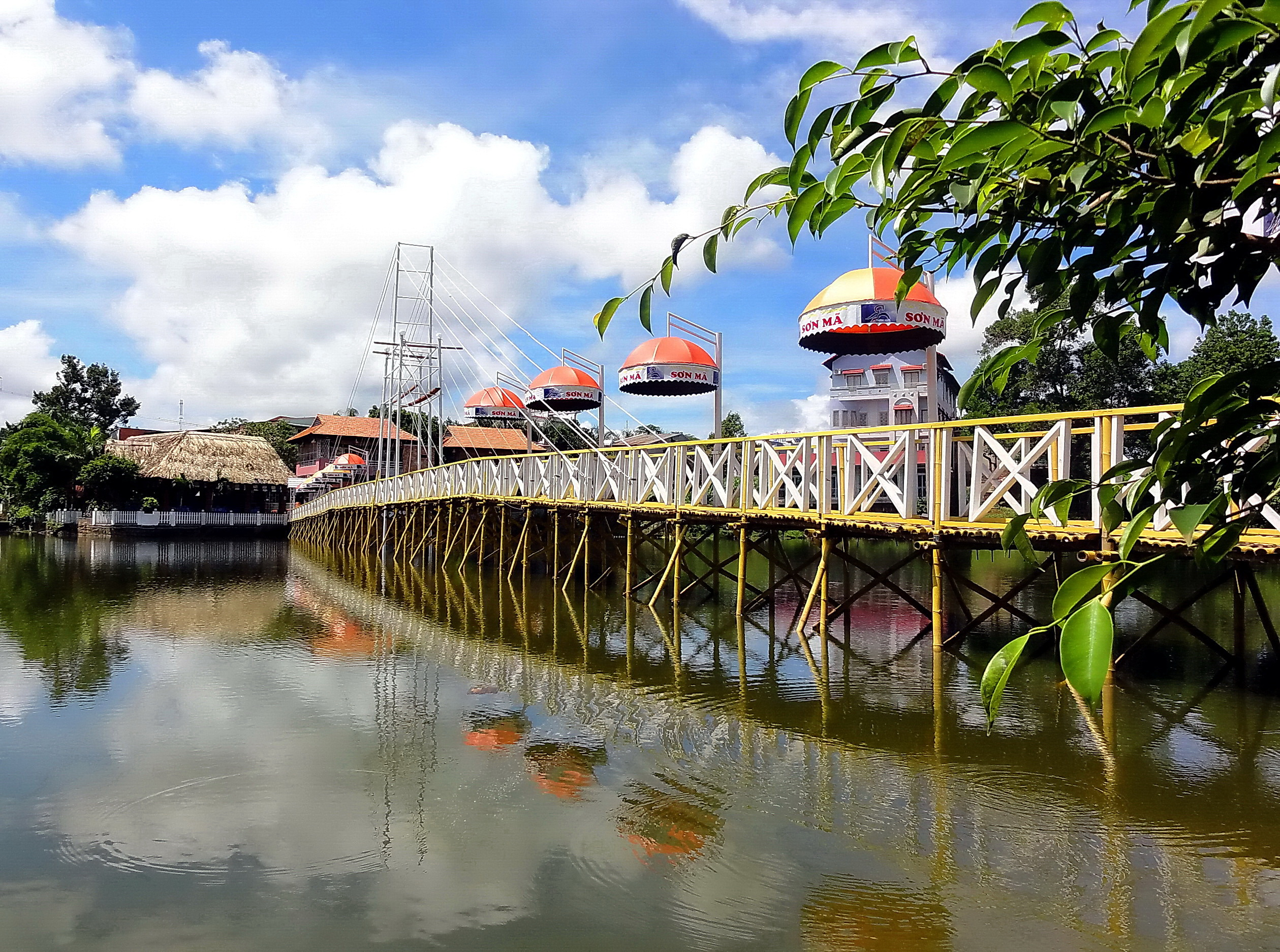
- A tourist area in Gia Nghia city
- Interactive map of Gia Nghĩa
- Location of Gia Nghĩa in Vietnam
- Coordinates: 11°59′N 107°42′E
- Country: Vietnam
- Province: Đắk Nông Province
- Established: 2004

Area
  - Total: 284.11 km^{2} (109.70 sq mi)

Population (2019)
  - Total: 85.082
- Time zone: UTC+7 (Indochina Time)

Gia Nghĩa is the provincial city of Đắk Nông Province, in the Central Highlands of Vietnam. It is located on the main road northward to Buôn Ma Thuột which is 120 km away. .

== Name ==
Its present name Gia Nghĩa from the original name in Jarai language: Yăgrai (means "the water dragon"). It was changed by President Ngô Đình Diệm's policy in 1957.

== Climate ==
Climate data for Gia Nghĩa, elevation 660 m (2,170 ft)
Month	Jan	Feb	Mar	Apr	May	Jun	Jul	Aug	Sep	Oct	Nov	Dec	Year
Record high °C (°F)	33.5 (92.3)	35.7 (96.3)	37.1 (98.8)	37.1 (98.8)	35.6 (96.1)	33.5 (92.3)	33.0 (91.4)	33.0 (91.4)	33.2 (91.8)	32.4 (90.3)	33.0 (91.4)	32.9 (91.2)	37.1 (98.8)
Mean daily maximum °C (°F)	28.4 (83.1)	30.5 (86.9)	31.9 (89.4)	31.9 (89.4)	30.6 (87.1)	28.9 (84.0)	28.3 (82.9)	28.0 (82.4)	28.4 (83.1)	28.7 (83.7)	28.0 (82.4)	27.0 (80.6)	29.2 (84.6)
Daily mean °C (°F)	20.5 (68.9)	21.8 (71.2)	23.3 (73.9)	24.2 (75.6)	24.2 (75.6)	23.6 (74.5)	23.1 (73.6)	23.0 (73.4)	23.1 (73.6)	22.8 (73.0)	22.2 (72.0)	20.8 (69.4)	22.7 (72.9)
Mean daily minimum °C (°F)	15.2 (59.4)	15.8 (60.4)	17.8 (64.0)	19.6 (67.3)	20.9 (69.6)	20.8 (69.4)	20.5 (68.9)	20.6 (69.1)	20.4 (68.7)	19.5 (67.1)	18.6 (65.5)	16.8 (62.2)	18.9 (66.0)
Record low °C (°F)	7.6 (45.7)	7.8 (46.0)	9.5 (49.1)	13.2 (55.8)	17.0 (62.6)	16.6 (61.9)	17.1 (62.8)	17.0 (62.6)	16.2 (61.2)	11.4 (52.5)	10.7 (51.3)	8.3 (46.9)	7.6 (45.7)
Average rainfall mm (inches)	16.6 (0.65)	34.6 (1.36)	101.7 (4.00)	171.7 (6.76)	271.6 (10.69)	319.4 (12.57)	397.2 (15.64)	439.1 (17.29)	400.9 (15.78)	256.7 (10.11)	78.1 (3.07)	20.3 (0.80)	2,511 (98.86)
Average rainy days	2.8	4.3	10.2	14.8	22.2	24.6	26.8	28.0	26.8	21.1	9.7	3.9	196.3
Average relative humidity (%)	76.1	74.5	75.7	80.4	85.5	88.8	88.5	90.2	89.9	86.3	82.5	79.0	83.1
Mean monthly sunshine hours	251.3	240.6	250.4	222.7	190.2	146.3	142.3	126.5	125.9	163.6	193.4	223.5	2,279
Source: Vietnam Institute for Building Science and Technology

== Transport ==
In terms of air travel, Gia Nghĩa does not have its own airport with the nearest airports located in neighbouring provinces: Buon Ma Thuot Airport in Đắk Lắk which is approximately 126 km and Lien Khuong International Airport in Lâm Đồng which is approximately 156 km from Gia Nghĩa.

== Gallery ==
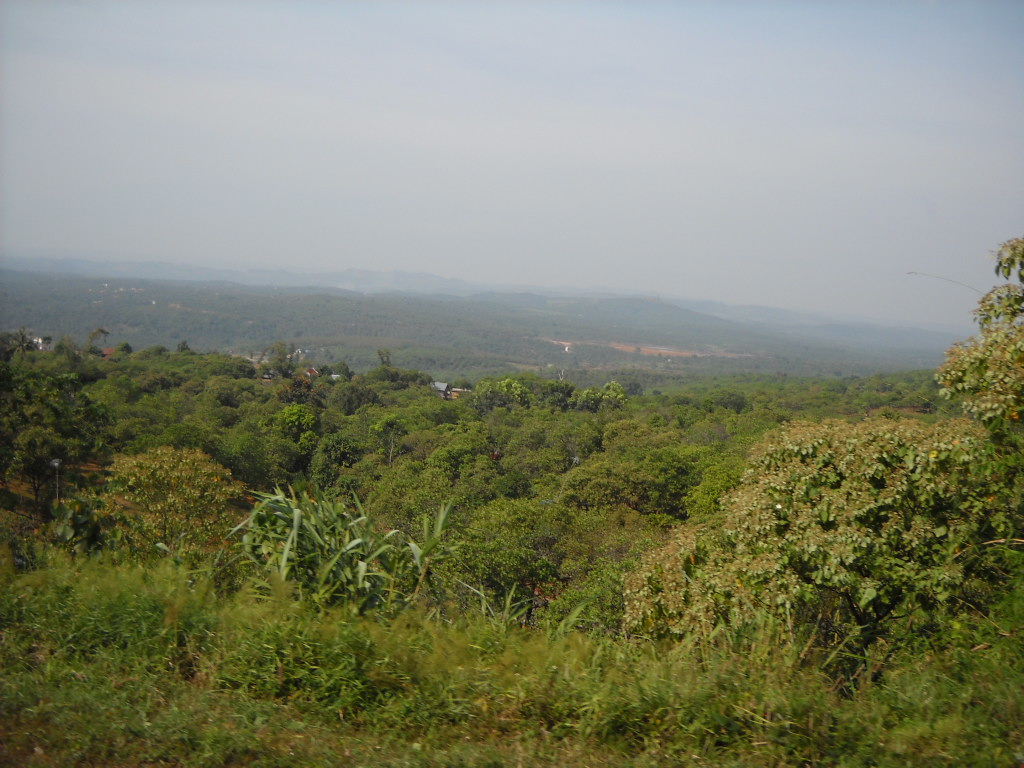
File:Cao_nguyên_Mơ_Nông,_Đắk_Nông.jpgMơ Nông Plateau, Đắk Nông

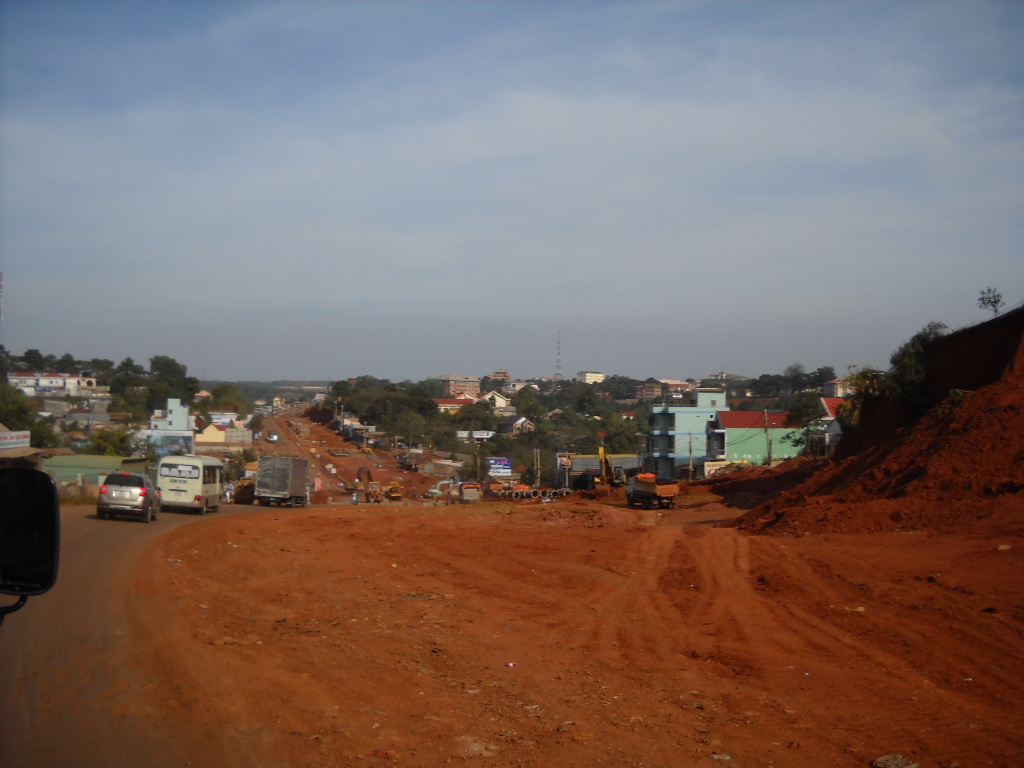
File:TX.Gia_Nghĩa,_Đắk_Nông..jpgNational Highway 14 section through Gia Nghĩa city

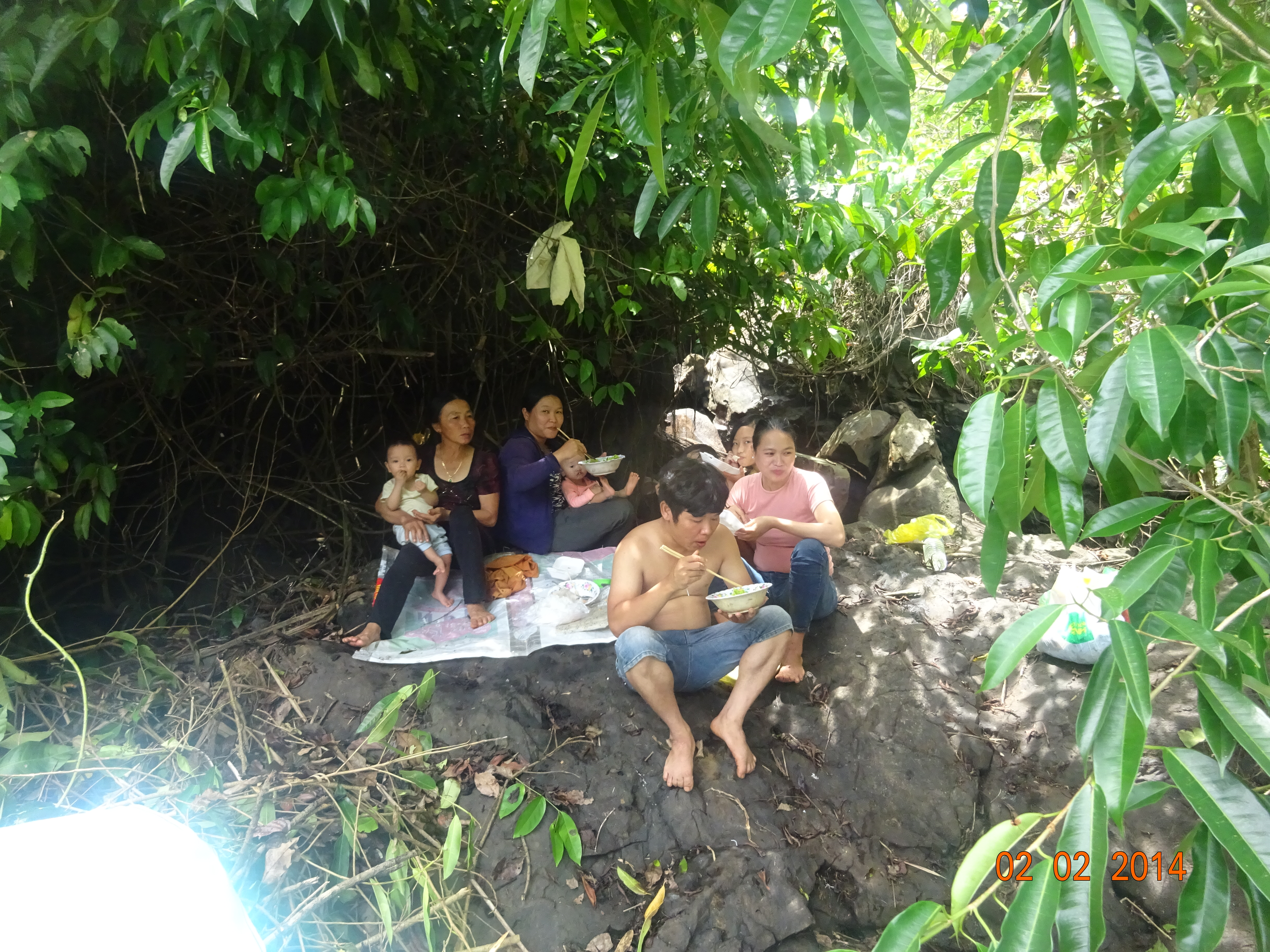
File:Trải_nghiệm_Thác_Gia_vĩ.jpg
