= Đăk Glong district =

Đắk Glong district Huyện Đắk Glong
- District
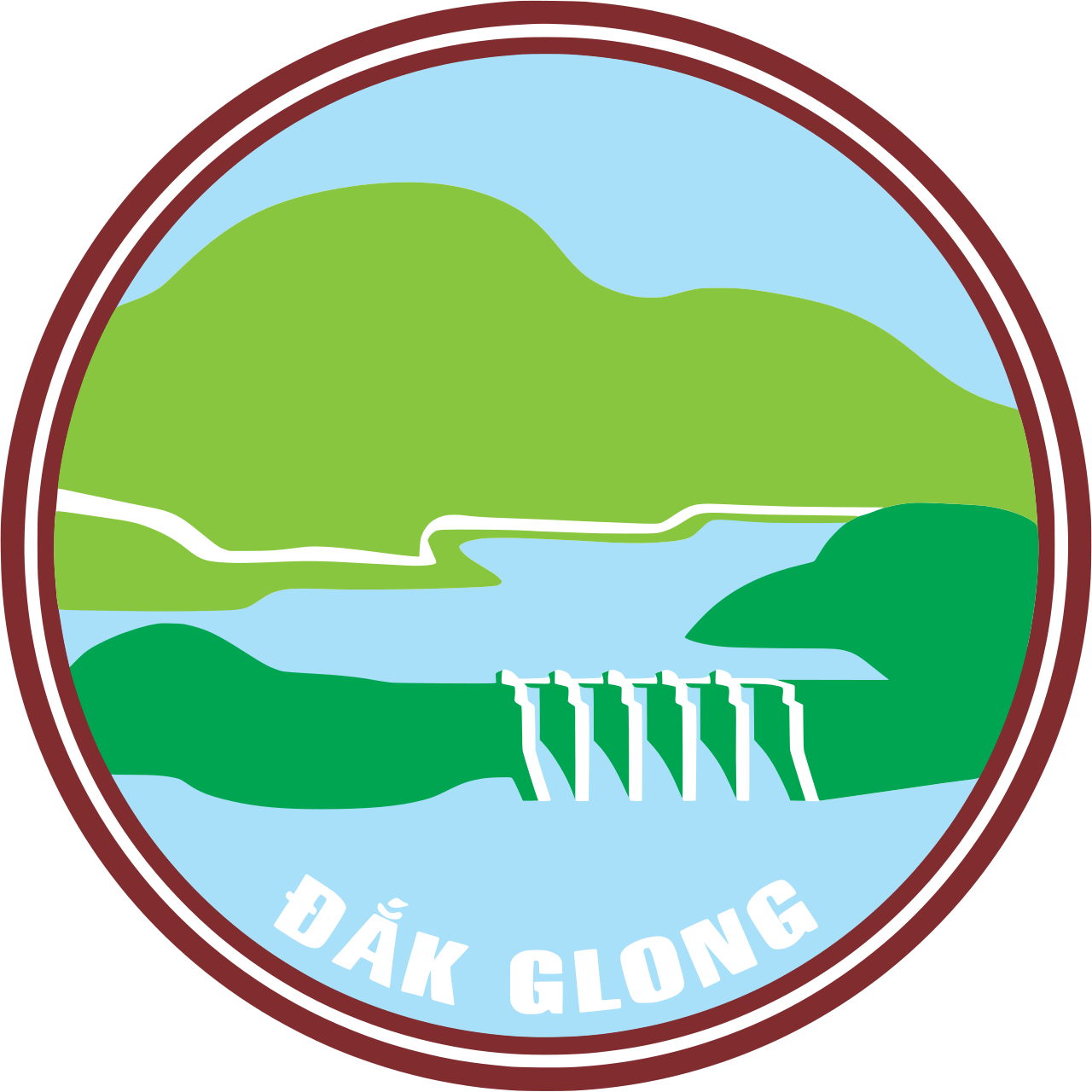
- Seal
- Country: Vietnam
- Region: Central Highlands
- Province: Đắk Nông
- Established: 2005

Area
  - Total: 559.11 sq mi (1,448.08 km^{2})

Population (2020)
  - Total: 73.851
- Time zone: UTC+7 (Indochina Time)

Đắk Glong is a rural district of Đắk Nông province in the Central Highlands region of Vietnam. The district is home to the largest H'mong community in Đắk Nông, who migrated from the North in recent decades.

== Name ==
Its name Đắc Long from Daàk-klăung what means "the spring of the dragon" in Mnong language.
