= Đắk Nông province =

Province of Vietnam

Đắk Nông Quảng Đức
- Province
- Đắk Nông province
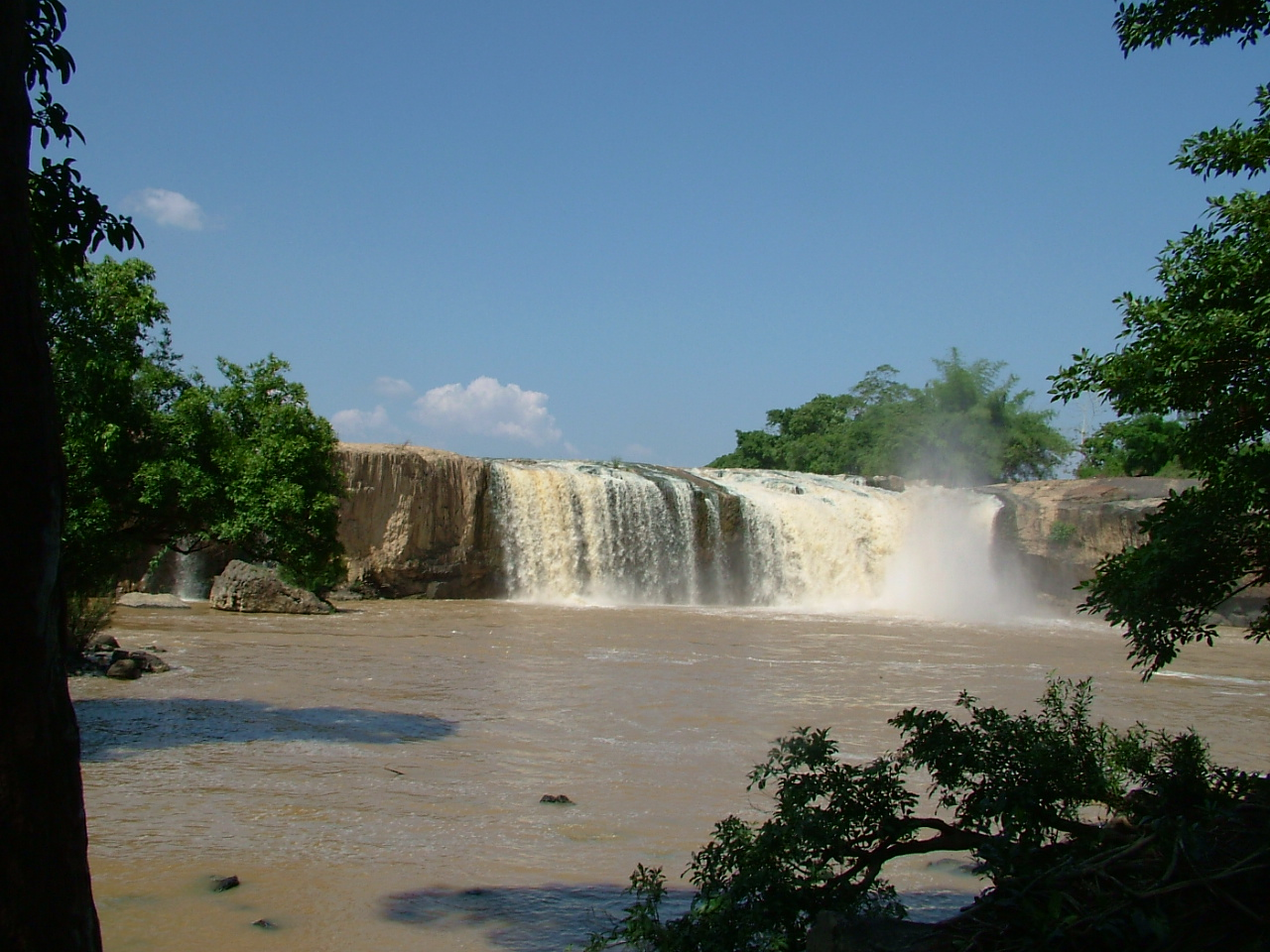
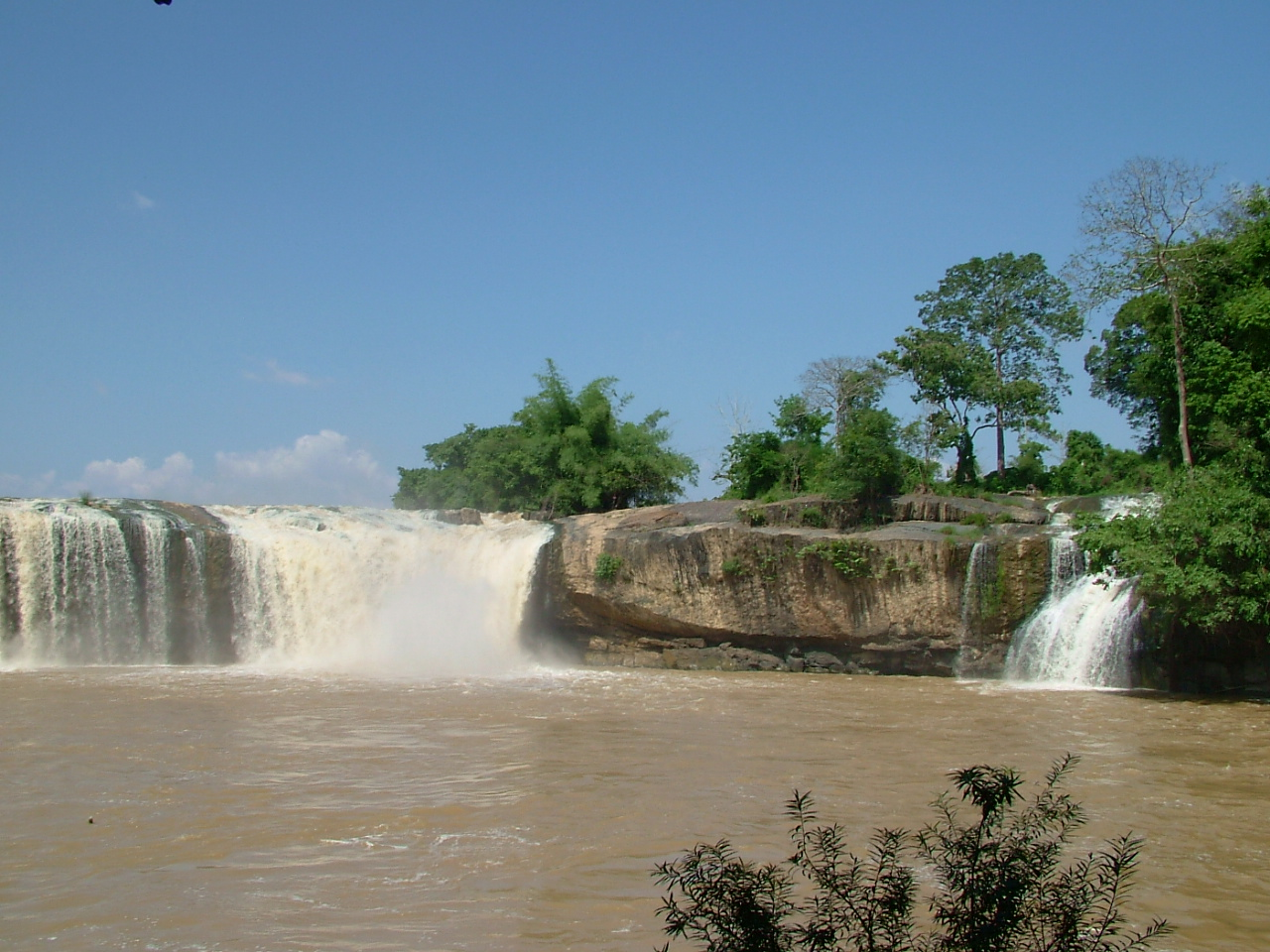
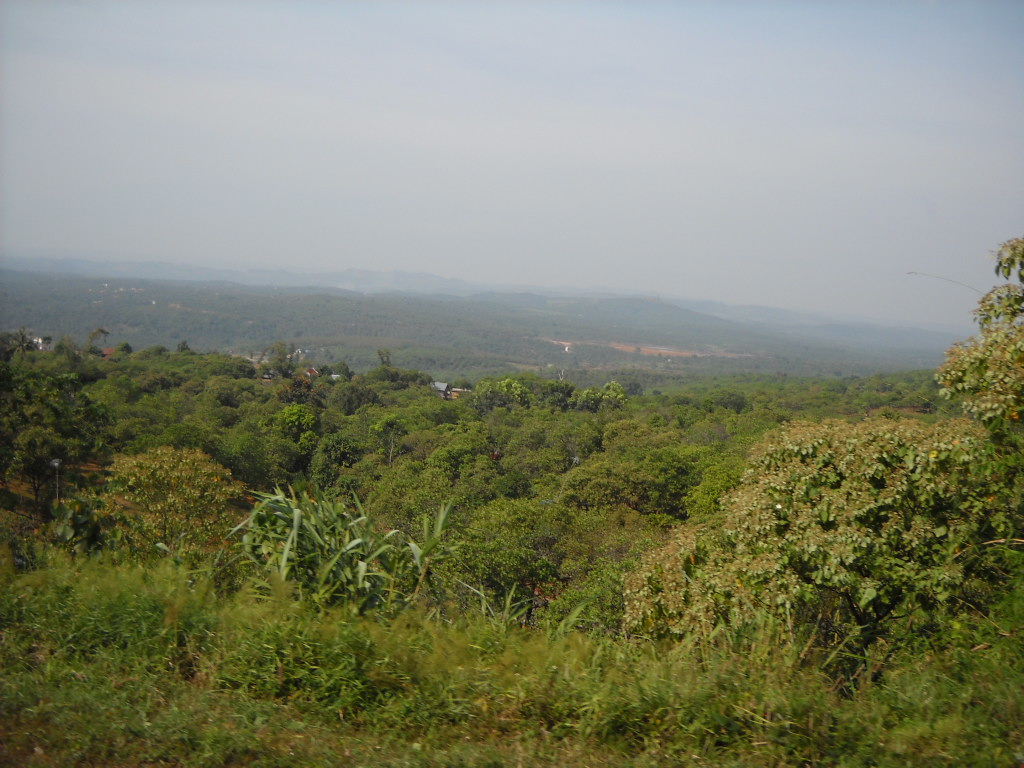
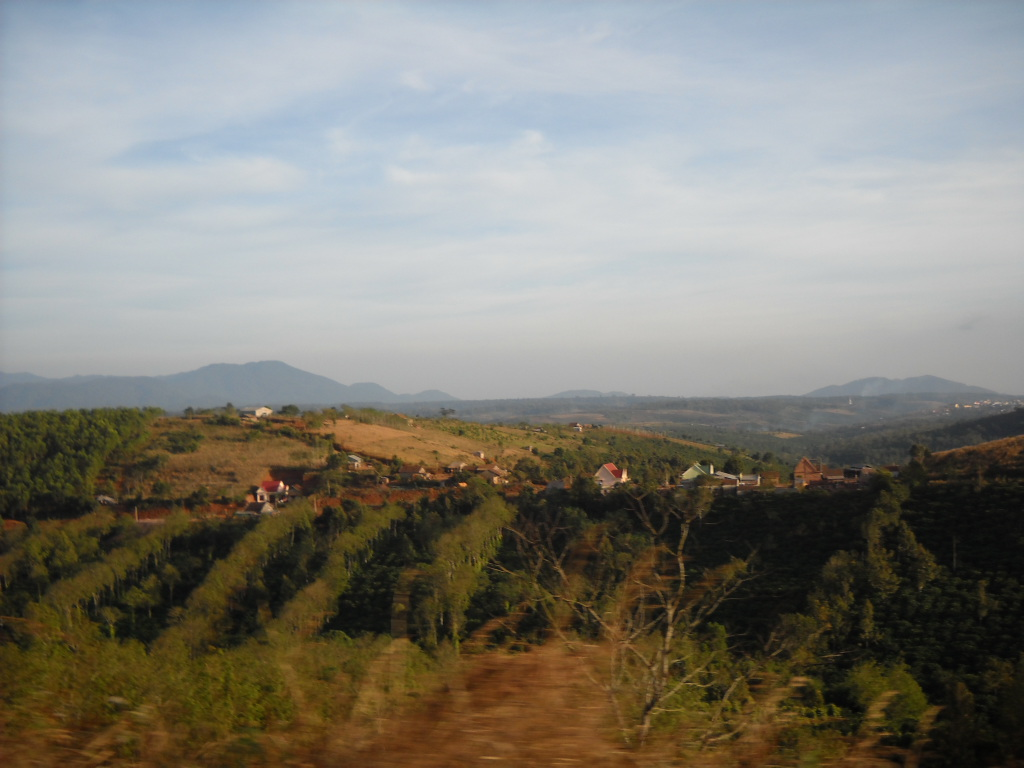
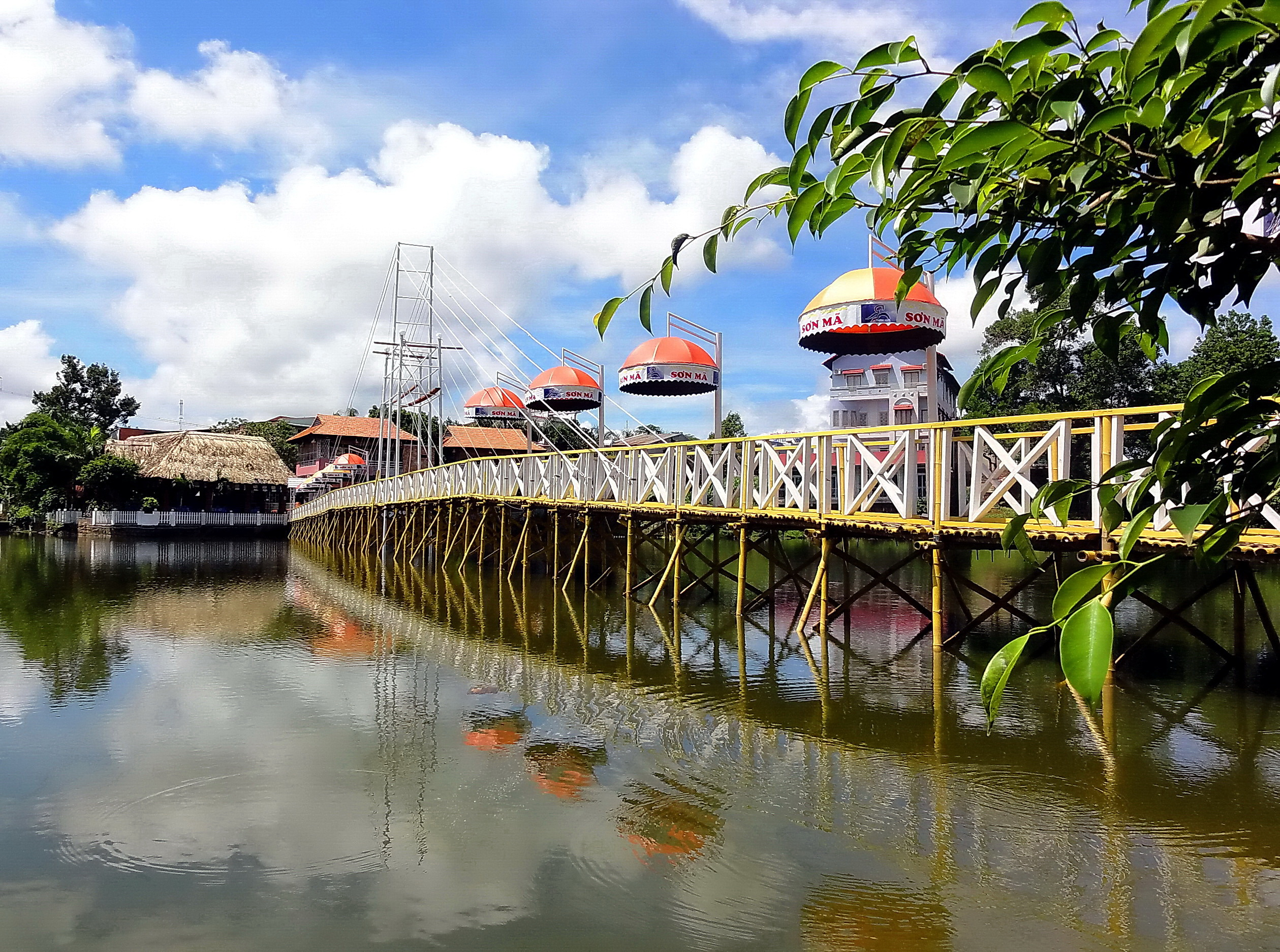
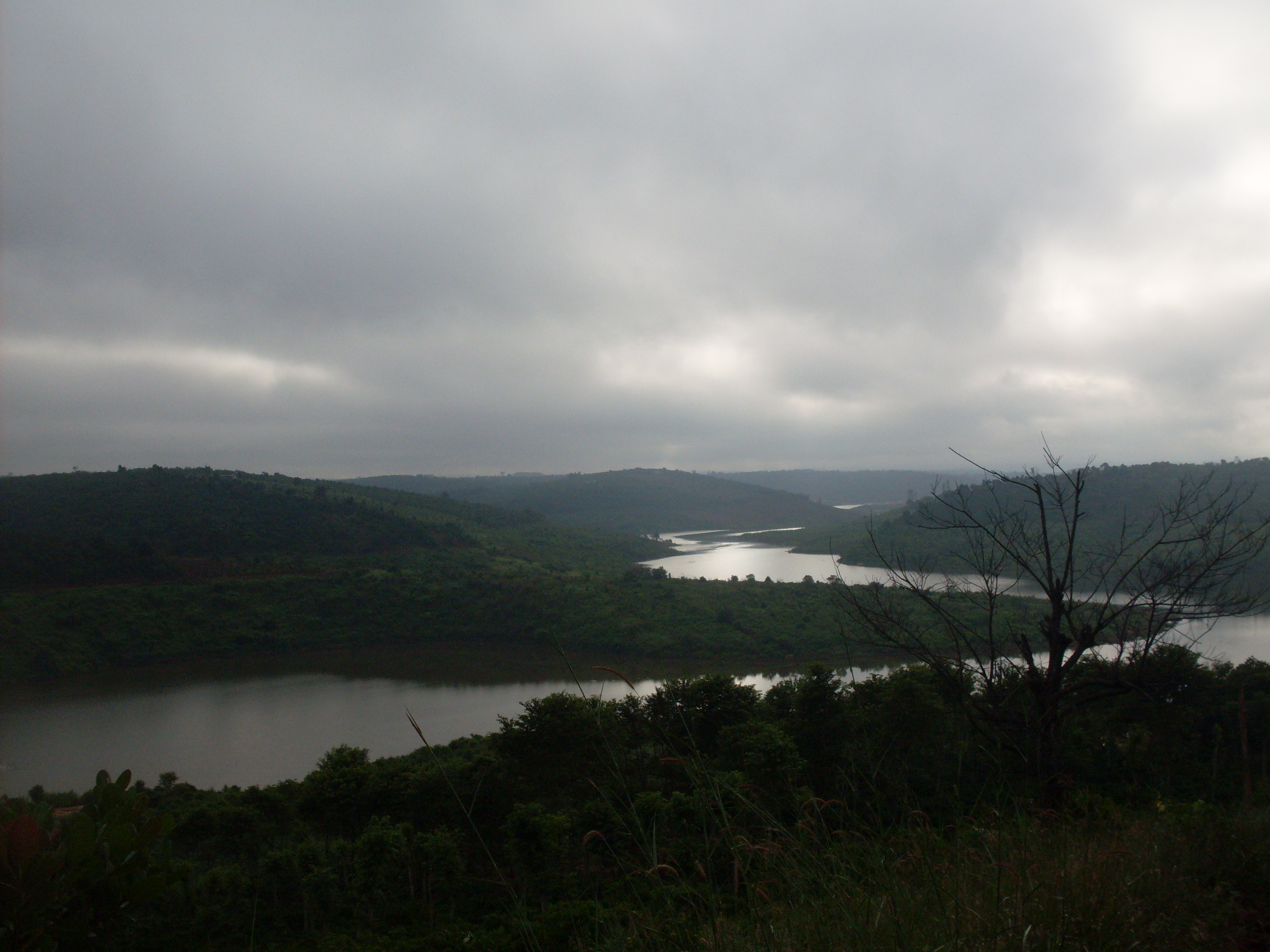
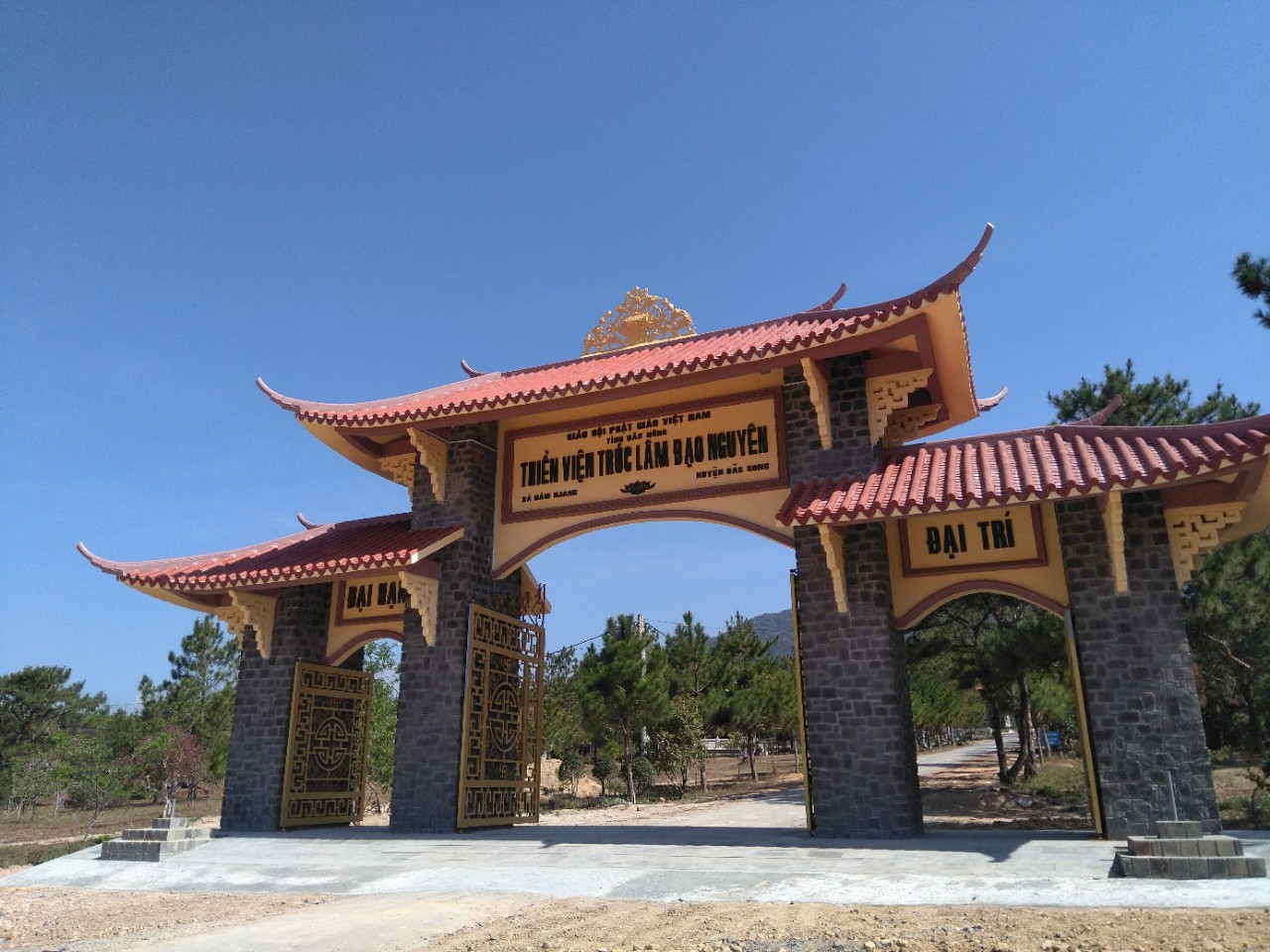
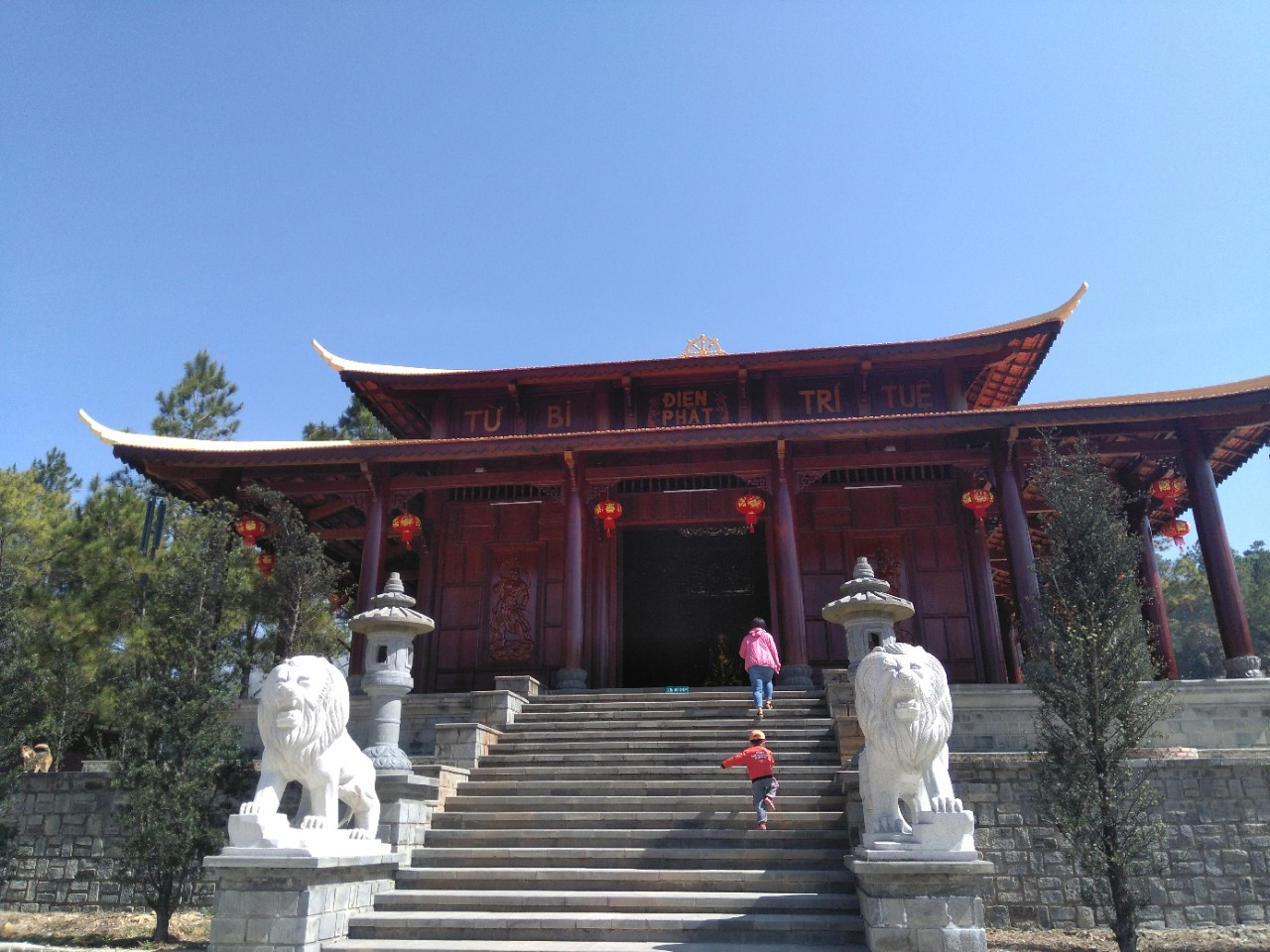
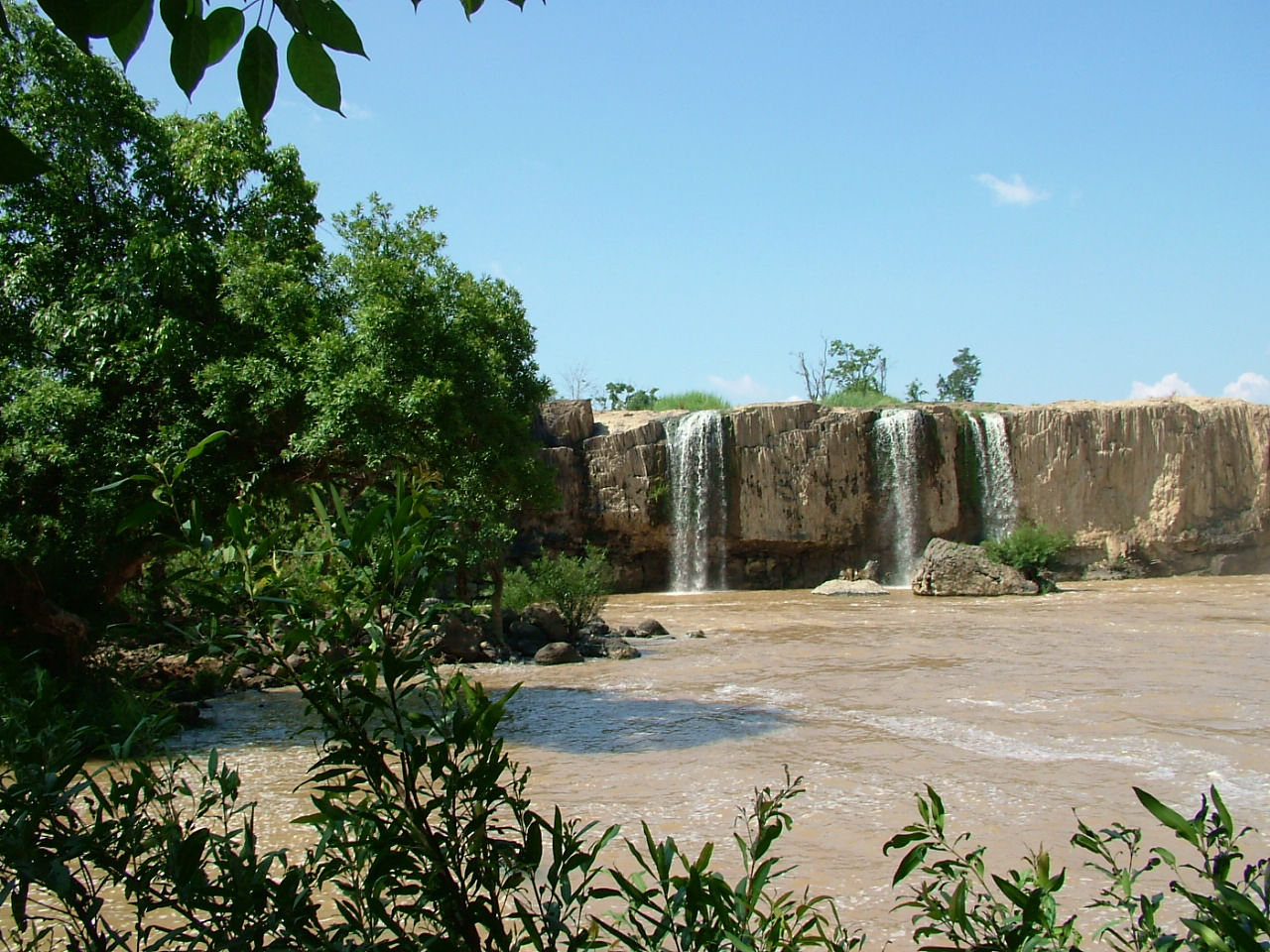
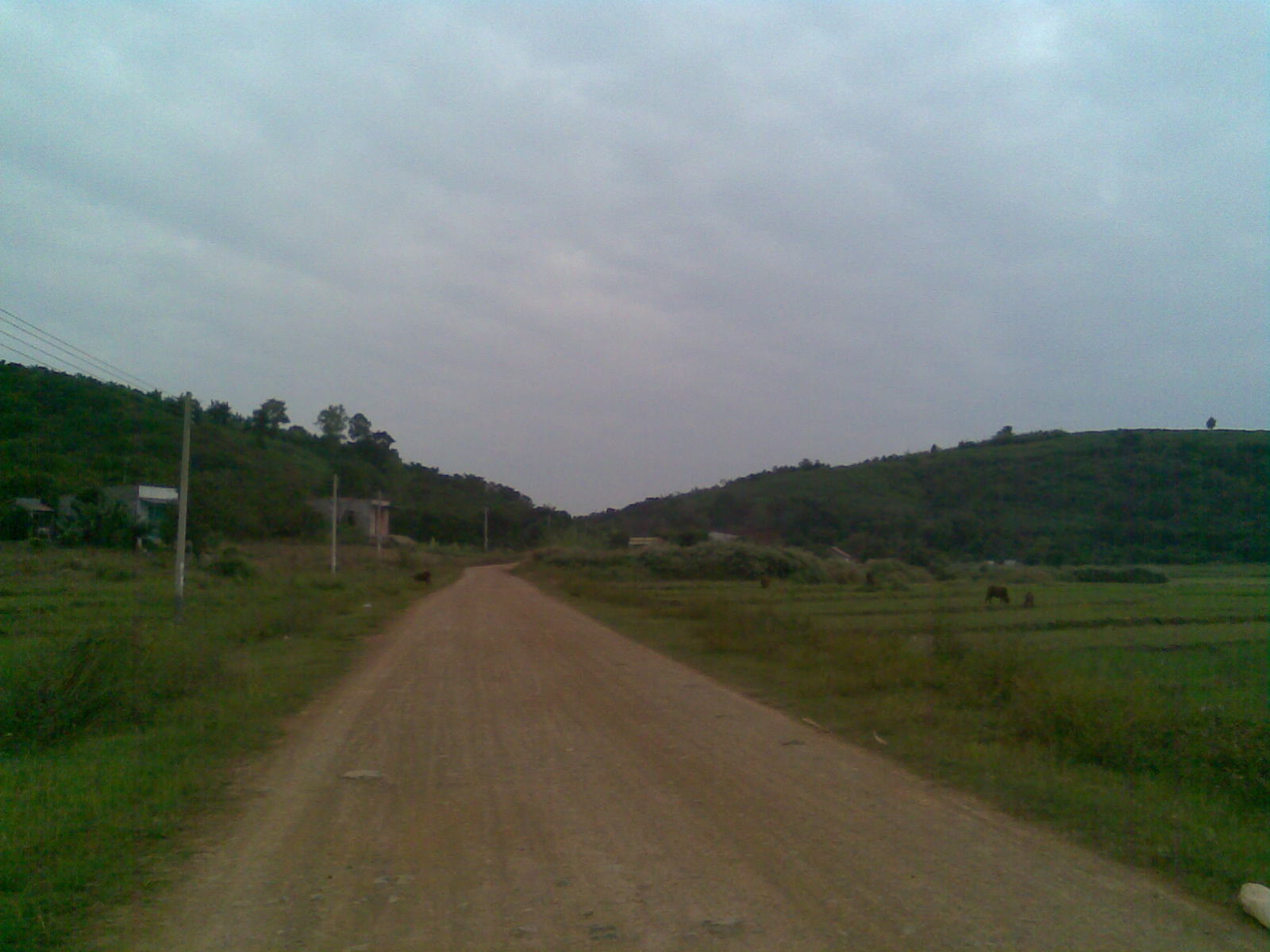
- Dray Sap Falls • Mơ Nông Plateau • Dak R'Tih River • Đạo Nguyên Temple • Nam Đông Mountain

- Seal

- Location of Đắk/Ðắc Nông within Vietnam
- Coordinates: 11°59′N 107°42′E
- Country: Vietnam
- Region: Central Highlands
- Capital: Gia Nghĩa

Area
  - Total: 6,509.27 km^{2} (2,513.24 sq mi)

Population (2025)
  - Total: 746,149
  - Density: 114.629/km^{2} (296.887/sq mi)

Demographics
  - Ethnicities: Vietnamese, Ê Đê, Nùng, M'Nông, Tày

GDP
  - Total: VND 29.227 trillion US$ 1.268 billion
- Time zone: UTC+7 (ICT)
- Area codes: 261 (from 17 June 2017); 501 (until 16 July 2017)
- ISO 3166 code: VN-72
- Website: daknong.gov.vn

Đắk Nông, anglicized as Daknong, was a former southern mountainous province in the Central Highlands region, the Central of Vietnam. It borders Đắk Lắk to the north, Lâm Đồng to the southeast, Bình Phước and Mondulkiri of Cambodia to the west. It was dissolved and merged with Lâm Đồng province on 12 June 2025.

== Name ==
Its name comes from the Đăk Nông River, an upper stream of the Đồng Nai River. Daàk-nông means "River of the Mnong" in Mnong language.

== Geography ==
Đắk Nông is about 500 m above sea level in elevation. The terrain is lower in the west. Đắk Nông has large fields and lakes in the south. Đắk Nông has three main river systems: the Ba River, the Srepok (or Sêrêpôk) river (part of the Mekong river basin) and Đồng Nai river demarking the southern border of the Province, with other small rivers and tributaries. Tà Đùng National Park helps to provide riparian zone protection for the Đồng Nai River basin.

== Climate ==
The average temperature is 24 degrees Celsius. The rainy season starts in May and ends in October. The dry season starts in November and ends in April the year after.

== Economy ==
Like Đắk Lắk province, coffee, pepper and rubber are the most important products of Đắk Nông. Đắk Nông is a potential province of tourism. There are many beautiful sites such as Ba Tang Waterfall, Diệu Thanh Waterfall, and Nâm Nung pine hill.

=== Transportation ===
In terms of air travel, the province does not have its own airport with nearest airports located in either the provinces of Đắk Lắk or Lâm Đồng provinces.

== Administrative divisions ==
Đắk Nông is subdivided into eight district-level sub-divisions:

Second Tier subdivisions	Area (km^{2})	Third Tier subdivisions		
Second Tier subdivisions	Area (km^{2})	Ward	Township	Commune
Gia Nghĩa city	286.64	5		3
Cư Jút District	718.90		1	7
Đăk Glong District				7
Đăk Mil District	682.70		1	9
Đăk R'Lấp District	63.42		1	10
Đăk Song District	808.10		1	8
Krông Nô District	816.80		1	11
Tuy Đức District	1123.27			6

They are further subdivided into five commune-level towns (or townlets), 61 communes, and five wards.

== History ==
Before 1975, Đắk Nông was part of South Vietnam (Republic of Vietnam) and was formerly named Quảng Đức Province. However, after the 1975 Việt Cộng victory and reunification with southern Vietnam in the Vietnam War, Quảng Đức was conjoined with Đắk Lắk Province.
