= Central Vietnam =

One of three geographic regions of Vietnam

Regions of Vietnam

Central Vietnam (Vietnamese: Trung Bộ or miền Trung), also known as Middle Vietnam or The Middle, formerly known as Trung Việt by the State of Vietnam, Trung Phần by the Republic of Vietnam, Trung Kỳ or Annam under French colonial rule, is one of the three geographical regions within Vietnam.

The name Trung Bộ was used by the emperor Bảo Đại when he established administrative level higher than Province in 1945, instead of the Trung Kỳ which recalled the French occupation. This name was officially used by government of the Democratic Republic of Vietnam and is popularly used today.

== Administration ==
Central Vietnam includes 3 administrative regions, which in turn comprises 19 First Tier units.

Central Vietnam
Administrative Region	First Tier Administrative Units	Area (km^{2})	Population (2022)	Population Density (people/ km^{2})	Notes
North Central Coast (Bắc Trung Bộ)	Hà Tĩnh; Nghệ An; Quảng Bình; Quảng Trị; Thanh Hóa; Huế^{†}	51,242.75	11,190,830	218.39	contains the coastal provinces in the northern half of Vietnam's narrow central part. They all stretch from the coast in the east to Laos in the west.
South Central Coast (Duyên hải Nam Trung Bộ)	Bình Định; Bình Thuận; Đà Nẵng ^{†} Khánh Hòa; Ninh Thuận; Phú Yên; Quảng Nam; Quảng Ngãi	44,605.12	9,470,840	212.33	contains the coastal provinces in the southern half of Vietnam's central part. One province borders Laos.
Central Highlands (Tây Nguyên)	Đắc Lắc; Đắk Nông; Gia Lai; Kon Tum; Lâm Đồng	54,548.31	6,092,420	111.69	contains the mountainous provinces to the west of south-central Vietnam. There are a significant number of ethnic minorities in the region. One province is along Vietnam's border with Laos, and four border Cambodia (Kon Tum borders both Laos and Cambodia).

^† Municipality (thành phố trực thuộc trung ương)

Of all 19 First Tier units, 2 are municipalities and 17 are provinces.

== Gallery ==
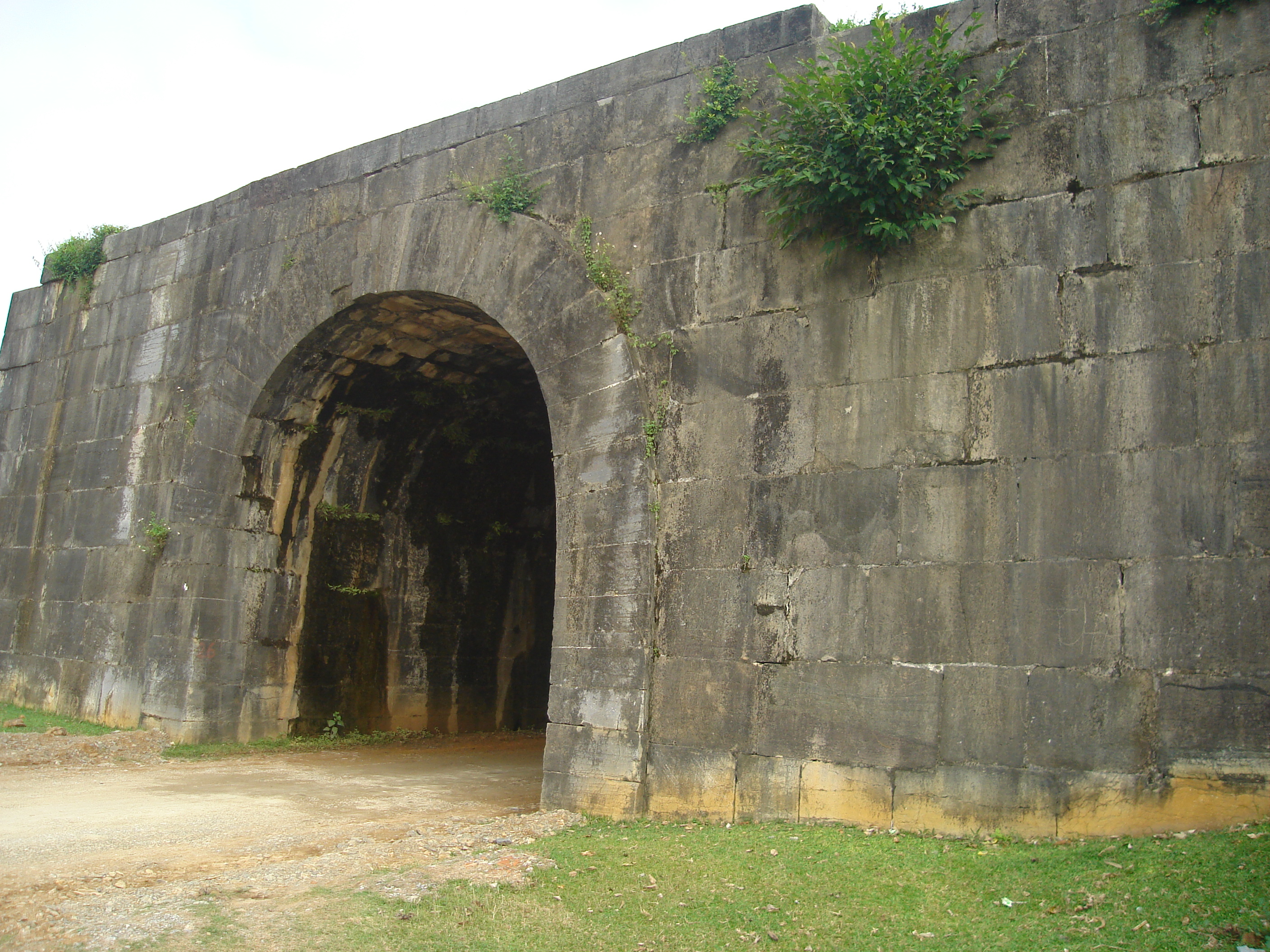
Hồ Dynasty citadel
Thanh Hoá

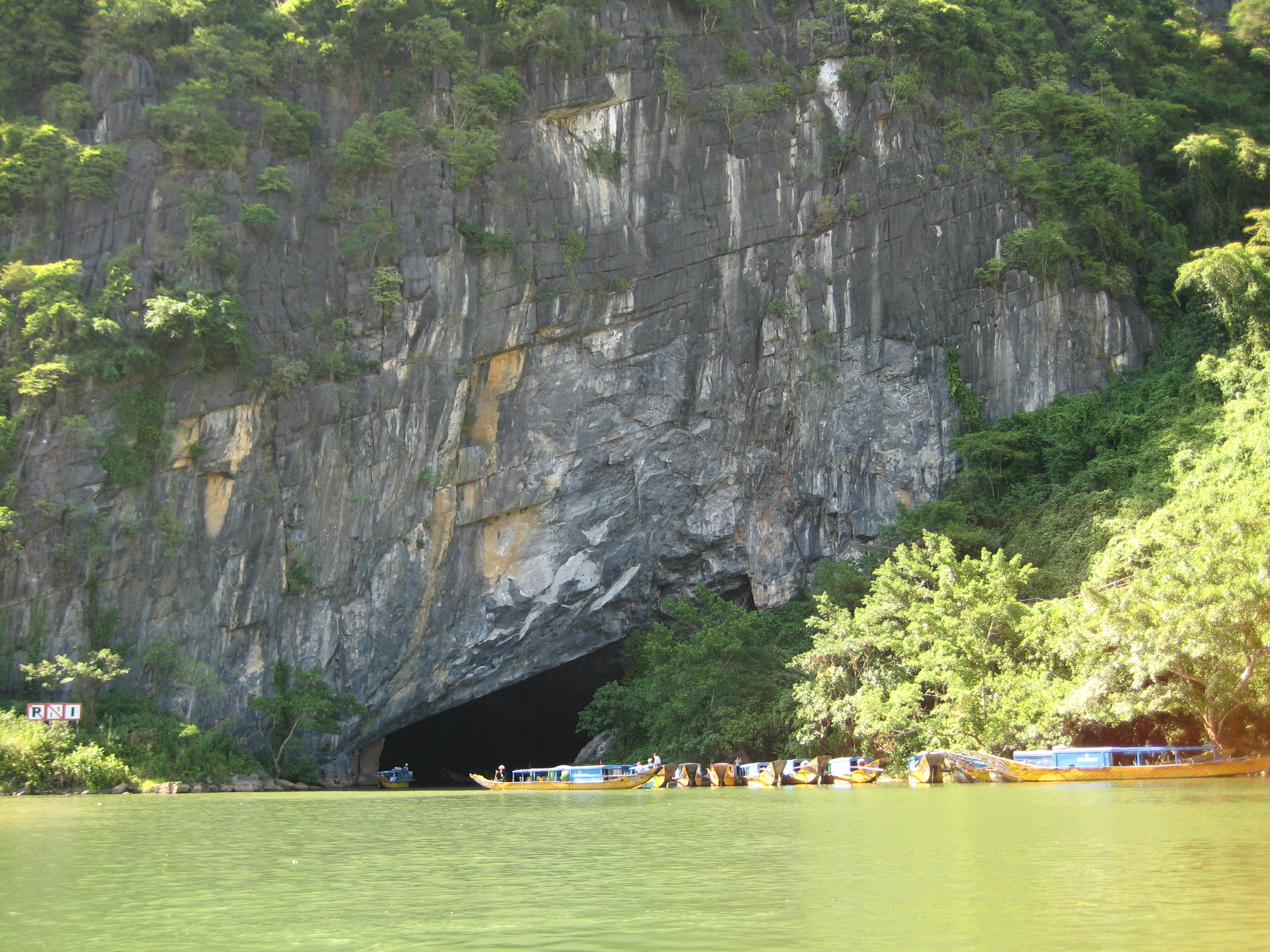
Phong Nha - Kẻ Bàng
Quảng Bình

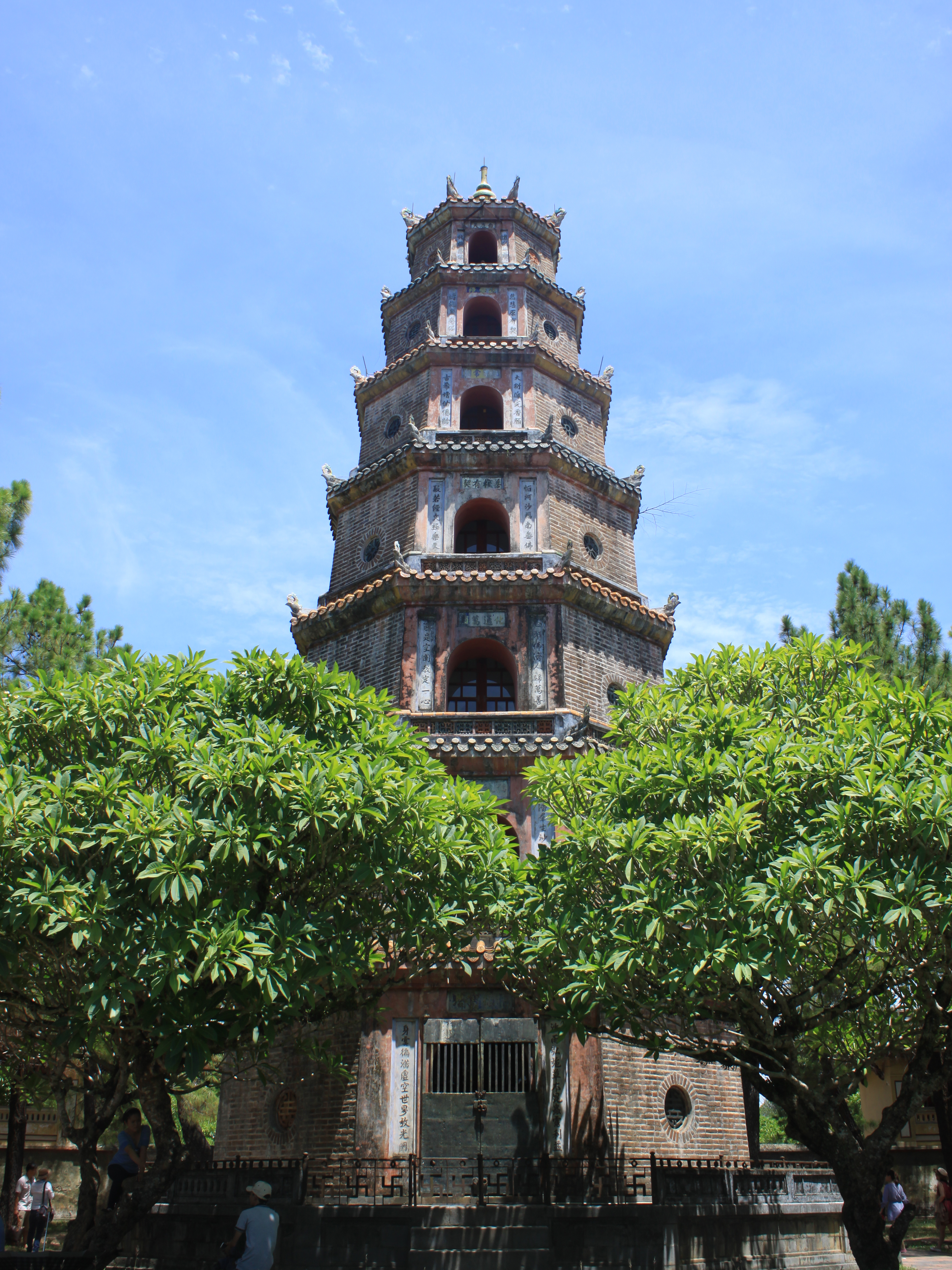
Thiên Mụ Pagoda
Huế

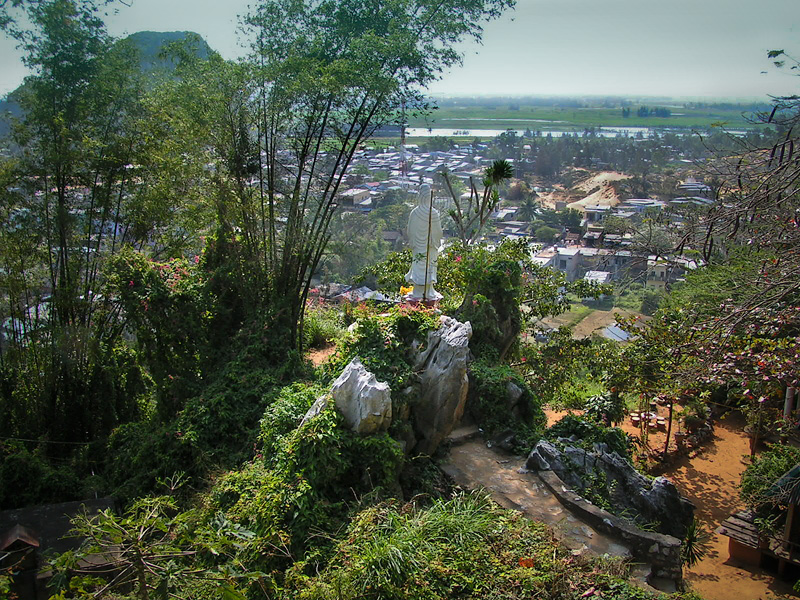
Marble Mountains
Da Nang

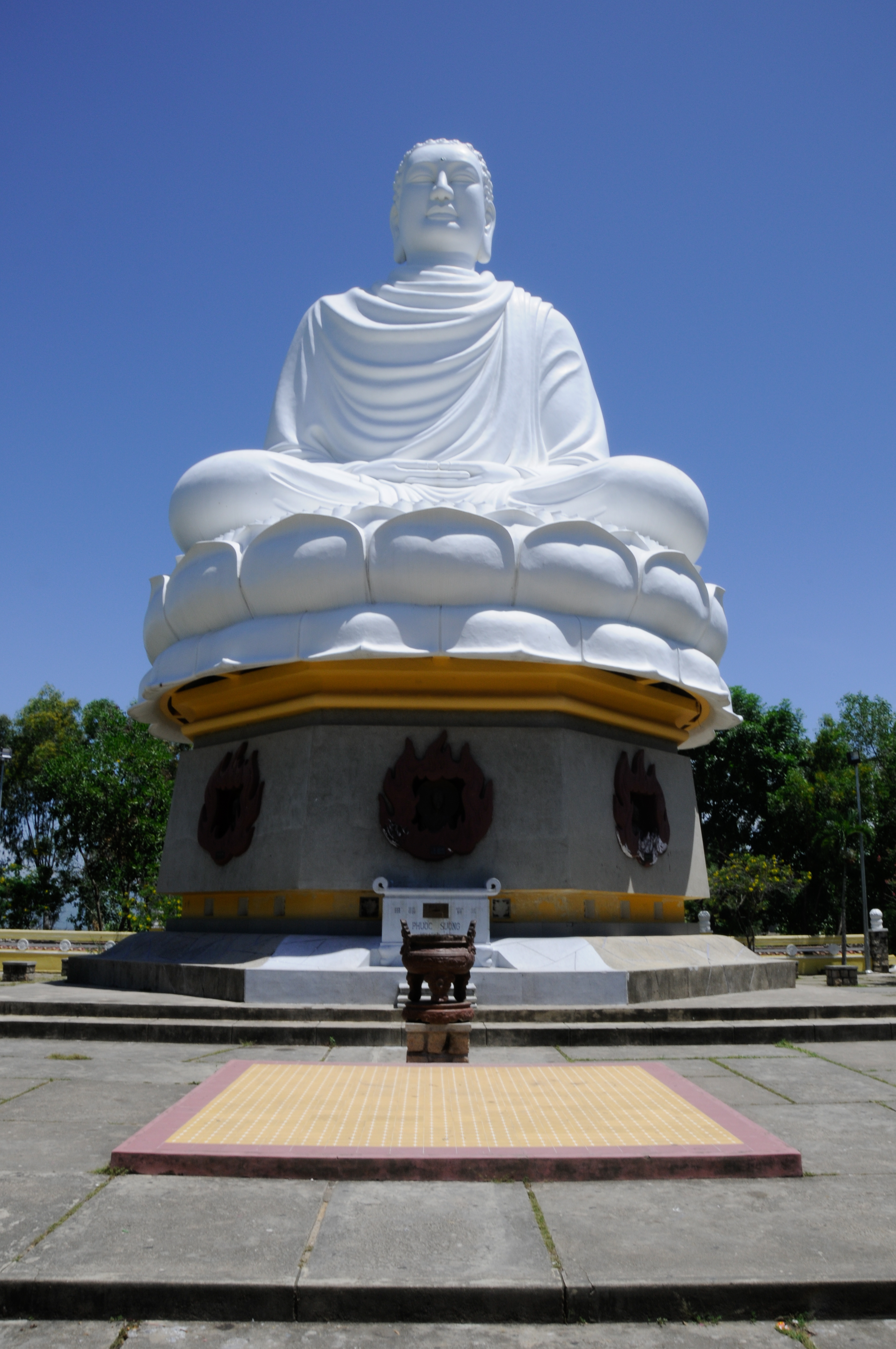
Sitting Buddha statue
Long Sơn Pagoda
Nha Trang

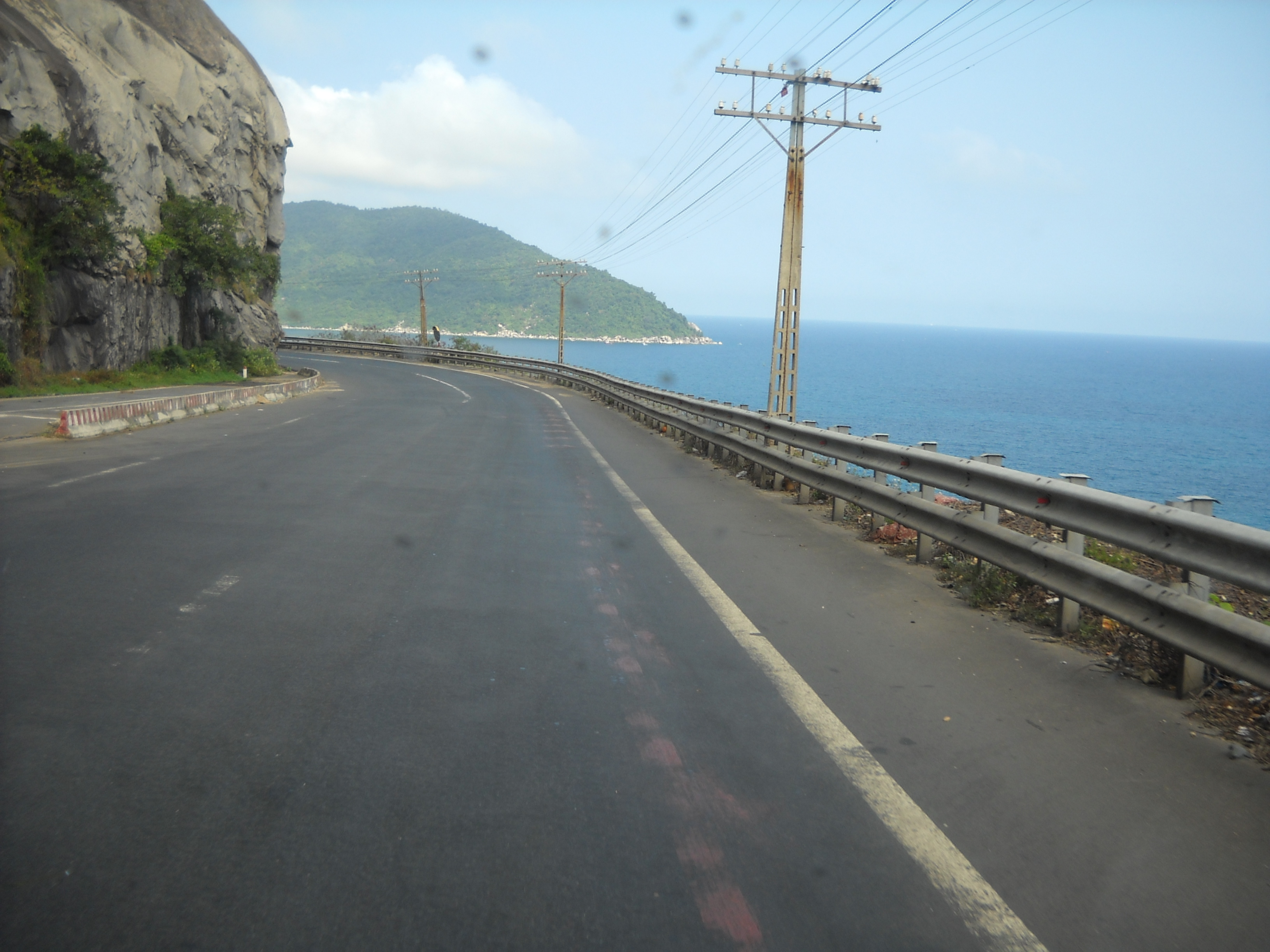
Đèo Pass
Đại Lãnh, Khánh Hòa

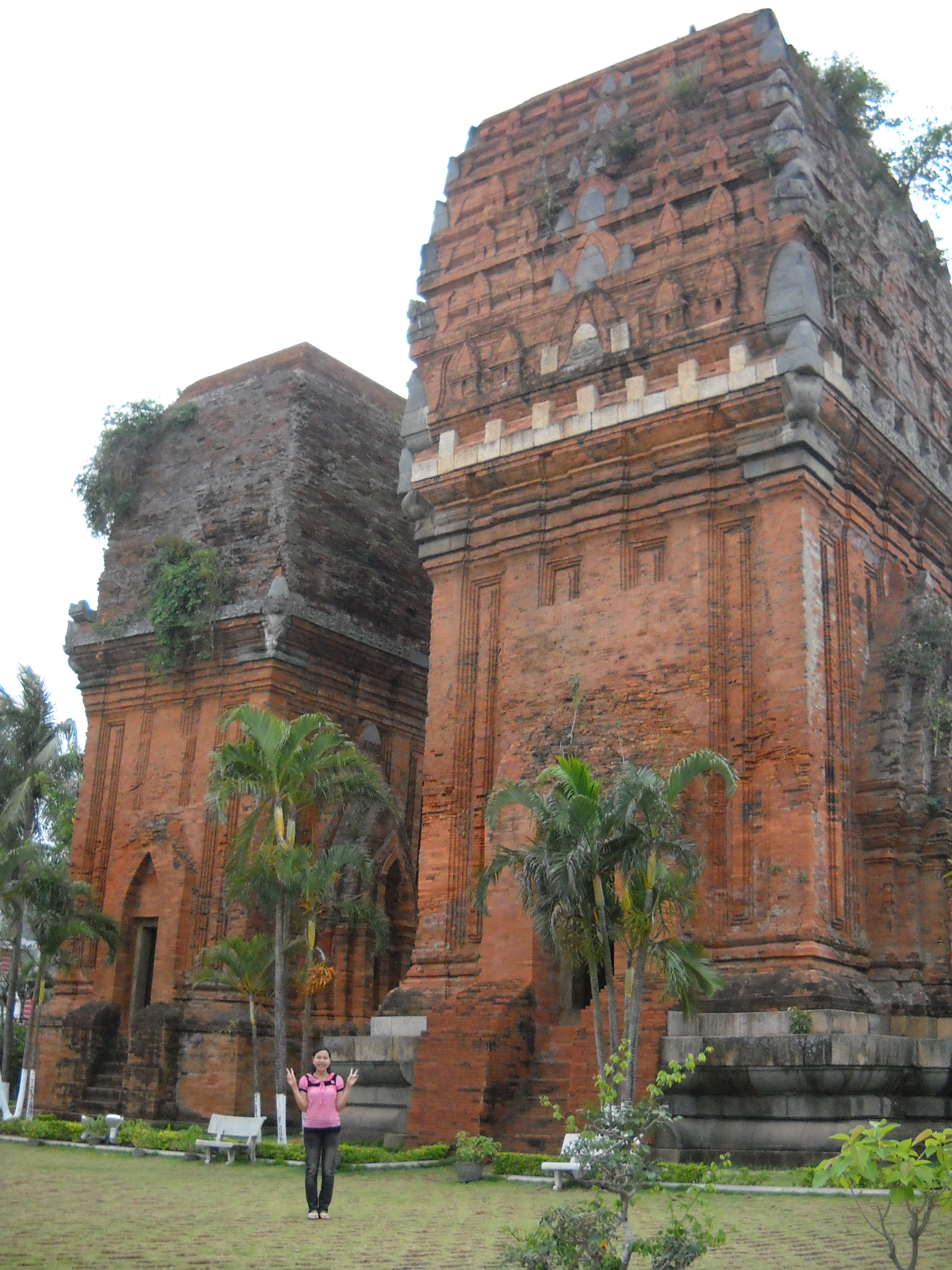
Twin Tower
Quy Nhơn, Bình Định

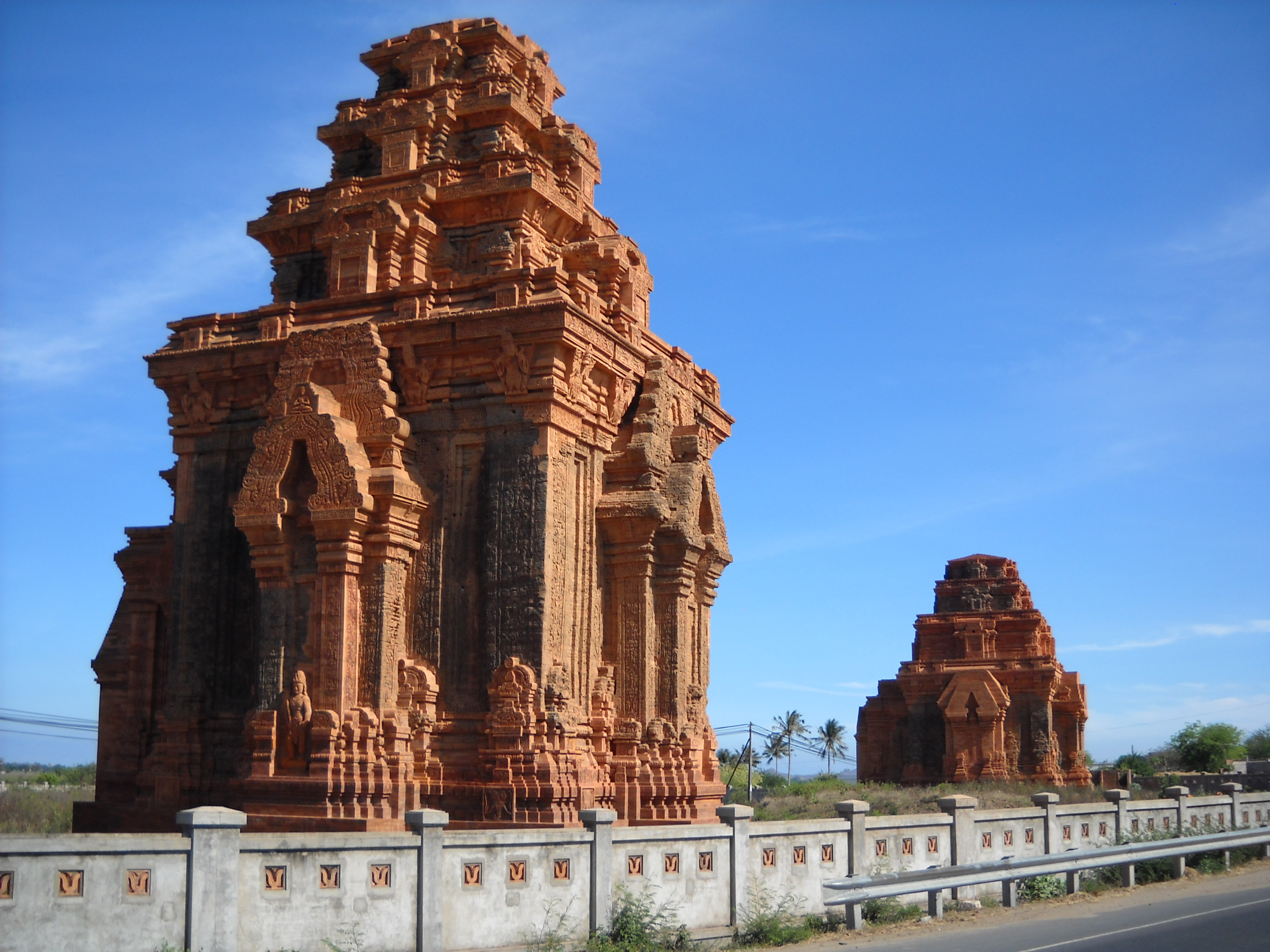
Hòa Lai Tower
Ninh Thuận

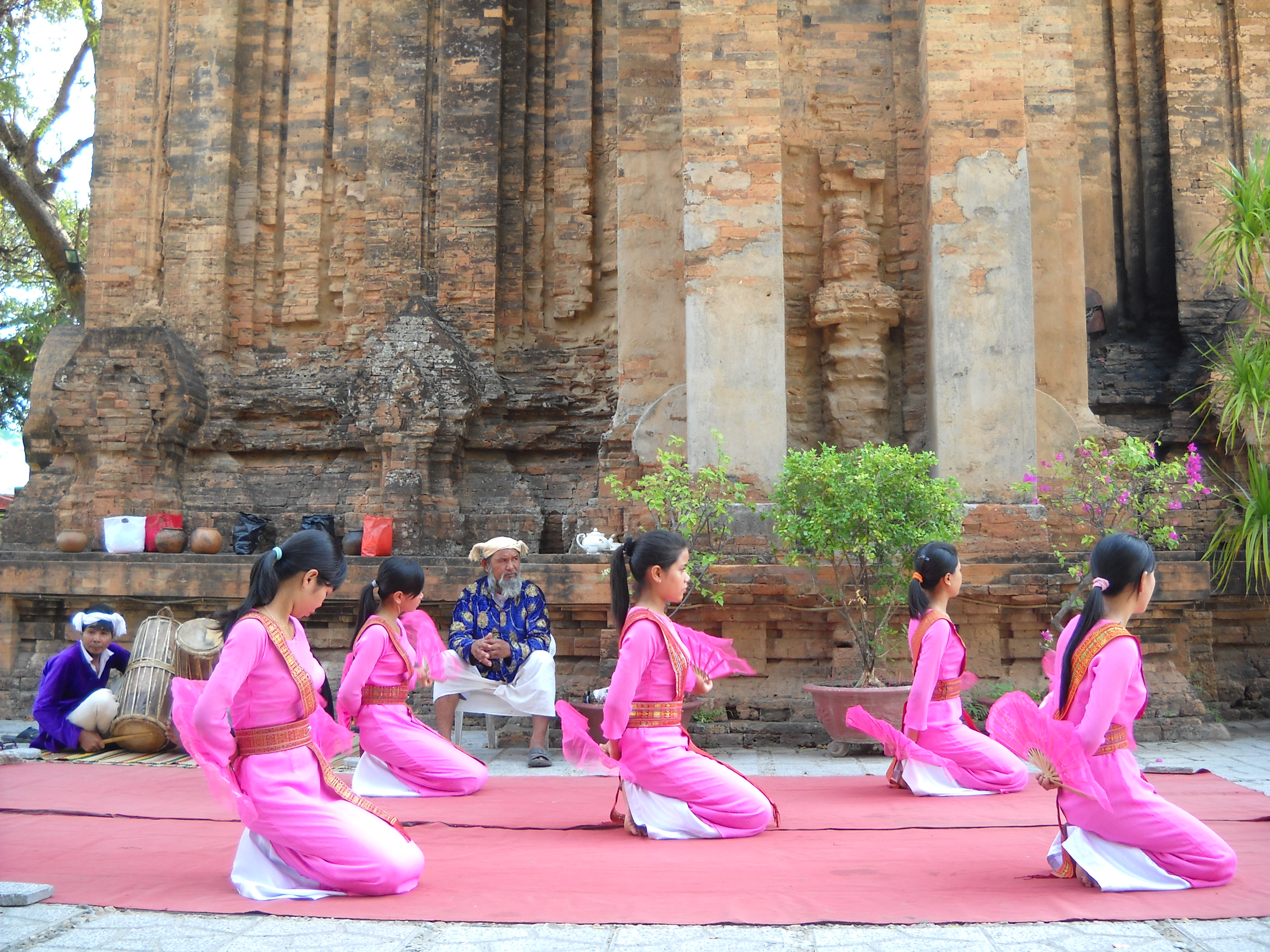
Chams girls
Phan Rang

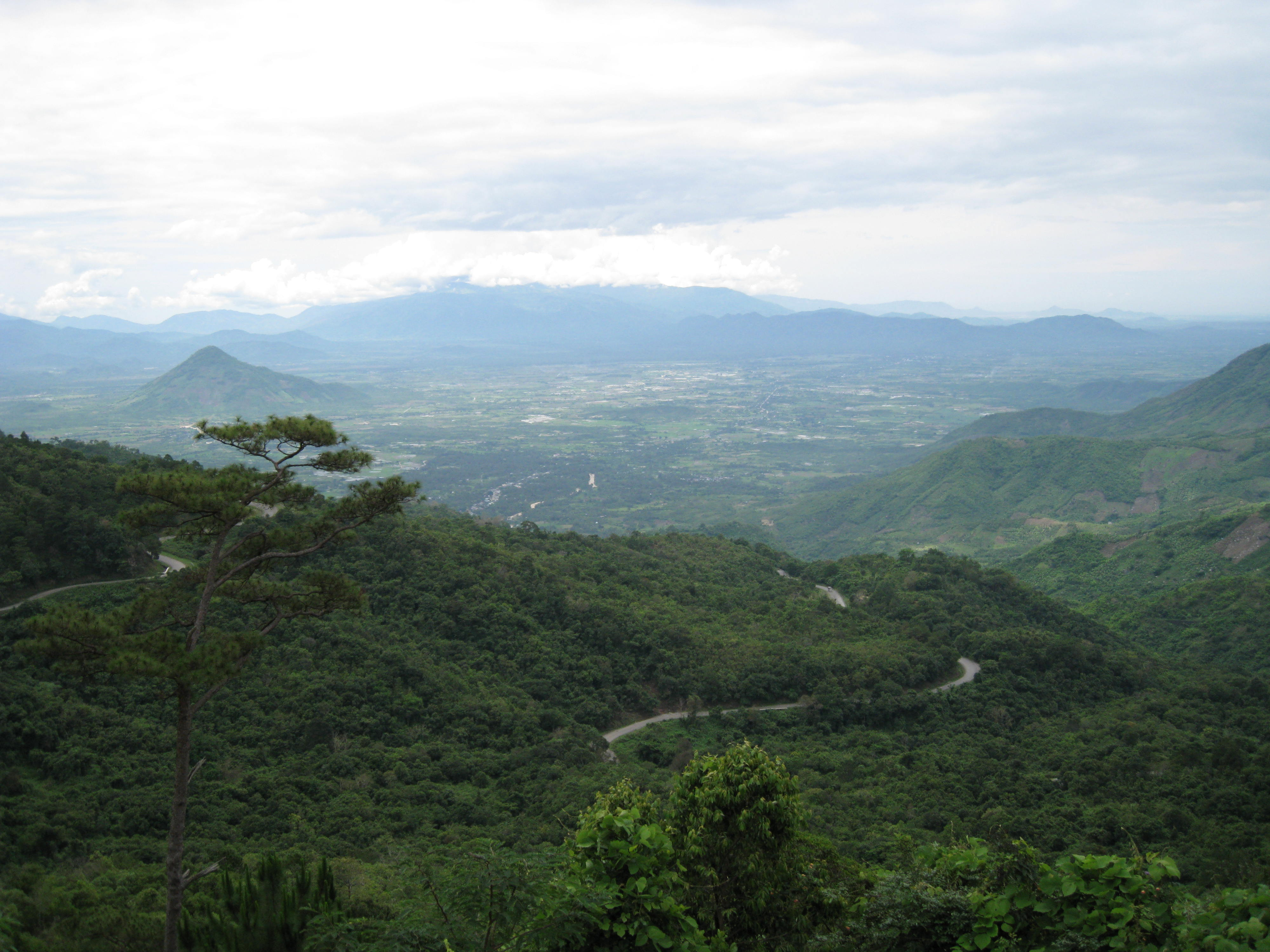
Ngoạn Mục Pass

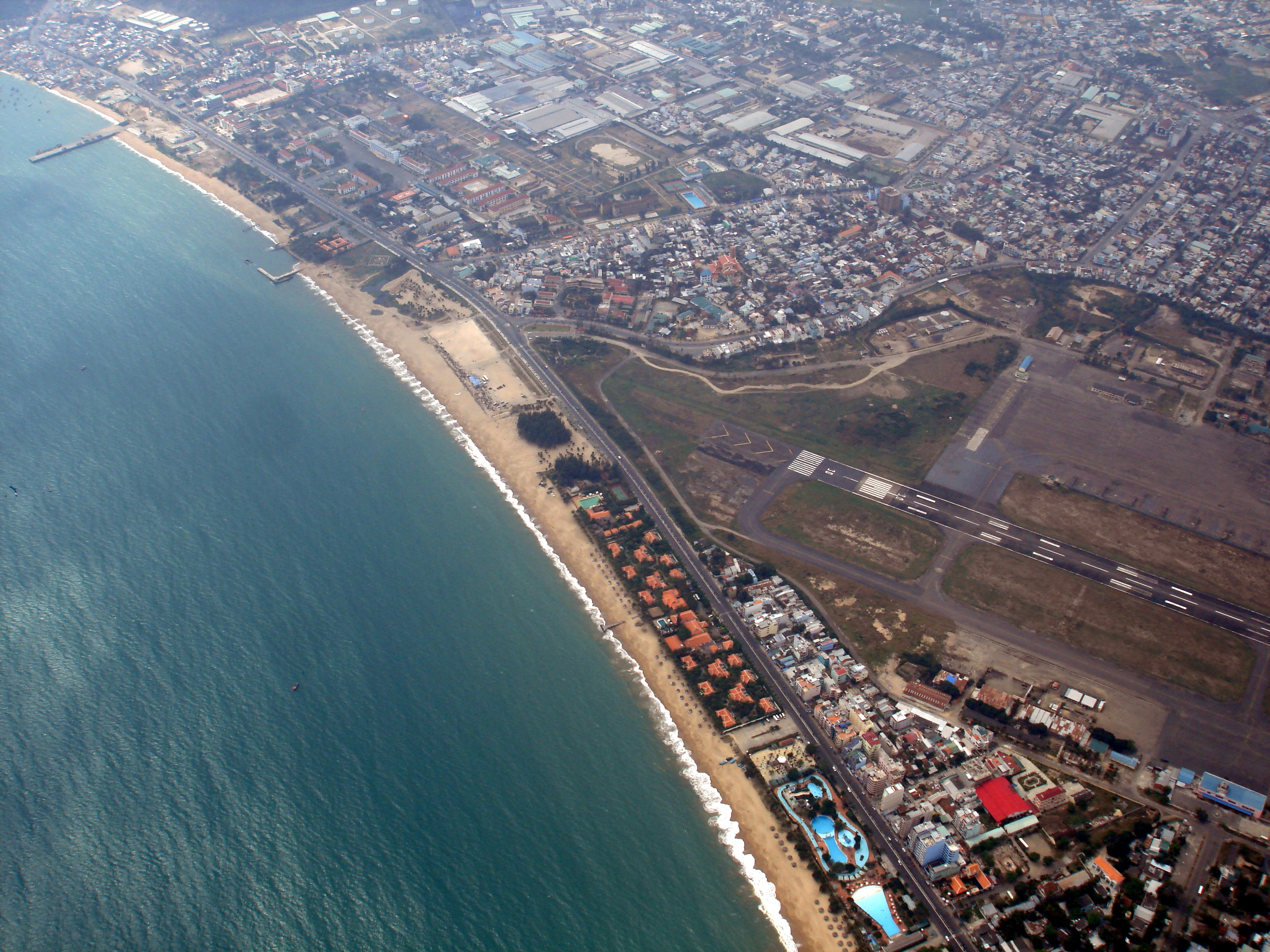
Nha Trang City

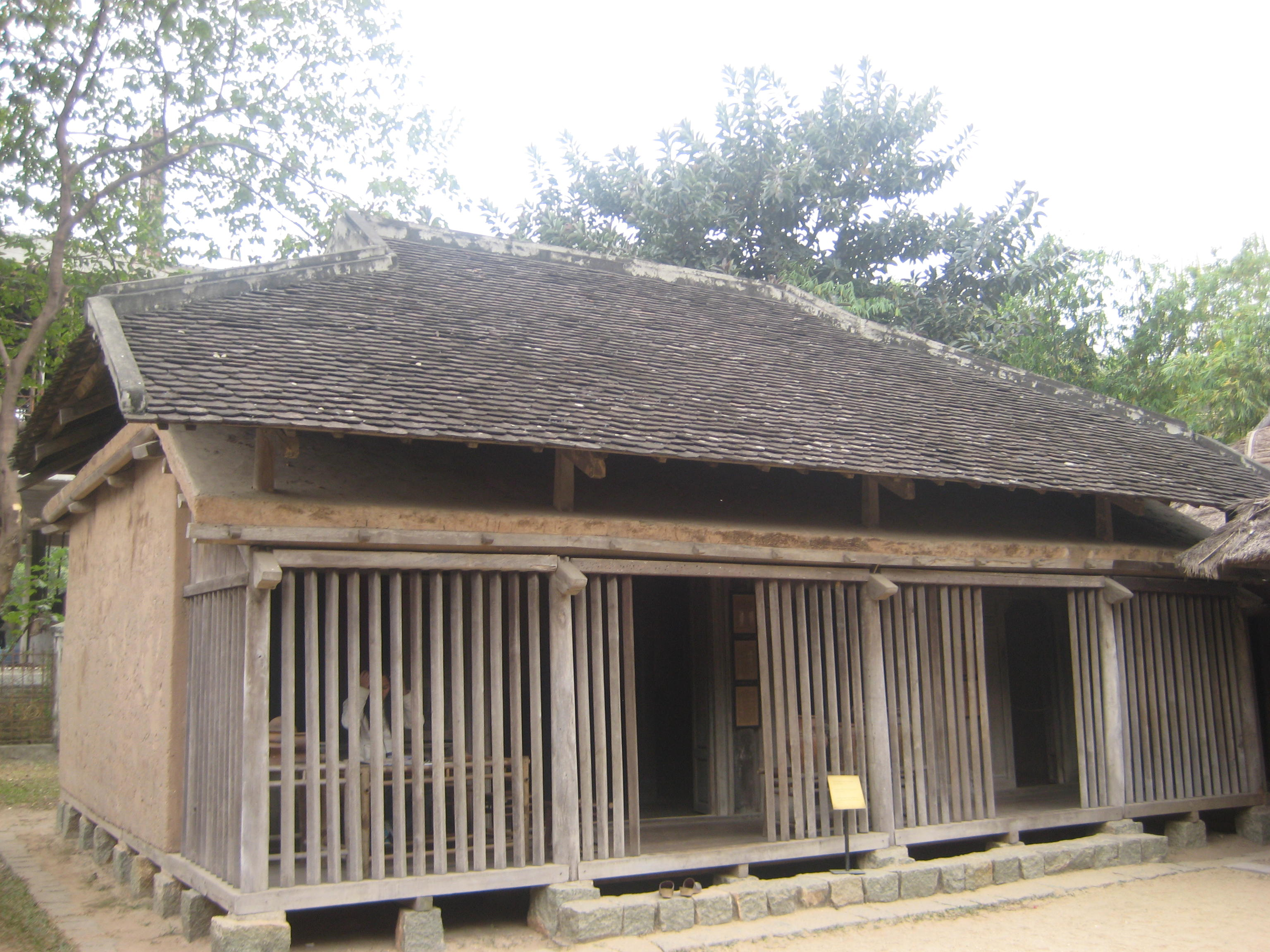
Chams house

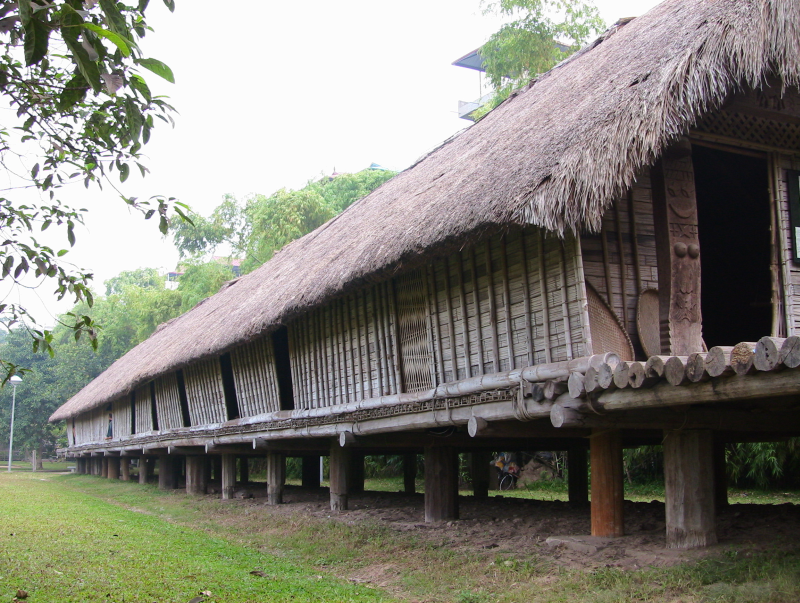
Ede long house

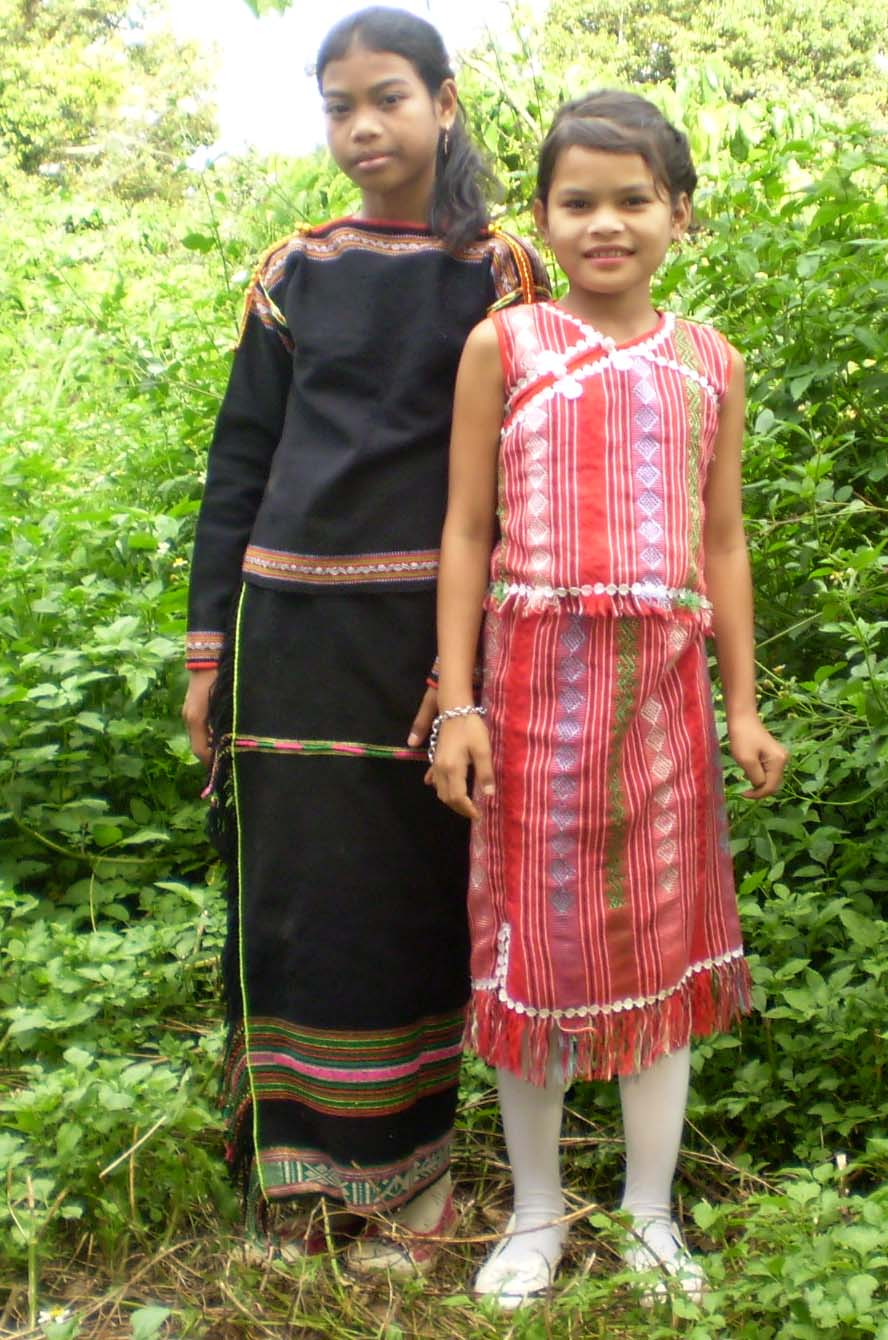
Ede children

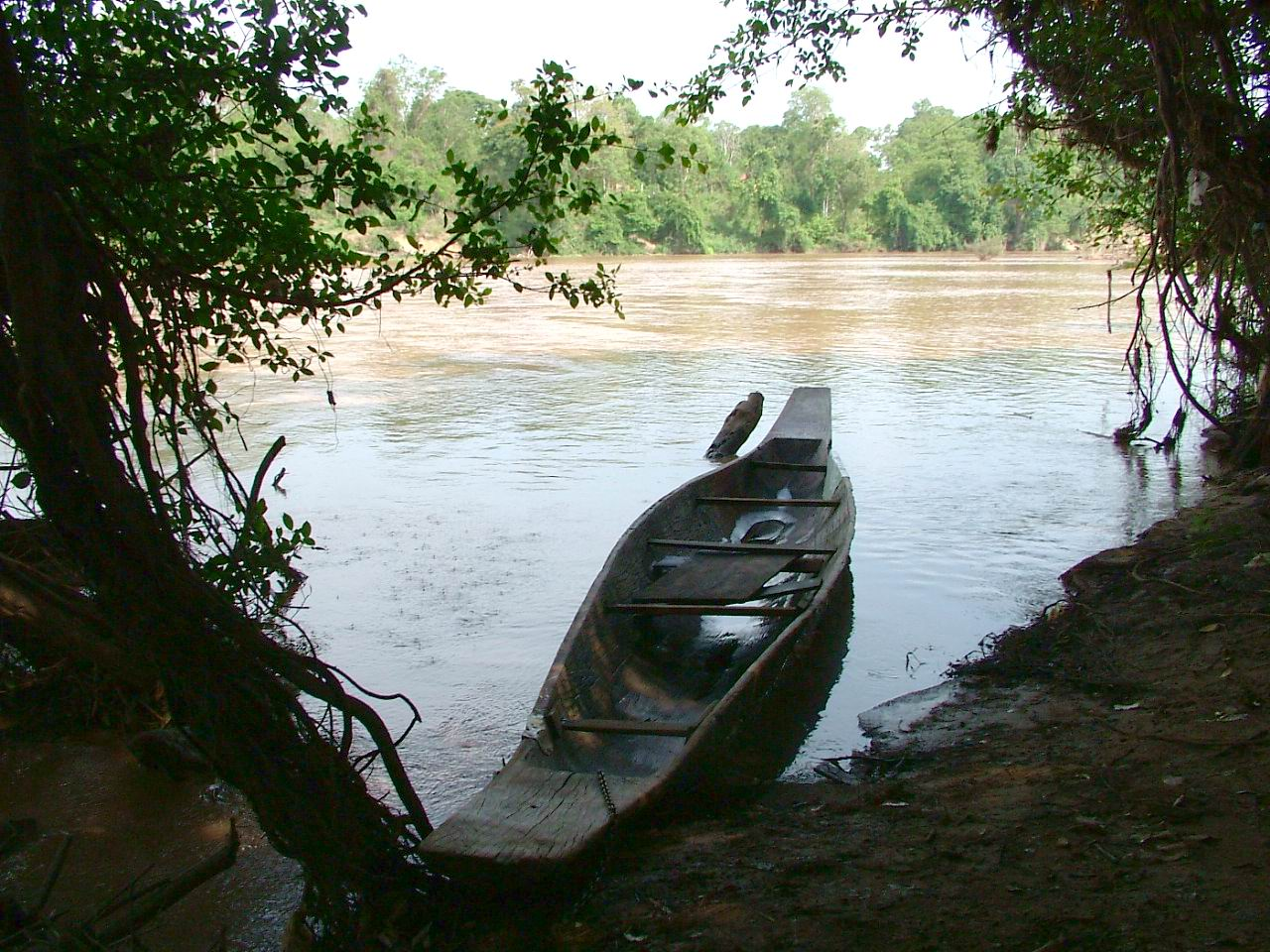
Dugout boat
of the Ede people

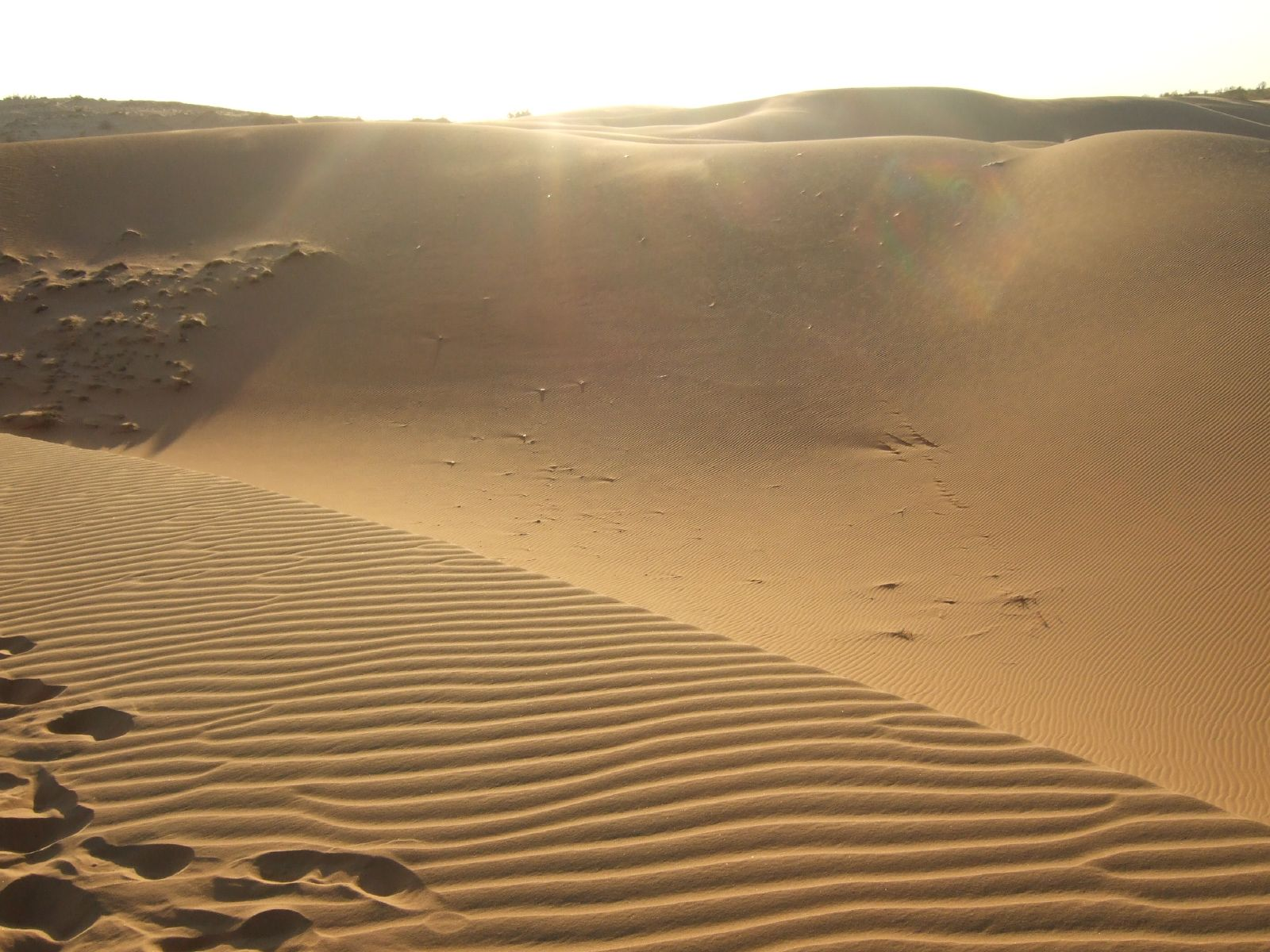
Mũi Né Sand Dunes

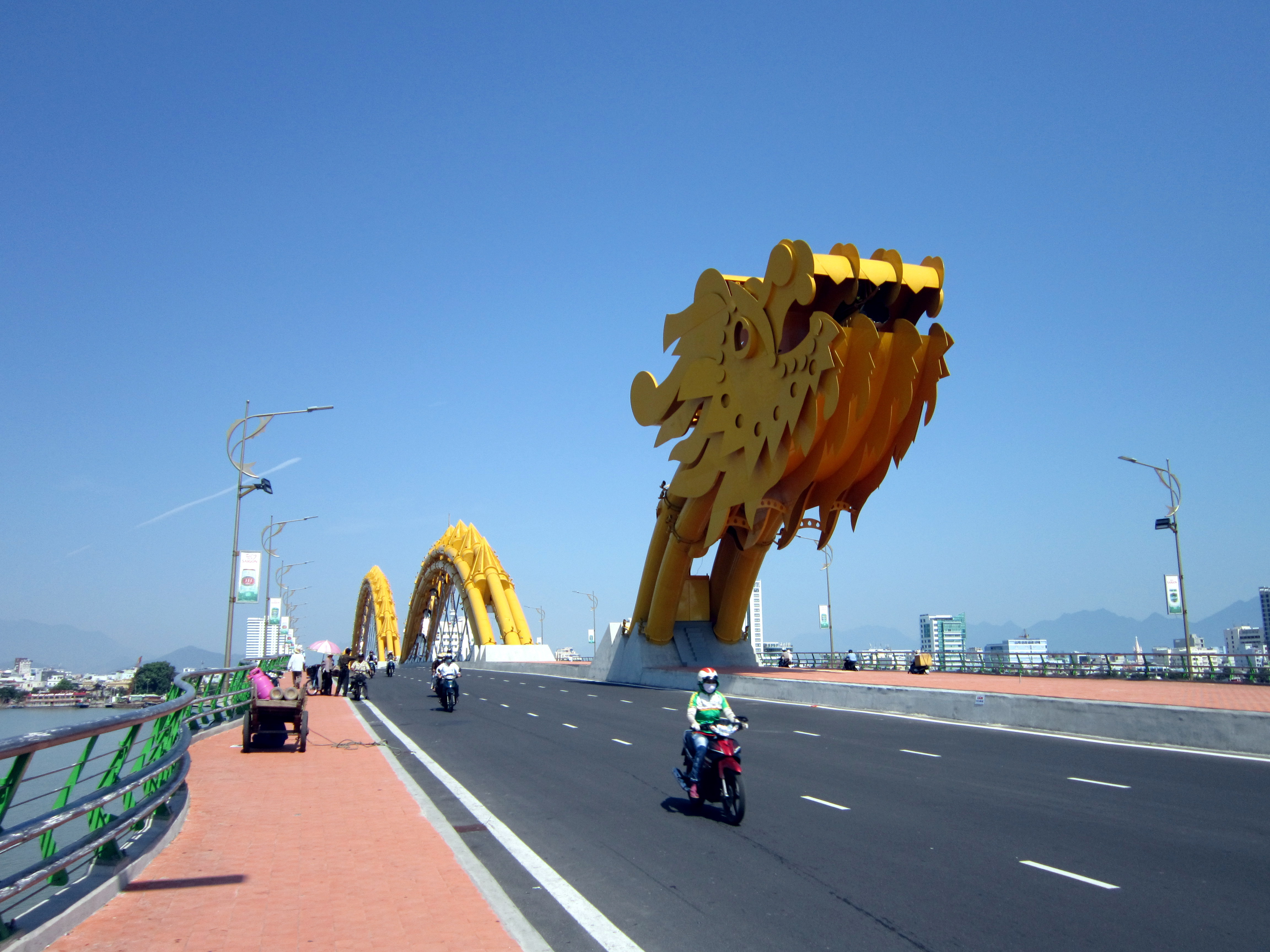
Rông Bridge - Đà Nẵng City

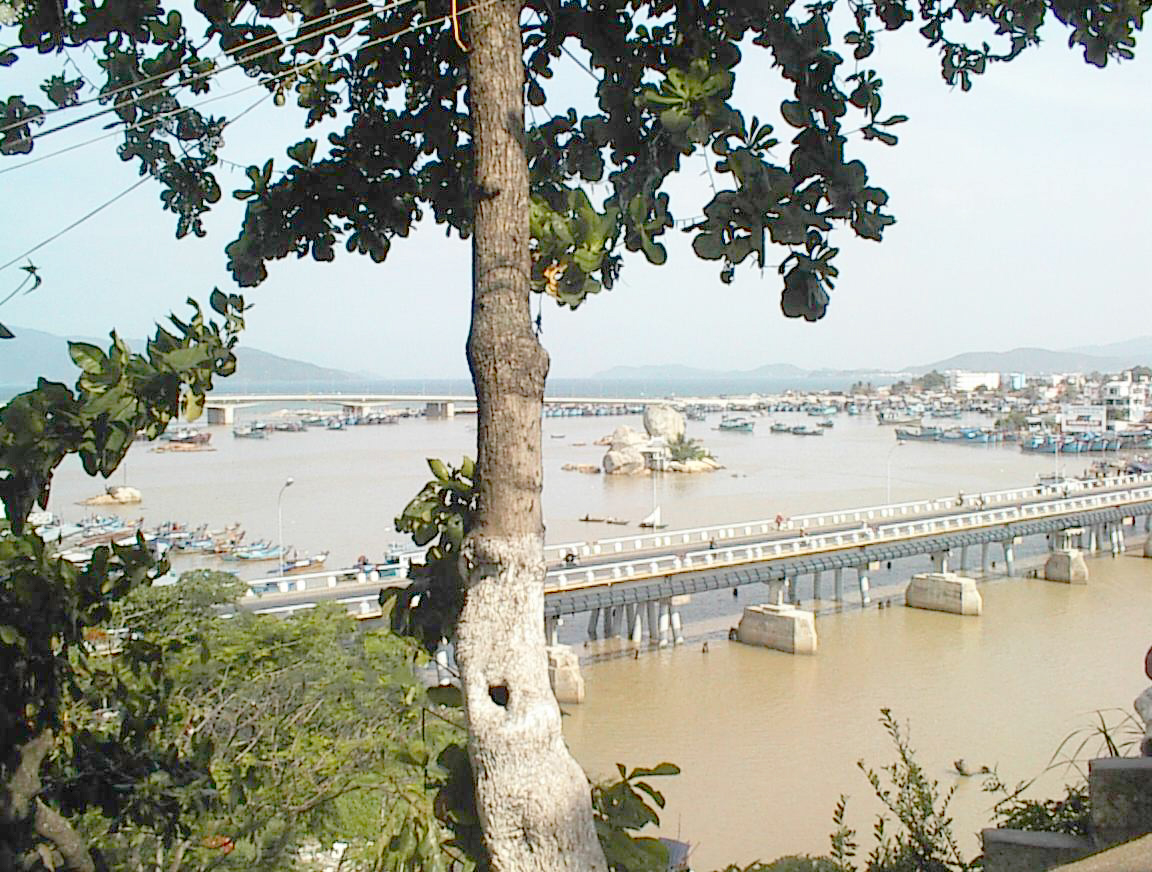
Trần Phú Bridge, Nha Trang

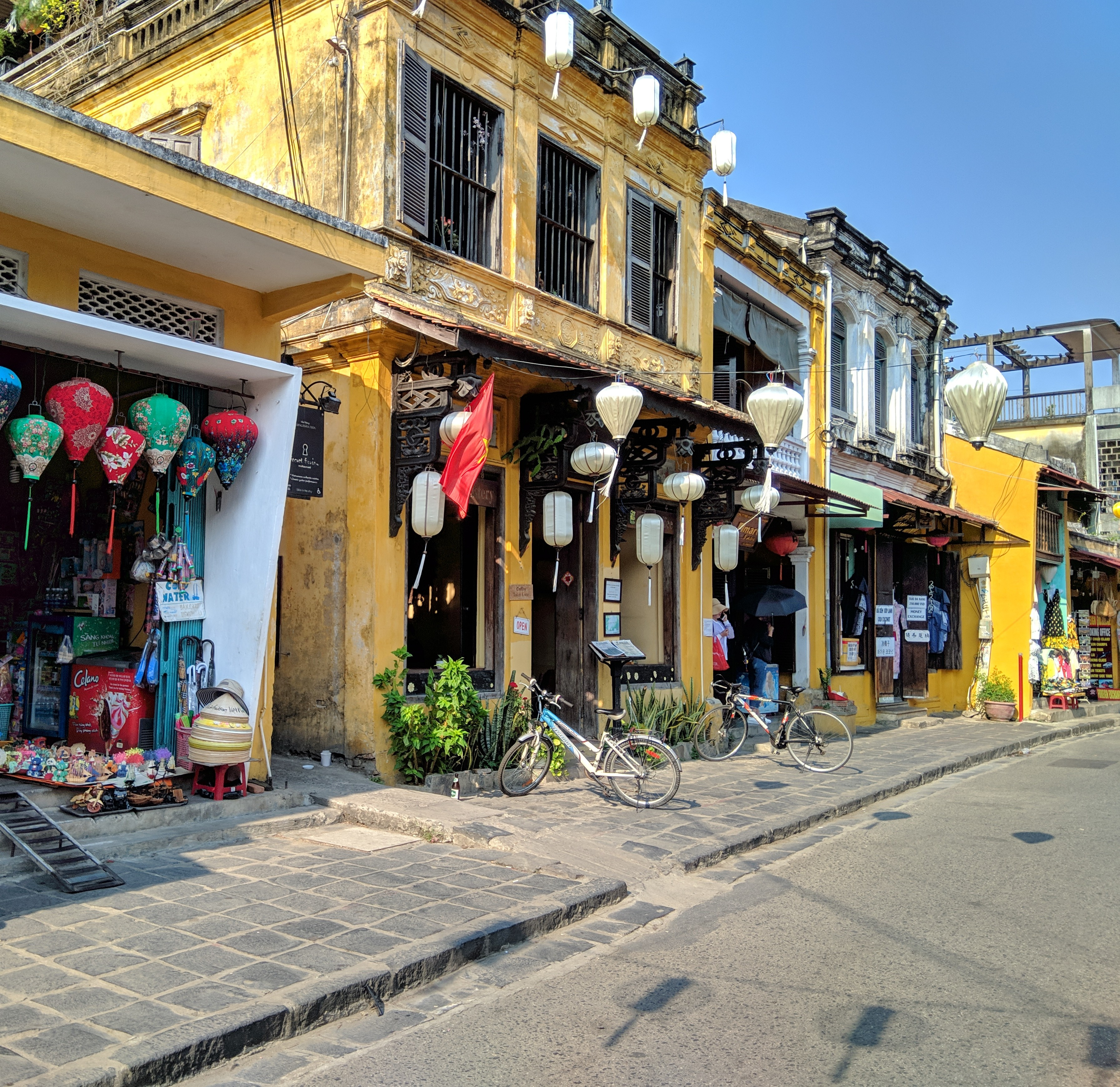
Hội An - Quang Nam

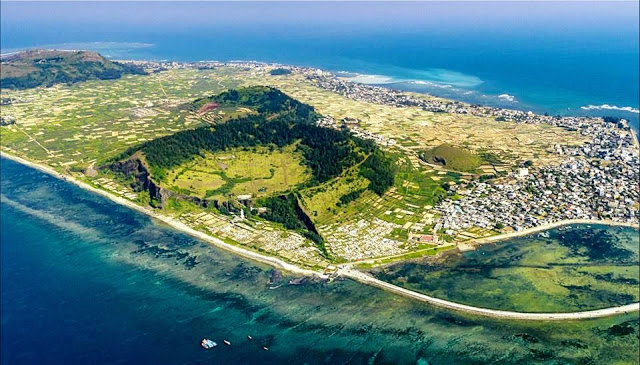
Lý Sơn

== See also ==
- Northern, Central and Southern Vietnam
- Regions of Vietnam
