= Rade language =

Austronesian language spoken in Vietnam

Rade
- Klei Êđê
- Native to: Vietnam
- Ethnicity: Rade
- Native speakers: 180,000 in Vietnam (2007)
- Language family: Austronesian: Malayo-Polynesian; Malayo-Sumbawan (?); Chamic; Highlands; Rade
- Writing system: Latin

Language codes
- ISO 639-3: Either: rad – Rade ibh – Bih
- Glottolog: rade1240 Rade biha1246 Bih
- ELP: Bih

Rade (Rhade; Rade: klei Êđê; Vietnamese: tiếng Ê-đê or tiếng Ê Đê) is an Austronesian language spoken by in South Central Vietnam, particularly the Central Highlands. It is the native language of the Rade people, who inhabit the area along with parts of Cambodia. It is a member of the Chamic subgroup, and is closely related to the Cham language of central Vietnam.

== Classification ==
Đoàn Văn Phúc (1998:23) provides the following classification for the Rade dialects. Đoàn (1998) also provides a 1,000-word vocabulary list for all of the nine Rade dialects.

- Area 1
  - Area 1.1: Krung, Kpă, Adham
  - Area 1.2: Drao. Êpan, Ktul
  - Blô (mixture of areas 1.1 and 1.2, as well as Mdhur)
- Area 2
  - Mdhur
  - Bih

Đoàn Văn Phúc (1998:23) assigns the following cognacy percentages for comparisons between Kpă and the other eight dialects of Rade, with Bih as the most divergent dialect.

- Kpă – Krung: 85.5%
- Kpă – Adham: 82%
- Kpă – Ktul: 82%
- Kpă – Mdhur: 80%
- Kpă – Blô: 82%
- Kpă – Êpan: 85%
- Kpă – Drao: 81%
- Kpă – Bih: 73%

== Dialects ==
Đoàn Văn Phúc (1998:24) lists nine dialects of Rade. They are spoken mostly in Đắk Lắk Province in the Central Highlands region of Vietnam.

- Kpă: spoken throughout Buôn Ma Thuột
- Krung: spoken in Ea H'leo and Krông Năng; some Krung also live among the Jarai in Gia Lai Province
- Adham: spoken in Krông Buk, Krông Năng, and Ea H'leo
- Ktul: spoken in Krông Bông and the southern part of Krông Pắk
- Drao (Kơdrao): spoken in M'Đrăk (in the townships of Krông Jing, Cư M'Ta, and Ea Trang)
- Blô: spoken in M'Đrăk (small population)
- Êpan: spoken in M'Đrăk (small population)
- Mdhur: spoken in Ea Kar and M'Đrăk; also in Gia Lai Province and Phu Yen Province
- Bih: spoken in Krông Ana and in the southern part of Buôn Ma Thuột

Bih, which has about 1,000 speakers, may be a separate language. Tam Nguyen (2015) reported that there are only 10 speakers of Bih out of an ethnic population of about 400 people.

A patrilineal Rade subgroup known as the Hmok or Hmok Pai is found in the Buôn Ma Thuột area (Phạm 2005:212).

== Phonology ==
The spelling is shown in italics.

=== Consonants ===
Rade consonants
		Labial	Alveolar	Palatal	Velar	Glottal
Nasal		m /m/	n /n/	ñ /ɲ/	ng /ŋ/	
Stop	voiceless	p /p/	t /t/	č /c/	k /k/	/ʔ/
Stop	aspirated	ph /pʰ/	th /tʰ/	čh /cʰ/	kh /kʰ/	
Stop	voiced	b /b/	d /d/	j /ɟ/	g /ɡ/	
Stop	implosive	ƀ /ɓ/	đ /ɗ/	dj /ʄ/		
Fricative			s /s/			h /h/
Approximant		w /w/	l /l/	y /j/		
Rhotic			r /r/			

- The voiced implosives /ɓ, d, ʄ/ are also described as "preglottalized stops" ([ˀb, ˀd, ˀɟ]. (Note: The author used the term "tiền thanh hầu hóa," which literally translates to "preglottalization." However, he also used "tiền tắc họng hóa," with the IPA glottalization symbol [ˀ] in reference to the allophonic realizations of the plain stops /b, d, ɟ/. The phonetic description of /ɓ, d, ʄ/ includes a lowering of the glottis ("hạ thấp thanh hầu") prior to a stop closure, which is consistent with implosives. The author also listed a velar implosive transcribed with the letter g with a crossbar.)
- According to Đoàn (1993):
  - /ɟ/ is as an affricate [d̠͡ʝ]. (Note: The author acknowledged the phonetic realization as an affricate ("tắc-xát"), but still treated it as a single phonological stop ("tắc").)
  - /t, tʰ/ are dental ([t̪, t̪ʰ]).
  - /j/ has slight friction ([j̝]).
  - There is an optional schwa between the bilabial plosives /p, b, ɓ/ and /l, r, h/. Thus pra "scaffold" is pronounced [pᵊrä].
  - /m/ is weakened before most consonants, except before the liquids /l, r/ where there may be a schwa. Compare mčah "broken" [ᵐcäh] and mla "tusk" [mᵊlä].
- When other consonants is followed by /l, r, h/, there may be a schwa or coarticulation. Compare trah "to fish" [tᵊräh], tlao "to laugh" [tläu̯~t͜läu̯], dlao "to scold" [dläu̯~d͜läu̯], dhan "branch" [dhän~dʱän], jhat "bad" [ˀɟhät̚~ˀɟʱät̚], ghang "to roast" [ɡhäŋ~ɡʱäŋ].
- /w/ can also be heard as a more bilabial [β̞].
- Glottalized final consonant sounds /wʔ, jʔ, jh/ are heard only in final position.

=== Vowels ===
Rade vowels
	Front		Central		Back	
	short	long	short	long	short	long
High	ĭ /i/	i /iː/	ư̆ /ɨ/	ư /ɨː/	ŭ /u/	u /uː/
Mid	ê̆ /e/	ê /eː/	ơ̆ /ə/	ơ /əː/	ô̆ /o/	ô /oː/
Low	ĕ /ɛ/	e /ɛː/	ă /a/	a /aː/	ŏ /ɔ/	o /ɔː/

- /aː, a/ are central (respectively [ä, ɐ̆]).

== Vocabulary ==
- Khoa sang – the most senior in age and authority
- Dega – Protestant of Christian (single word identity of E-de)
- Ih – you
- Ung – husband
- Ñu – her/him
- Diñu – they
- Drei – we
- Khăp – love
- Bi êmut – hate
- idai – younger sibling
- amĭ – mom/mother
- yah – grandma/grandmother
- aê – grandma/grandfather
- Ama – father, dad daddy
- Jhat – ugly, bad
- Siam – pretty
- Siam mniê – beautiful girl
- Jăk – good
- Khăp – love
- Brei – give
- Djŏ – true
- Nao – go
- Kâo – I/me
- anăn – name
- Čar – country
- Čiăng – want/like
- Aê Diê – God
- Blŭ – speak
- Klei blŭ – language
- Bur – rice porridge
- Êmŏng – fat
- Êwang – skinny
- Jŭ – black
- Hriê/hrê – to be from
- Mơ̆ng – from
- Sa, dua, tlâo, pă, êma – 1, 2, 3, 4, 5
- Năm, kjuh, sa-băn, dua-păn, pluh: 6, 7, 8, 9, 10
- Čar Mi/čar amêrik – America
- Čar Kŭr – Cambodia
- Anak – person
- Hriăm – learn
- Roă/ruă – sound of displeasure/pain
- Ƀuôn Ama Y'Thuôt – Buôn Ma Thuột (city)
- Čih – type/write
- Klei Mi – English
- Klei Êđê – Rade/Ede
- loo – A lot
- klei Prăng-xê – French
- mluk-crazy
