= Stictophaula =

Scientific classification
- Kingdom: Animalia
- Phylum: Arthropoda
- Class: Insecta
- Order: Orthoptera
- Suborder: Ensifera
- Family: Tettigoniidae
- Subfamily: Phaneropterinae
- Tribe: Holochlorini
- Genus: Stictophaula; Hebard, 1922

Type species
- Stictophaula bakeri Hebard, 1922

Genus of cricket-like animals

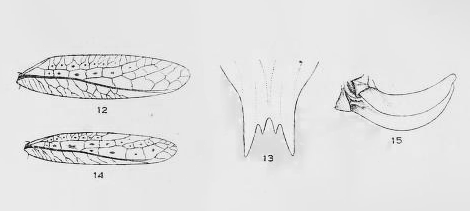
Stictophaula species sinistral tegmen (12, 14), subgenital plate (13), ovipositor (15)

Stictophaula is a genus of Asian Tettigoniidae (bush crickets or katydids) of the tribe Holochlorini within the subfamily Phaneropterinae. They are found in Indo-China, China, the Philippines, Malaysia, and western Indonesia.

The genus was originally erected in 1922 by Morgan Hebard in the Proceedings of the Academy of Natural Sciences of Philadelphia. The genus Stictophaula is most closely related to Phaula (now Phaulula), also in the tribe Holochlorini, differentiated by wing morphology including the shape of the veins, the male tergites, and female ovipositors.

== Species ==
The Orthoptera Species File lists:

1. Stictophaula annae Gorochov, 1998 – Borneo
2. Stictophaula armata Ingrisch, 1994 – Thailand
3. Stictophaula aspersa Gorochov & Voltshenkova, 2009 – Borneo
4. Stictophaula bakeri Hebard, 1922 – type species - Singapore
5. Stictophaula brevis (Liu, Zheng & Xi, 1991) - synonym Poecilopsyra brevis - China
6. Stictophaula bruneii Tan & Wahab, 2017
7. Stictophaula coco Gorochov & Voltshenkova, 2009 – Borneo
8. Stictophaula daclacensis Gorochov, 1998 - Đắk Lắk Province, Vietnam
9. Stictophaula dohrni Gorochov, 1998
10. Stictophaula elzbietae Gorochov, 1998
11. Stictophaula exigua Ingrisch, 1994
12. Stictophaula gialaiensis Gorochov, 1998
13. Stictophaula grigorenkoi Gorochov, 1998
14. Stictophaula mada Gorochov, 2011
15. Stictophaula micra Hebard, 1922
16. Stictophaula mikhaili Gorochov, 2004 – Indonesia
17. Stictophaula mistshenkoi Gorochov & Voltshenkova, 2009
18. Stictophaula multa Gorochov & Voltshenkova, 2009
19. Stictophaula omissa Gorochov, 2003
20. Stictophaula quadridens Hebard, 1922
21. Stictophaula rara Gorochov & Voltshenkova, 2009
22. Stictophaula recens Gorochov & Voltshenkova, 2009
23. Stictophaula sinica Gorochov & Kang, 2004
24. Stictophaula soekarandae Gorochov, 1998
25. Stictophaula spinosolaminata (Brunner von Wattenwyl, 1878)
26. Stictophaula thaiensis Gorochov, 1998

Note: S. ocellata Ingrisch, 1994 has now been placed in the genus Arnobia
