= Krông Buk district =

Coordinates: 12.833°N 108.083°E

Krông Búk district Huyện Krông Búk
- District
- Seal
- Interactive map of Krông Búk district
- Country: Vietnam
- Region: Central Highlands
- Province: Đắk Lắk province
- Capital: Chư Kbô

Area
  - Total: 138.5 sq mi (358.7 km^{2})

Population (2018)
  - Total: 62,648
- Time zone: UTC+7 (Indochina Time)

Krông Búk is a district (huyện) of Đắk Lắk province in the Central Highlands region of Vietnam. It was established as a district of the Socialist Republic of Vietnam in 1976 during the reunification of Vietnam.

As of December 2008, the district had a population of 55,733. The district covers an area of 358.7 km².

== History ==
On 30 August 1977, Ea Súp district was separated from Krông Buk District and established as its own district. On 3 April 1980, Ea H'leo district was separated from Krông Buk District and established as its own district. On 9 November 1987, Krông Năng district was separated from Krông Buk District and established as its own district. The municipality of Buôn Hồ was separated from Krông Buk District on 23 December 2008, and established as an independent entity under Đắk Lắk Province.
