= Mnong language =

Austroasiatic language spoken in Vietnam and Cambodia

Mnong
- Bunong, ឞូន៝ង
- Native to: Vietnam and Cambodia
- Region: throughout the Central Highlands, especially in Đắk Lắk, Lâm Đồng, and Đồng Nai (formerly Bình Phước); Mondulkiri in Cambodia
- Native speakers: 130,000 (2002–2008)
- Language family: Austroasiatic: Bahnaric; South Bahnaric; Sre–Mnong; Mnong
- Writing system: Khmer; Latin (Vietnamese alphabet)

Language codes
- ISO 639-3: Variously: cmo – Central Mnong mng – Eastern Mnong mnn – Southern Mnong rka – Kraol
- Glottolog: mnon1259
- ELP: Central Mnong
- Kraol
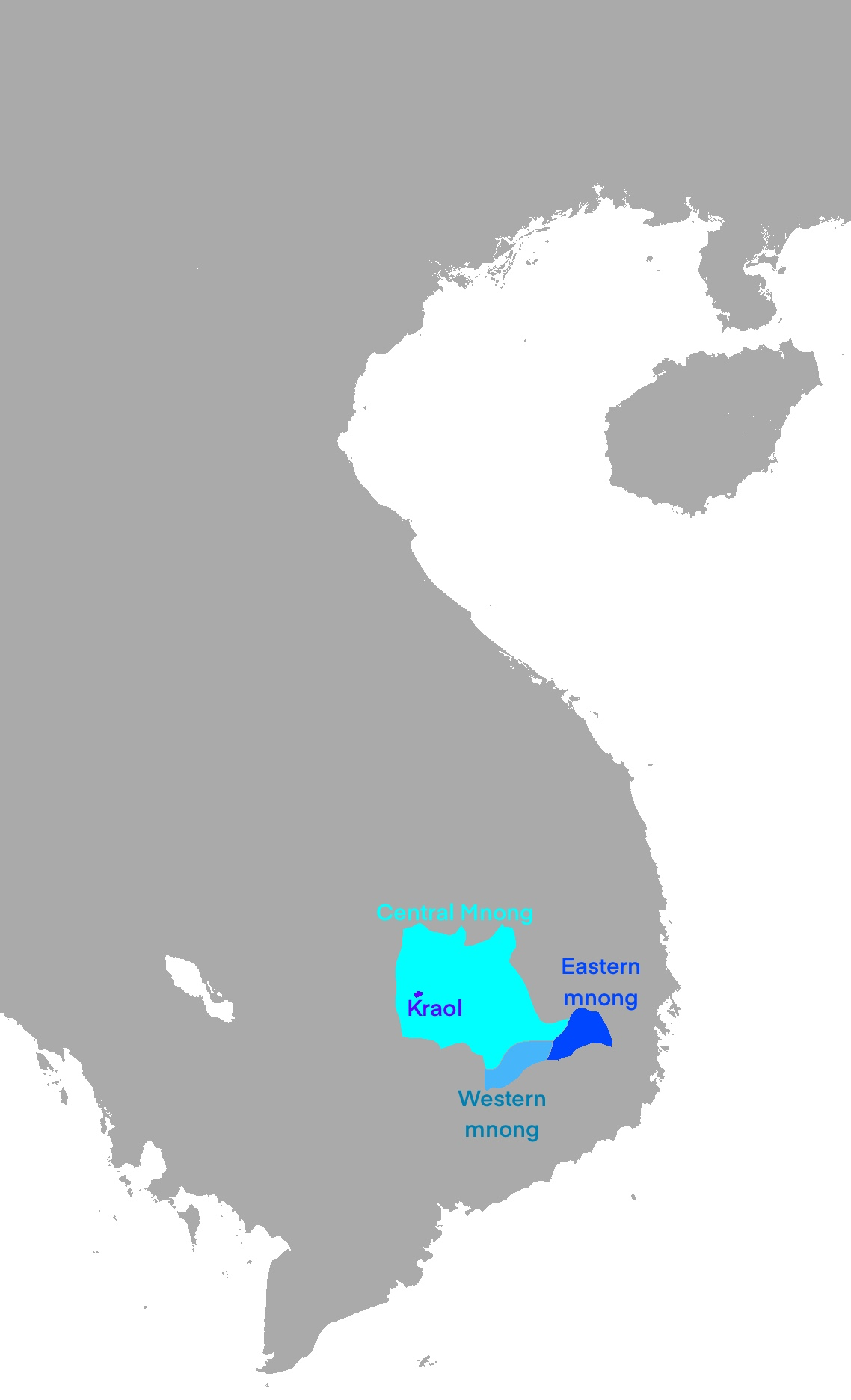

- Mnong is classified as Critically Endangered by the UNESCO Atlas of the World's Languages in Danger.

The Mnong language (also known as Pnong or Bunong) (Bunong: ឞូន៝ង) belongs to the Austro-Asiatic language family. It is spoken by the Mnong peoples of Vietnam and the Bunong of Cambodia.

== Distribution ==
In Vietnam, Mnong is spoken in the districts of Đăk Song, Đăk Mil, Đăk R'Lấp, Krông Nô, Gia Nghĩa, and other nearby locations in Đắk Nông (Nguyễn & Trương 2009).

== Varieties ==
According to Ethnologue, four major dialects exist: Central, Eastern and Southern Mnong (all spoken in Vietnam), and Kraol (spoken in Cambodia). Within a dialect group, members do not understand other dialects. The Mnong language was studied first by the linguist Richard Phillips in the early 1970s.

Lê, et al. (2014:234-235) lists the following subgroups of Mnong and their respective locations.

- Mnông Gar: in northwestern Lâm Đồng Province and southern Lak Lake.
- Mnông Nong: in Đắk Nông District and Đắk Min District
- Mnông Kuênh: in Krông Pắk District
- Mnông Pré: mainly in Đắk Nông District and Đắk Min District, and a few at Lak Lake.
- Mnông Prâng: scattered in Đắk Nông District and Đắk Min District, and a few in southern Lak Lake and in Bản Đon, Ea Súp District.
- Mnông Rlăm: in Lắk District. Many have close relationships with the Ê-đê people.
- Mnông Bu-đâng: in Bản Đon, Ea Súp District
- Mnông Chỉl: in Lắk District. Many have close relationships with the Ê-đê people. Some also live in Lạc Dương District and Đức Trọng District of Lâm Đồng Province.
- Mnông Bu Nor: in Đắk Nông District and Đắk Min District
- Mnông Dih Bri: very small population in Đắk Nông District; Êa Krông.
- Mnông Đíp: Đắk Min District and the northern part of former Sông Bé Province.
- Mnông Biat: small population in former Sông Bé Province. Majority living around the Vietnam-Cambodia border.
- Mnông Bu Đêh: in former Sông Bé Province and Đắk Lắk Province
- Mnông Si Tô: a group of Mạ (Mạ Tô) people in Đắk Nông District who have become assimilated into the Mnông population ("Mnông-ized" Mạ people)
- Mnông K’ah: a group of Ê-đê people scattered across Đắk Nông District, Lắk District, and M'Đrăk District who have become assimilated into the Mnông population ("Mnông-ized" Ê-đê people)
- Mnông Phê Đâm: small population living only in Quảng Tín commune, Đắk Nông District.

Other minor Mnong ethnic groups include the Mnông Rơ Đe, Mnông R’Ông, and Mnông K’Ziêng.

Nguyễn & Trương (2009) cover the following M'Nông dialects.

- M'Nông Preh
- Kuênh
- Mạ
- M'Nông Nâr (Bu Nâr)
- M'Nông Noong (Bu Noong)
- M'Nông R'Lâm
- M'Nông Prâng

== Phonology ==
=== Consonants ===
		Labial	Alveolar	Palatal	Velar	Glottal
Plosive	voiceless	p	t	c	k	ʔ
Plosive	aspirated	pʰ	tʰ	cʰ	kʰ	
Plosive	prenasal	ᵐp	ⁿt	ᶮc	ᵑk	
Plosive	implosive	ɓ	ɗ	(ʄ)	(ɠ)	
Nasal		m	n	ɲ	ŋ	
Fricative				ç		h
Rhotic			r			
Approximant	plain	w	l	j		
Approximant	preglottal	ʔw		ʔj		

- Implosives /ʄ, ɠ/ may vary across dialects.

=== Vowels ===
	Front	Central	Back
Close	i iː	ɨ ɨː	u uː
Mid	e eː	ə əː	o oː
Open	ɛ ɛː	a aː	ɔ ɔː

== Numerals ==
The following comparative numerals from various Mnong dialects are from Nguyễn & Trương (2009).

Gloss	Preh	Bu Noong	Bu Nâr	Prâng	R'Lăm	Mạ	Kuênh
1	du, ngoay, hŏ	muay	waay	dul	ju, ƀơn, muei	dul	đu
2	bar	bar	ra'r	baar	bar	bar	par
3	pê	pê	per	păi	pei	pê	
4	puăn	puăn	waam	puô	puan, puôn	puôn	
5	prăm	prăm	t'rơ̆m, năm	prăm, năm	prăm, pram	jorăm, sơ năm	snăm
6	prau			pro			
7	poh	poh	pops	pŏh	poh	poh	pêh
8	pham			pham			
9	dŭm, sĭn	sĭn	chĭnh	sin	sư̆n, sĭn	sin	
10	jât	jât	dư	joơt	măt	jơt	
