= Krông Năng (disambiguation) =

Krông Năng is a rural commune of Đắk Lắk province, Vietnam.

Krông Năng may also refer to several places in Vietnam:

- Krông Năng district, a former rural district of Đắk Lắk Province
- Krông Năng, Gia Lai, a former rural commune of Krông Pa district
- Krông Năng River, a river
