= Liên Sơn =

Liên Sơn may refer to several places in Vietnam, including:

- Liên Sơn, Đắk Lắk, a township and capital of Lắk District
- Liên Sơn, Bắc Giang, a commune of Tân Yên District
- Liên Sơn, Hà Nam, a commune of Kim Bảng District
- Liên Sơn, Hòa Bình, a commune of Lương Sơn District
- Liên Sơn, Lạng Sơn, a commune of Chi Lăng District
- Liên Sơn, Ninh Bình, a commune of Gia Viễn District
