= Quảng Phú =

Quảng Phú may refer to several places in Vietnam, including:

- Quảng Phú, Quảng Ngãi, a ward of Quảng Ngãi city
- Quảng Phú, Đắk Lắk, a township and capital of Cư M'gar district
- Quảng Phú, Thanh Hóa City, a rural commune of Thanh Hóa city, Thanh Hóa province
- Quảng Phú, Bắc Ninh, a rural commune of Lương Tài district
- Quảng Phú, Đắk Nông, a rural commune of Krông Nô district
- Quảng Phú, Quảng Bình, a rural commune of Quảng Trạch district
- Quảng Phú, Thọ Xuân, a rural commune of Thọ Xuân district, Thanh Hóa province
- Quảng Phú, Thừa Thiên - Huế, a rural commune of Quảng Điền district

== See also ==
- Quang Phú, a rural commune of Đồng Hới
