= Mnong =

Mnong may refer to:

- the Mnong people
- the Mnong language
