= Cư Kuin district =

Coordinates: 12°20′29″N 108°06′05″E

Cư Kuin district Huyện Cư Kuin
- District
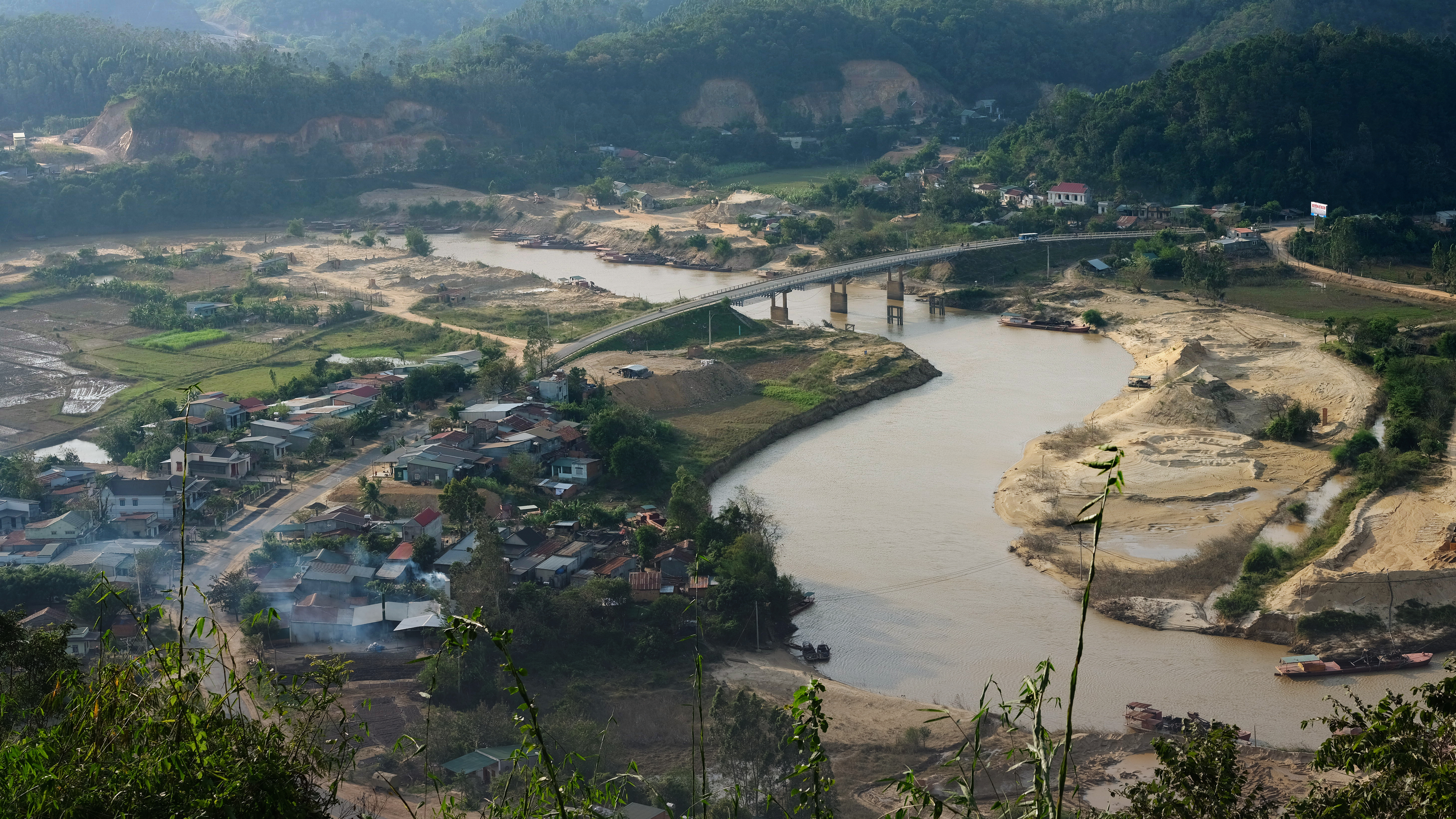
- Overlooking Đông Hòa Hiệp bridge
- Interactive map of Cư Kuin district
- Country: Vietnam
- Region: Central Highlands
- Province: Đắk Lắk

Area
  - Total: 111.3 sq mi (288.3 km^{2})

Population (2004)
  - Total: 109,770
- Time zone: UTC+7 (Indochina Time)
- Website: http://cukuin.net

Cư Kuin is a district of Đắk Lắk province in the Central Highlands of Vietnam. The district was established in 2007. Its area is approximately 288.3 km^{2}, and its population is about 109,770 people.

== Administration ==
Cư Kuin is divided into eight communes, including:

- Ea Ning
- Ea Tiêu
- Ea K'Tur
- Ea Bhôk
- Hòa Hiệp
- Dray Bhăng
- Ea Hu
- Cư Êwi
