= Ea Kar district =

Coordinates: 12.750°N 108.583°E

Ea Kar district Huyện Ea Kar
- District
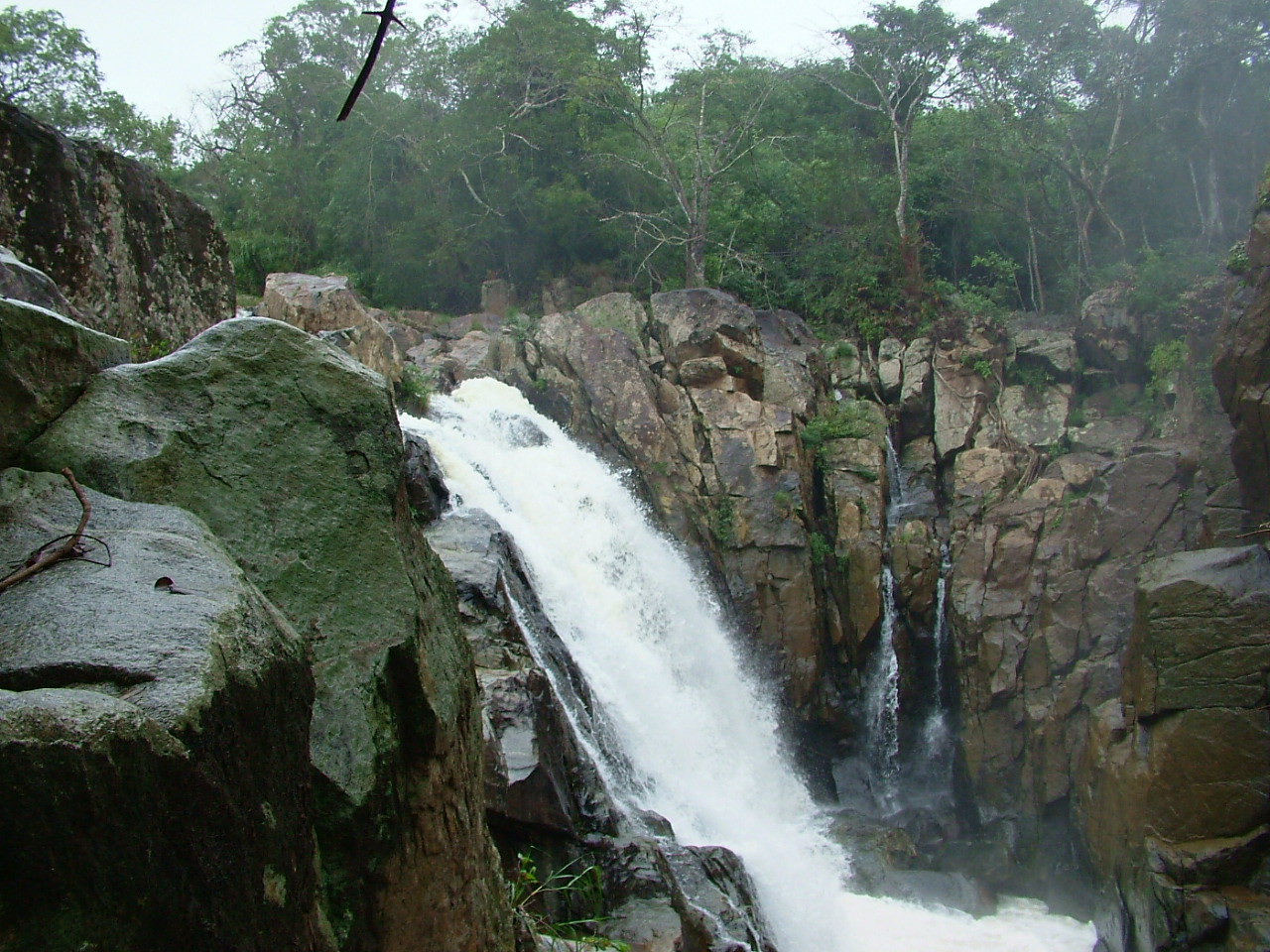
- Bay Waterfall in Ea Sô
- Interactive map of Ea Kar district
- Country: Vietnam
- Region: Central Highlands
- Province: Đắk Lắk province
- Capital: Ea Kar

Area
  - Total: 394 sq mi (1,021 km^{2})

Population (2018)
  - Total: 154,513
- Time zone: UTC+7 (Indochina Time)

Ea Kar (Vietnamese: Ea Kar) is a district (huyện) of Đắk Lắk province in the Central Highlands region of Vietnam.

As of 2003, the district had a population of 142,525. The district covers an area of 1,021 km². The district capital lies at Ea Kar.
