= Yang Tao =

Yang Tao may refer to:

- Tao Yang, Chinese-American computer scientist
- Yang Tao (speed skater), Chinese speed skater
- Yang Tao, Đắk Lắk, a rural commune of Lắk District, Đắk Lắk Province, Vietnam
