= Cư Prao =

- Commune
- Interactive map of Cư Prao
- Coordinates: 12°52′10″N 108°39′45″E
- Country: Vietnam
- Region: Central Highlands
- Province: Đắk Lắk
- Time zone: UTC+07:00 (Indochina Time)

Cư Prao is a commune of Đắk Lắk province, Vietnam.

== History ==
Its name Cư Prao means "the hill of white-crested laughingthrushes" in Rhade language.

== Geography ==
Cu Prao contains 14 villages and hamlets. Hnang Hydropower has invested in water development in the commune.
