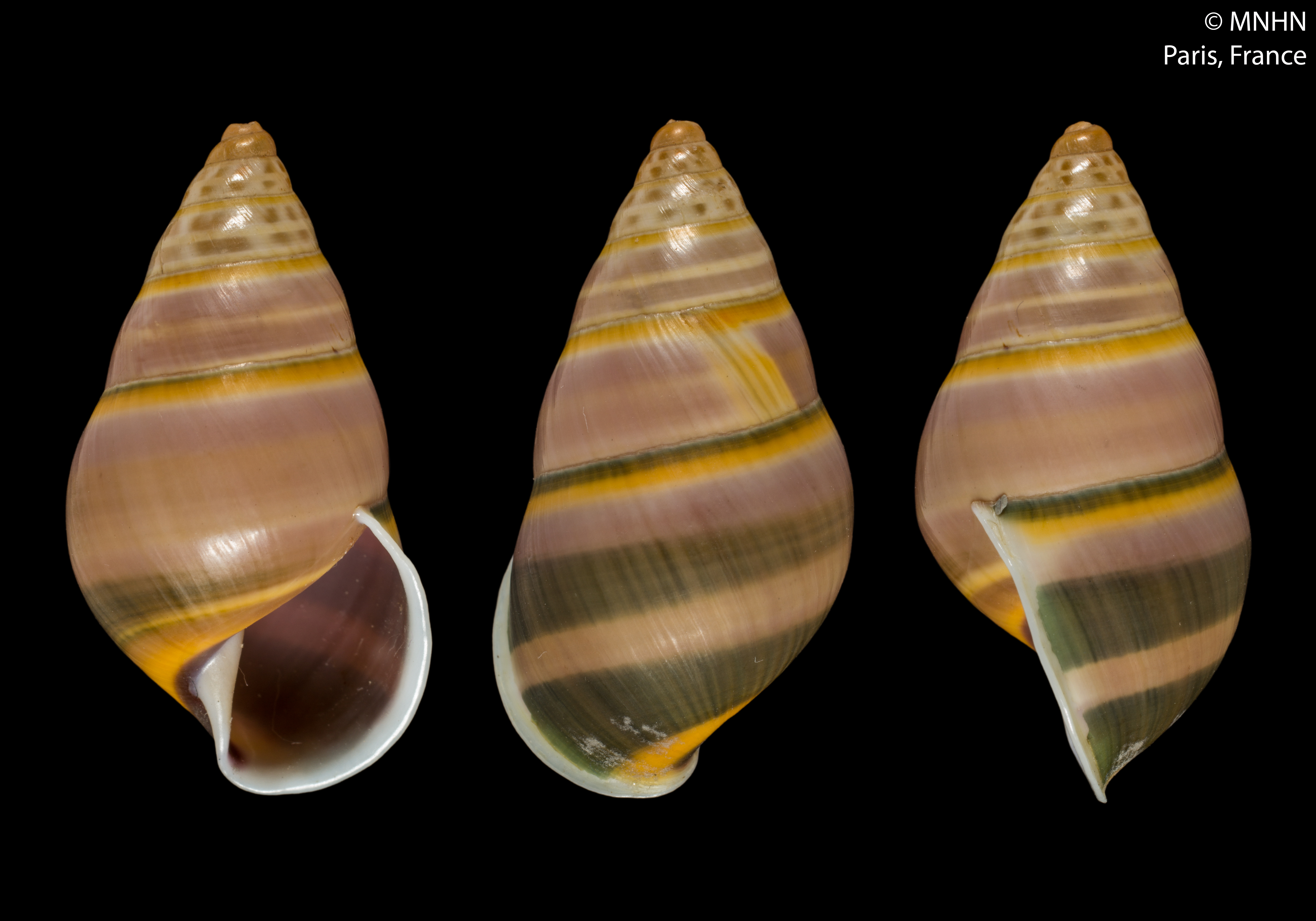
- Shell of Amphidromus nicoi (holotype at MNHN, Paris)

Scientific classification
- Kingdom: Animalia
- Phylum: Mollusca
- Class: Gastropoda
- Order: Stylommatophora
- Family: Camaenidae
- Genus: Amphidromus
- Species: A. nicoi

Binomial name
- Amphidromus nicoi Thach, 2017

= Amphidromus nicoi =

Species of snail in the family Camaenidae

Amphidromus nicoi is a species of medium-sized air-breathing tree snail, an arboreal gastropod mollusk in the family Camaenidae.

== Distribution ==
The type locality of this species is Krong Pak District; Vietnam.
