= Phú Lộc =

Phú Lộc may refer to several places in Vietnam:

- Phú Lộc District, a rural district of Huế
- Phú Lộc, Sóc Trăng, a township and capital of Thạnh Trị District
- Phú Lộc, Huế, a township and capital of Phú Lộc District
- Phú Lộc, An Giang, a commune of Tân Châu, An Giang
- Phú Lộc, Đắk Lắk, a commune of Krông Năng District
- Phú Lộc, Đồng Nai, a commune of Tân Phú District, Đồng Nai
- Phú Lộc, Hà Tĩnh, a commune of Can Lộc District
- Phú Lộc, Ninh Bình, a commune of Nho Quan District
- Phú Lộc, Phú Thọ, a commune of Phù Ninh District
- Phú Lộc, Thanh Hóa, a commune of Hậu Lộc District
- Phú Lộc, Vĩnh Long, a commune of Tam Bình District
