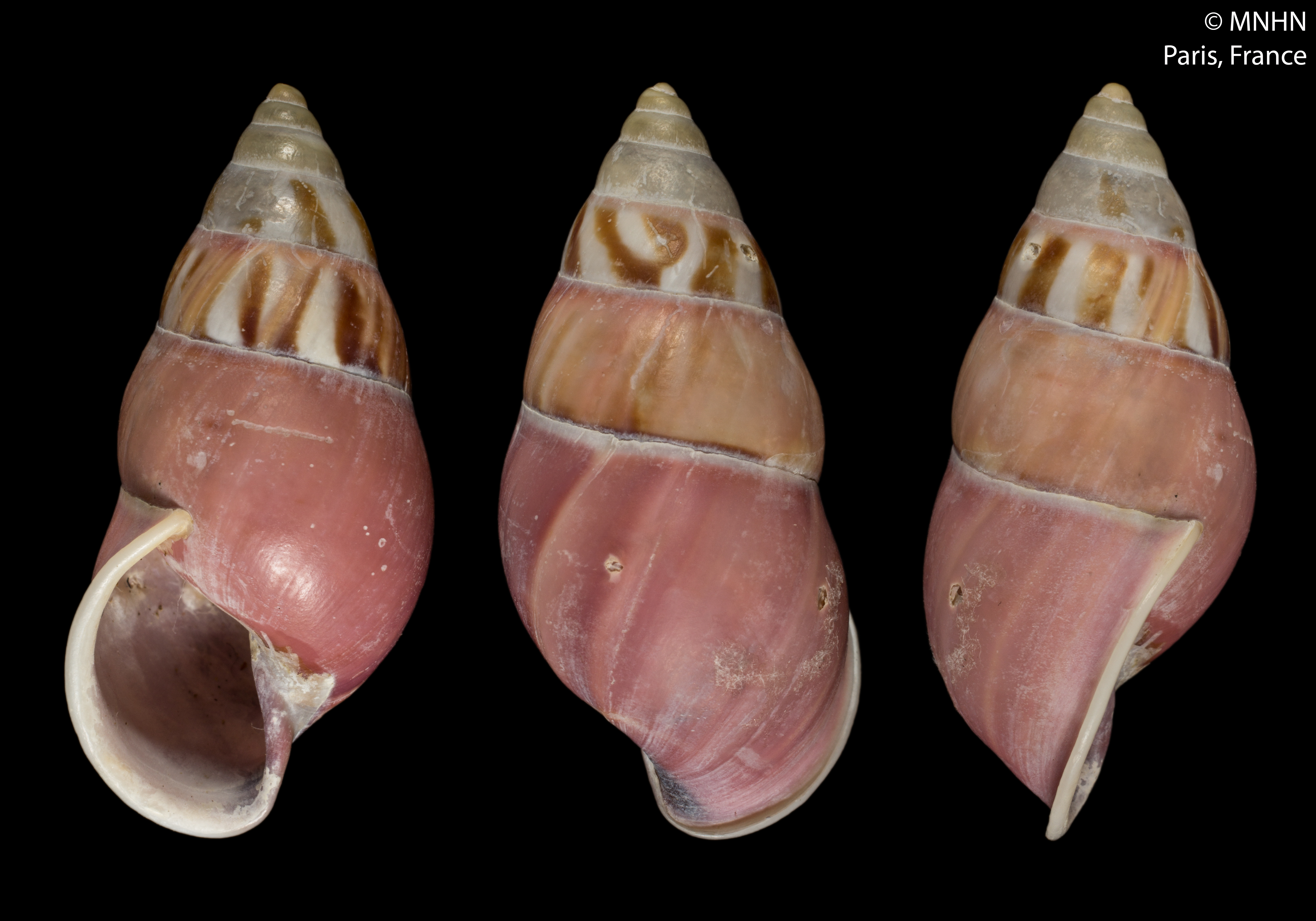
- Shell of Amphidromus abbotthuberorum (holotype at MNHN, Paris)

Scientific classification
- Kingdom: Animalia
- Phylum: Mollusca
- Class: Gastropoda
- Order: Stylommatophora
- Family: Camaenidae
- Genus: Amphidromus
- Species: A. abbotthuberorum

Binomial name
- Amphidromus abbotthuberorum Thach, 2017

= Amphidromus abbotthuberorum =

Species of snail in the family Camaenidae

Amphidromus abbotthuberorum is a species of medium-sized air-breathing tree snail, an arboreal gastropod mollusk in the family Camaenidae.

== Habitat ==
This species lives on trees.

== Distribution ==
The type locality of this species is Đắk Lắk Province, Vietnam.

== Etymology ==
This species is named after Phạm Quốc Bảo for encouraging him in malacological study .
