= Cư M'gar =

Cư M'gar Xã Cư M'gar
- Rural commune
- Location within Vietnam
- Coordinates: 12°49′54″N 108°3′0″E
- Country: Vietnam
- Region: Central Highlands
- Province: Đắk Lắk
- Established: June 16, 2025

Area
  - Total: 44.39 sq mi (114.98 km^{2})

Population (2024)
  - Total: 32,368
- Time zone: UTC+7 (UTC + 7)
- Administrative code: 24280
- Website: http://cumgar.daklak.gov.vn/

Cư M'gar is a rural commune (xã) of Đắk Lắk Province, Vietnam.
