= Lak Lake =

Lake in Vietnam

Coordinates: 12°25′21″N 108°10′48″E

- Vietnamese: Hồ Lắk
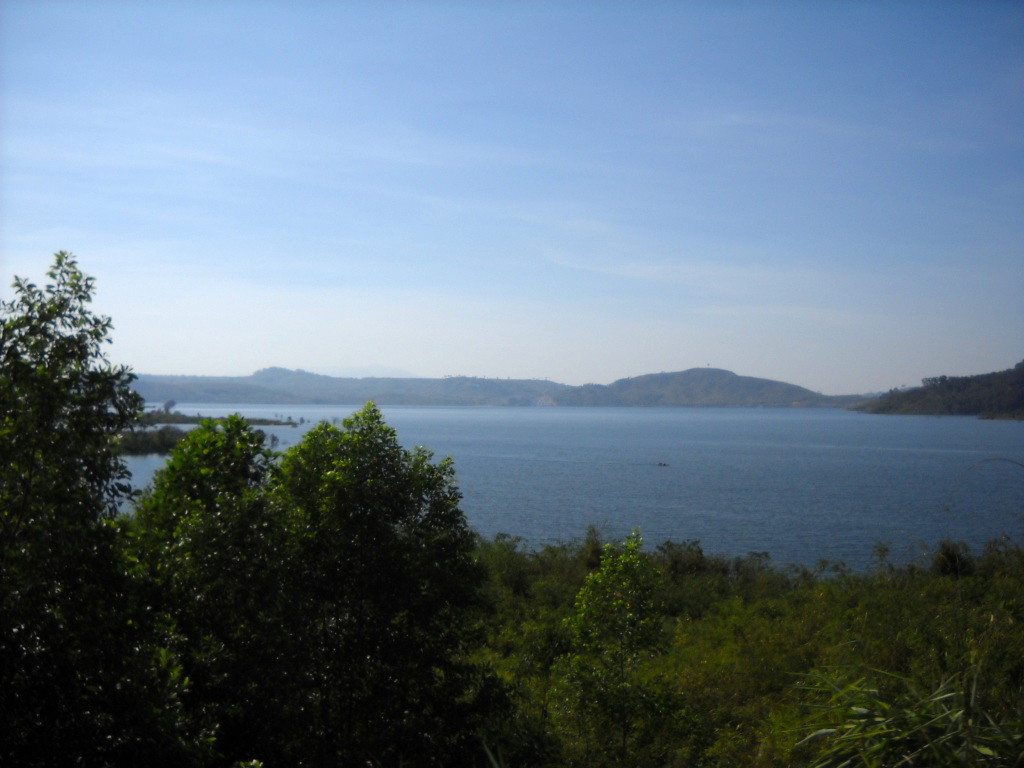
- Lak Lake

- Location within Vietnam
- Interactive map of Lak Lake
- Location: Liên Sơn Lắk Commune, Đắk Lắk province
- Type: Lake
- Basin countries: Vietnam
- Surface area: 6.2 km^{2} (2.4 sq mi)
- Surface elevation: 500 m (1,600 ft)
- Settlements: Buon Ma Thuot

Lak Lake (Vietnamese: Hồ Lắk) is a freshwater lake in Liên Sơn Lắk Commune, Đắk Lắk province, Vietnam. It covers an area of about 6.2 km^{2} (2.4 sq mi) and is the largest freshwater lake in the Central Highlands. It is also the second largest natural freshwater lake in Vietnam.

Lak Lake is 55 km (34 mi) away from the center of Buon Ma Thuot, and the upper reaches of the Chư Yang Sin Mountains with an altitude of 2,442 m (8,012 ft). Even in the dry season, the water source of Lak Lake rarely dries up. And the place with the largest number of domesticated elephants has a rich ecosystem of flora and fauna, some of which are listed in the Red Book of Endangered Wildlife in Vietnam.

The lake is the rice field of the Mnong people. According to the local legend of the Mnong people, a long time ago, the god of fire defeated the god of water, which brought severe drought to the village of the Mnong people, so the villagers moved to settle near Lak Lake. Lok Lake is the place where Bao Dai, the last emperor of the Nguyen dynasty, went to Buon Ma Thuot for summer vacation and hunting. On a hill by the lake, there is Bao Dai's palace, which is a three-story building with modern architectural style. Each room has wide windows with views on all sides.
