= Đăk R'Lấp district =

Đắk R'lấp district Huyện Đắk R'lấp
- District
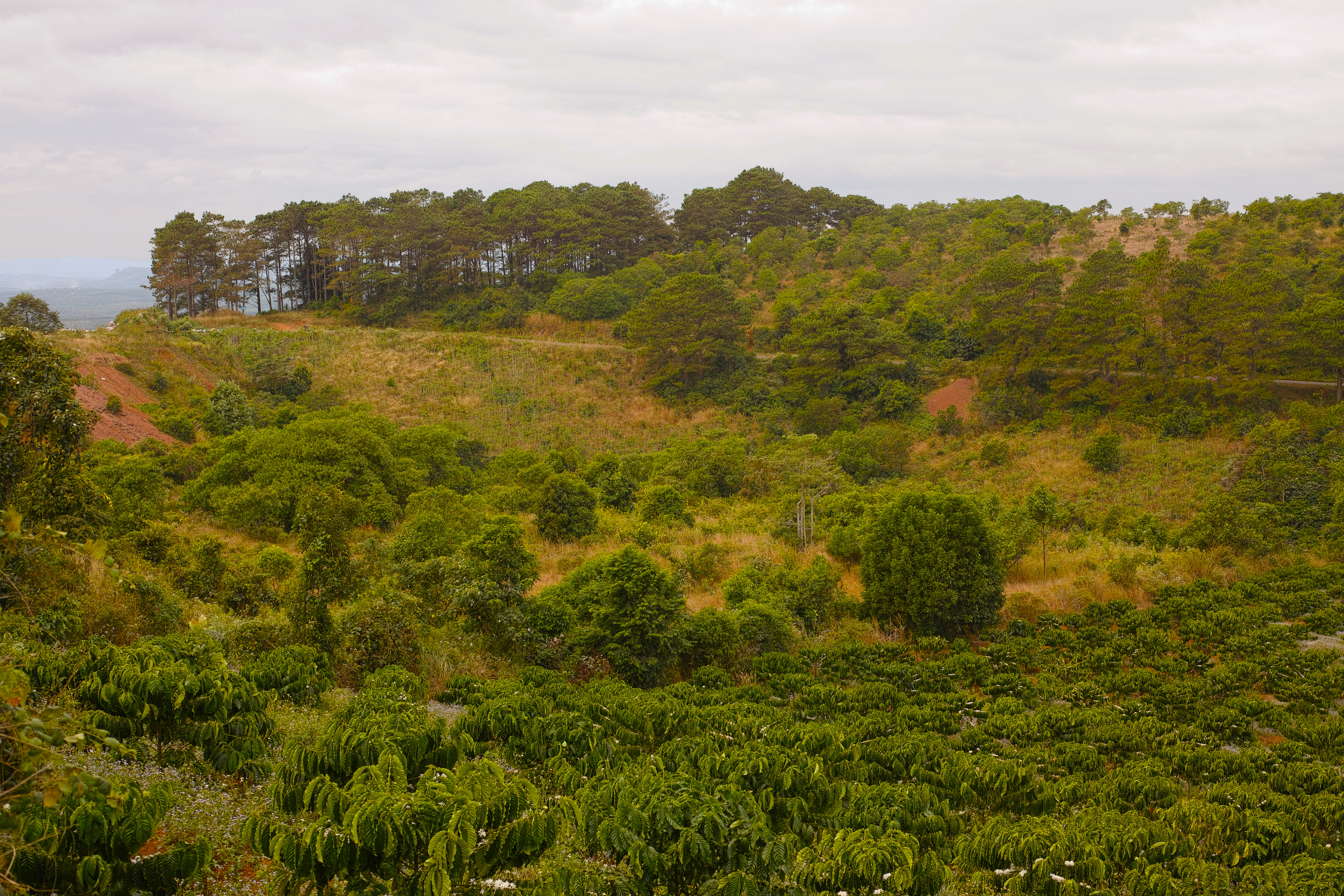
- Coffee plantation near Kiến Đức town

- Seal
- Interactive map of Đắk R'lấp district
- Country: Vietnam
- Region: Central Highlands
- Province: Đắk Nông
- Capital: Kiến Đức

Area
  - Total: 245.43 sq mi (635.67 km^{2})

Population (2017)
  - Total: 88,329
- Time zone: UTC+7 (Indochina Time)

Đắk R'lấp is a former rural district (huyện) of Đắk Nông province in the Central Highlands region of Vietnam.

== History ==
Its name Đắk R'lấp or Daak Mdr-laap means "the stream of the lion" from Raglai language, what is related with Srepok River.

== Geography ==
As of 2017 the district had a population of 88,329. The district covers an area of 635,67 km² (In 2007, Đắk R'lấp district was divided into 2 districts: Tuy Đức and Đắk R'lấp). The district capital lies at Kiến Đức.

Đắk R'lấp District includes :

- 1 township : Kiến Đức
- 10 communes : Nhân Cơ, Đăk Wer, Kiến Thành, Đạo Nghĩa, Nghĩa Thắng, Nhân Đạo, Đăk Sin, Quảng Tín, Hưng Bình, Đăk Ru.
