= Ea H'leo district =

Ea H'leo district Huyện Ea H'leo
- District
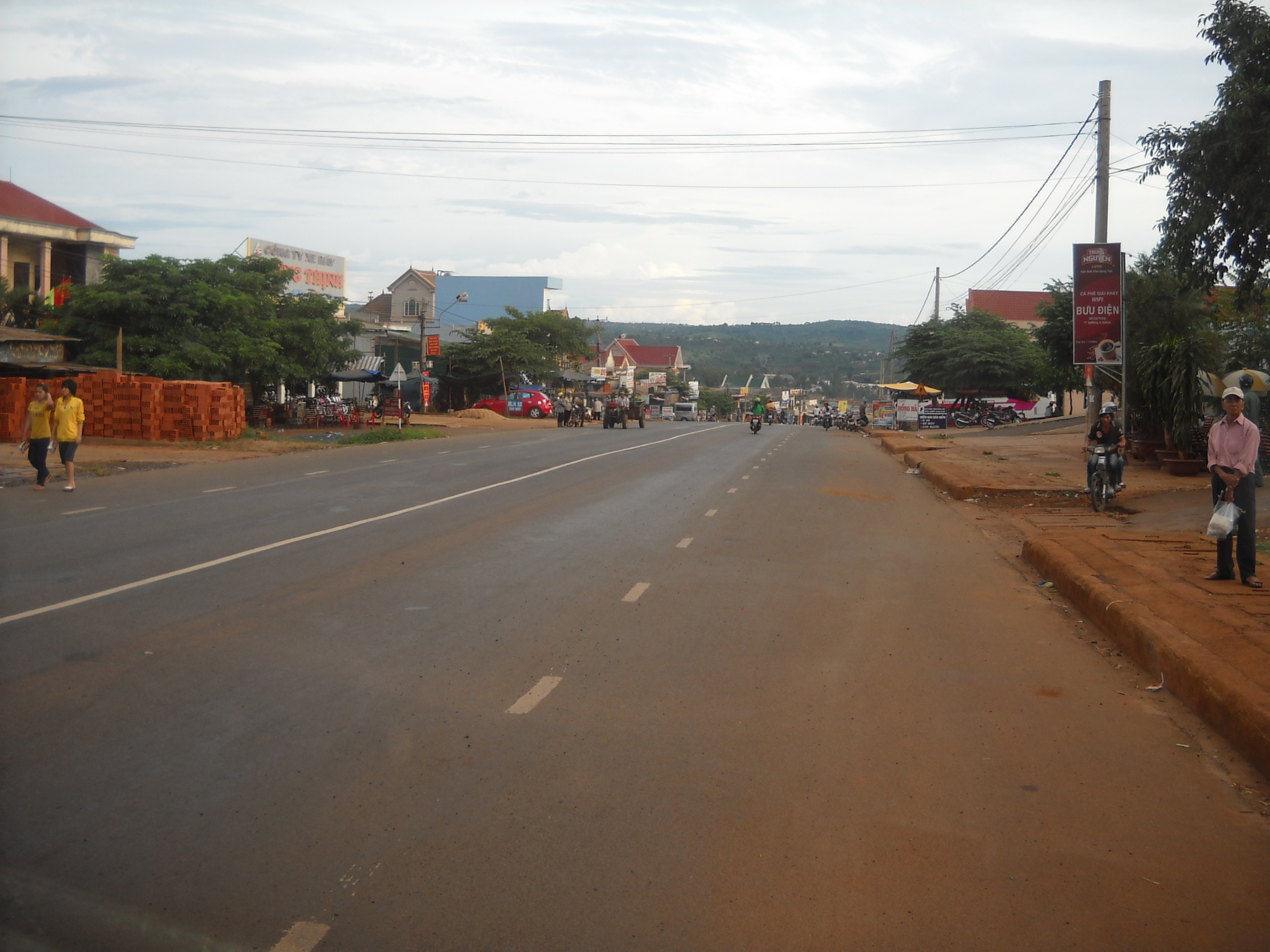
- View of the road in Ea Drăng township

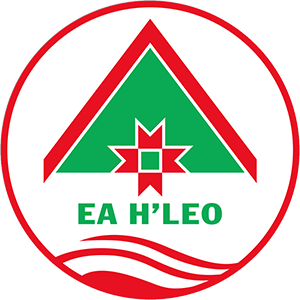
- Seal
- Interactive map of Ea H'leo district
- Country: Vietnam
- Region: Central Highlands
- Province: Đắk Lắk province
- Capital: Ea Drăng

Government
  - Type: District People's Committee

Area
  - Total: 514 sq mi (1,331 km^{2})

Population (2018)
  - Total: 128,347
- Time zone: UTC+7 (Indochina Time)

Ea H'Leo is a district in Dak Lak province, Vietnam. The district is named after Ea H'Leo Stream, a large stream that flows through the district.

== Geography ==
Ea H'Leo District is located at the northern gateway of Dak Lak province. The district center is Ea Drang town, 80 km north of Buon Ma Thuot city and 100 km south of Pleiku city along National Highway 14.

The district has the following geographical boundaries:

- To the east, it borders Ayun Pa town and Krong Pa district of Gia Lai province
- To the west, it borders Ea Sup district
- To the south, it borders Cu M'gar, Krong Buk, and Krong Nang districts
- To the north, it borders Chu Puh and Phu Thien districts of Gia Lai province.

Ea H'Leo is a land in the Central Highlands with many forest and land resources. Rubber and coffee are the two main industrial crops, bringing significant income to the residents.

Regarding resources, the Ea Ral water pine conservation area is notable for preserving tree species from prehistoric times, contemporaneous with dinosaurs. Currently, this place is one of the only two places in Dak Lak and the world that still have populations of these tree species.

Ea Nam Wind Farm (Ea H'Leo) photographed from Flycam Ea H'Leo is a district with many wind farms located in several communes. In recent years, Ea H'Leo district has seen the emergence of numerous wind farms built by various companies. The wind turbines in Dlie Yang commune include 12 turbines, and in Ea Nam commune, there are 84 turbines (Trung Nam Group), which are now operational and attract many visitors.

== Administration ==
Ea H'Leo district has 12 commune-level administrative units, including Ea Drang town (the district capital) and 11 communes: Cu A Mung, Cu Mot, Ea Hiao, Ea H'Leo, Ea Khal, Ea Nam, Ea Ral, Ea Sol, Ea Tir, Ea Wy, and Dlie Yang.

== History ==
During the French colonial period, the current Ea H'Leo district was part of Buon Ho district, one of the five earliest administrative units established in Dak Lak province.

During the period of resistance against the Americans, the Saigon government changed the administrative boundaries of the two provinces, Darlac and Pleiku. At that time, most of the district belonged to Cheo Reo district, Pleiku province. On September 1, 1962, according to Decree No. 186, the government decided to separate a part of southern Pleiku province and northern Darlac province to establish a new province named Phu Bon, with four districts: Cheo Reo, Phu Tuc, Phu Thien, and Thuan Man. Ea H'Leo district was then part of Thuan Man district. Thuan Man district headquarters was located 15 km southwest of the Phu Bon provincial capital (Cheo Reo). Today, although the name Thuan Man district no longer exists, this name is still used for Thuan Man Primary School and Thuan Man Forestry.

After 1975, the southern part of Thuan Man district was transferred to Dak Lak province.

On April 3, 1980, the Government Council issued Decision 110-CP[1]. Accordingly, four communes: Ea Sol, Ea H'Leo, Ea Khal, and Dlie Yang of Krong Buk district were separated to establish Ea H'Leo district.

When it was first established, Ea H'Leo district consisted of the aforementioned four communes. The district headquarters was located in Ea Khal commune.

On September 17, 1981, two communes: Ea Wy and Cu Mot were established.[3]

On January 17, 1984, the Council of Ministers issued Decision 13-HDBT[4]. Accordingly:

- Divided Ea Khal commune into two communes: Ea Khal and Ea Ral
- Divided Ea Sol commune into two communes: Ea Sol and Ea Hiao.

Between 1988-1994, the district established an additional commune: Ea Nam.

On January 9, 1998, Ea Drang town (Ea H'Leo district capital) was established on the basis of 1,688 hectares of natural area and 12,275 people of Ea Khal commune.[5]

On November 26, 2003, the National Assembly issued Resolution 22/2003/QH11, dividing Dak Lak province into two provinces: Dak Lak and Dak Nong[6], with Ea Sup district belonging to Dak Lak province.

On May 16, 2006, Cu A Mung commune was established on the basis of 7,435 hectares of natural area and 3,491 people of Ea Wy commune.[7]

On August 27, 2007, Ea Tir commune was established on the basis of adjusting 9,802 hectares of natural area and 3,239 people of Ea Nam commune.[8]

Ea H'Leo district currently has one town and 11 communes.

On April 1, 2016, the Ministry of Construction issued Decision No. 313/QD-BXD, recognizing Ea Drang town as a Grade IV urban area.[9]

== See also ==
- Đắk Lắk province
