= Krông Búk =

Krông Búk Xã Krông Búk
- Rural commune
- Krông Búk commune
- Location within Vietnam
- Coordinates: 13°01′34″N 108°13′11″E
- Country: Vietnam
- Region: Central Highlands
- Province: Đắk Lắk
- Time zone: UTC+7 (UTC + 7)

Krông Búk is a rural commune (xã) of Đắk Lắk Province, Vietnam.

On June 16, 2025, the Standing Committee of the National Assembly issued Resolution No. 1660/NQ-UBTVQH15 on the reorganization of commune-level administrative units in Đắk Lắk Province in 2025 (the resolution took effect on the date of its adoption). Accordingly, the entire natural area and population of Cư Né Commune and Chứ Kbô Commune were consolidated to establish a new commune named Krông Búk Commune.
