= Đắk Song district =

Đắk Song district Huyện Đắk Song
- District
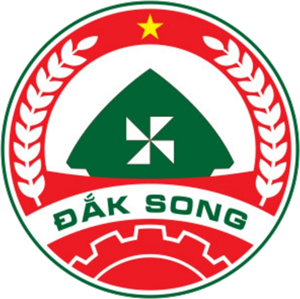
- Seal
- Interactive map of Đắk Song district
- Country: Vietnam
- Region: Central Highlands
- Province: Đắk Nông
- Capital: Đắk Song

Area
  - Total: 312 sq mi (808 km^{2})

Population (2003)
  - Total: 41,774
- Time zone: UTC+7 (Indochina Time)

Đắk Song is a former rural district (huyện) of Đắk Nông province in the Central Highlands region of Vietnam.

== Geography ==
As of 2003 the district had a population of 41,774. The district covers an area of 808 km². The district capital lies at Đắk Song.

== History ==
Its name Đắc Song (Kinh language) was from old name Daàk-sơng in Mnong language. It means "the stream of pine trees".

However, there is a paradox is that, this name came from a gossip of the Kinh people reclaiming in the middle of the 20th century : Suối Tùng. It means "the spring of pine trees".

== Culture ==
Today Dak Song is still praised by Vietnamese media as an "ideal land" for the development of the most elite pine trees, which provides abundant raw materials for the steaming industry of the room oil processing in Saigon and surrounding areas.
