= Dray Bhăng =

Dray Bhăng Xã Dray Bhăng
- Rural commune
- Dray Bhăng commune
- Location within Vietnam
- Coordinates: 12°33′40″N 108°09′49″E
- Country: Vietnam
- Region: Central Highlands
- Province: Đắk Lắk
- District: Cư Kuin

Area
  - Total: 16.06 sq mi (41.59 km^{2})

Population (2019)
  - Total: 9,294
  - Density: 578.8/sq mi (223.5/km^{2})
- Time zone: UTC+7 (UTC + 7)
- Administrative code: 24561

Dray Bhăng is a rural commune (xã) of Đắk Lắk Province, Vietnam.

== Administration ==
Dray Bhăng commune has 5 villages/hamlets, including 3 villages: Kim Châu, Nam Hòa, Lô 13 and 2 hamlets: Hra Êa Tlǎ, Hra Êa Hning.
