= Krông Pắc =

Krông Pắc Xã Krông Pắc
- Commune
- Krông Pắc commune
- Location within Vietnam
- Coordinates: 12°42′38″N 108°18′28″E
- Country: Vietnam
- Region: Central Highlands
- Province: Đắk Lắk
- Time zone: UTC+7 (UTC + 7)

Krông Pắc is a commune (xã) of Đắk Lắk Province, Vietnam.

On June 16, 2025, the Standing Committee of the National Assembly issued Resolution No. 1660/NQ-UBTVQH15 on the reorganization of commune-level administrative units in Đắk Lắk Province in 2025 (the resolution took effect on the date of its adoption). Accordingly, the entire natural area and population of Phước An Township and the communes of Hòa An (Krông Pắc District), Ea Yông, and Hòa Tiến were consolidated to establish a new commune named Krông Pắc Commune.
