= Bình Kiến =

Ward of Đắk Lắk province

- Ward
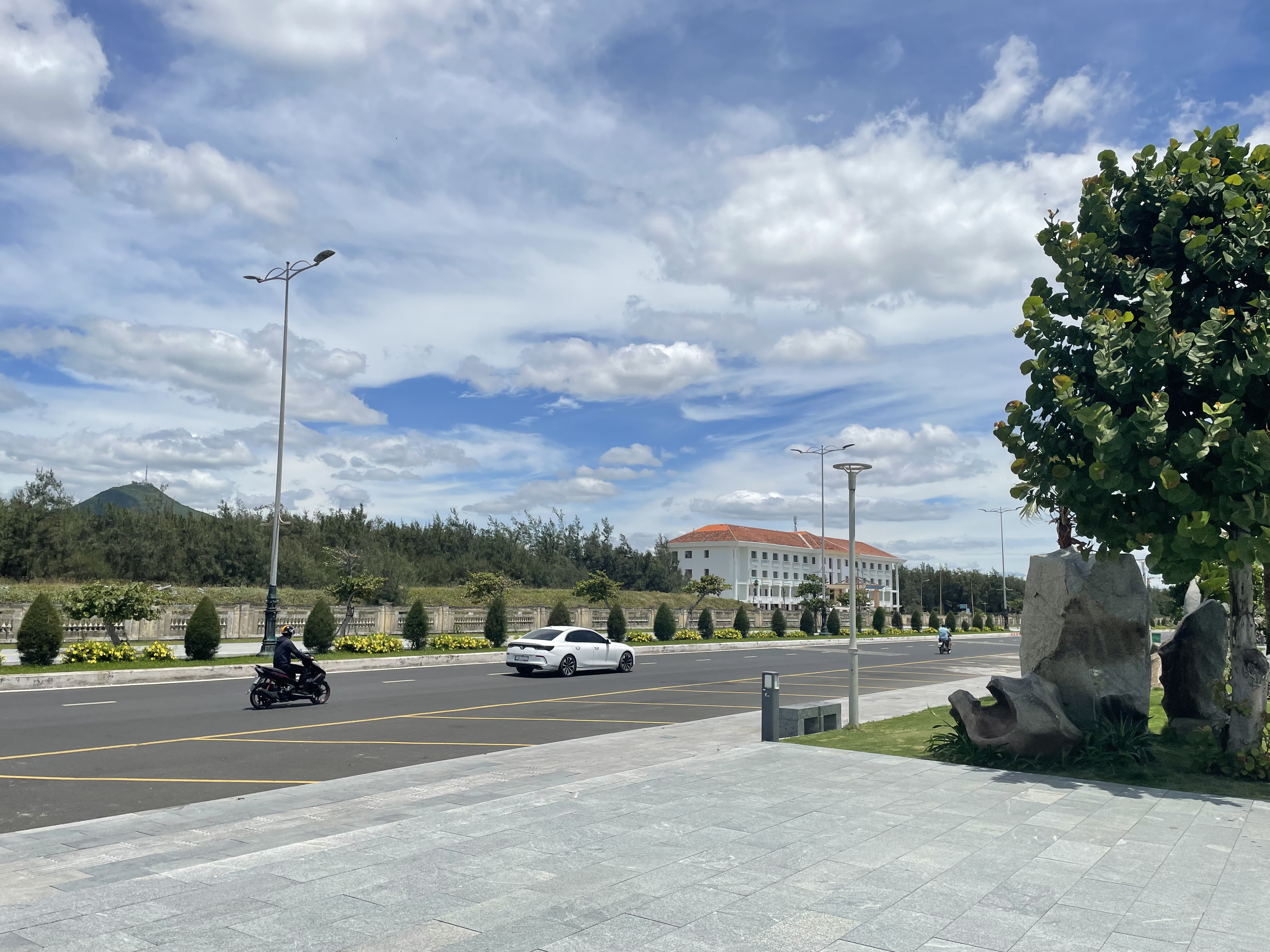
- Area near Nghinh Phong Tower
- Interactive map of Bình Kiến
- Coordinates: 13°07′34″N 109°16′49″E
- Country: Vietnam
- Region: Central Highlands
- Province: Đắk Lắk

Area
  - Total: 73.71 km^{2} (28.46 sq mi)

Population
  - Total: 44,406
  - Density: 602.4/km^{2} (1,560/sq mi)
- Time zone: UTC+07:00 (ICT)
- Administrative code: 22045
- Website: binhkien.daklak.gov.vn (in Vietnamese)

Bình Kiến (Phường Bình Kiến) is a ward (phường) of Đắk Lắk province in the Central Highlands region of Vietnam.

== Sister cities ==
- (Vietnam) Tân An, Đắk Lắk.
