= Đắk Song =

- Commune
- Interactive map of Đắk Song
- Coordinates: 12.401859451605457°N 107.64703607556152°E
- Country: Vietnam
- Region: South Central Coast and Central Highlands
- Province: Lâm Đồng
- Established: 2025

Area
  - Total: 193.19 km^{2} (74.59 sq mi)

Population (2025)
  - Total: 12,701
  - Density: 65/km^{2} (170/sq mi)

Đắk Song is a commune in Lâm Đồng province, Vietnam.

On 16 June 2025, the Standing Committee of the National Assembly of Vietnam issued Resolution No. 1656/NQ-UBTVQH15 on the arrangement of commune-level administrative units in Lâm Đồng province. Under the resolution, Đắk Song commune was established through the merger of the entire area and population of Đắk Môl and Đắk Hòa communes, formerly part of Đắk Song district, Đắk Nông province.
