= Ea Knốp =

Ea Knốp Xã Ea Knốp
- Commune
- Ea Knốp commune
- Location within Vietnam
- Coordinates: 12°48′24″N 108°32′26″E
- Country: Vietnam
- Region: Central Highlands
- Province: Đắk Lắk
- Time zone: UTC+7 (UTC + 7)

Ea Knốp is a commune (xã) of Đắk Lắk Province, Vietnam.
