= Quảng Phú, Đắk Lắk =

Quảng Phú Xã Quảng Phú
- Commune
- Quảng Phú commune
- Location within Vietnam
- Coordinates: 12°49′23″N 108°04′40″E
- Country: Vietnam
- Region: Central Highlands
- Province: Đắk Lắk
- Time zone: UTC+7 (UTC + 7)

Quảng Phú is a commune (xã) of Đắk Lắk Province, Vietnam.

On June 16, 2025, the Standing Committee of the National Assembly issued Resolution No. 1660/NQ-UBTVQH15 on the reorganization of commune-level administrative units in Đắk Lắk Province in 2025 (the resolution took effect on the date of its adoption). Accordingly, the entire natural area and population of Quảng Phú Township, Ea Pốk Township, Cư Suê Commune, and Quảng Tiến Commune were consolidated to establish a new commune named Quảng Phú Commune.
