= Ea Kar =

Ea Kar Xã Ea Kar
- Commune
- Location within Vietnam
- Coordinates: 12°48′35″N 108°26′55″E
- Country: Vietnam
- Region: Central Highlands
- Province: Đắk Lắk
- Time zone: UTC+7 (UTC + 7)

Ea Kar is a commune (xã) of Đắk Lắk Province, in the Central Highlands region of Vietnam.
