= Kiến Đức =

Kiến Đức Xã Kiến Đức
- Commune
- Kiến Đức commune
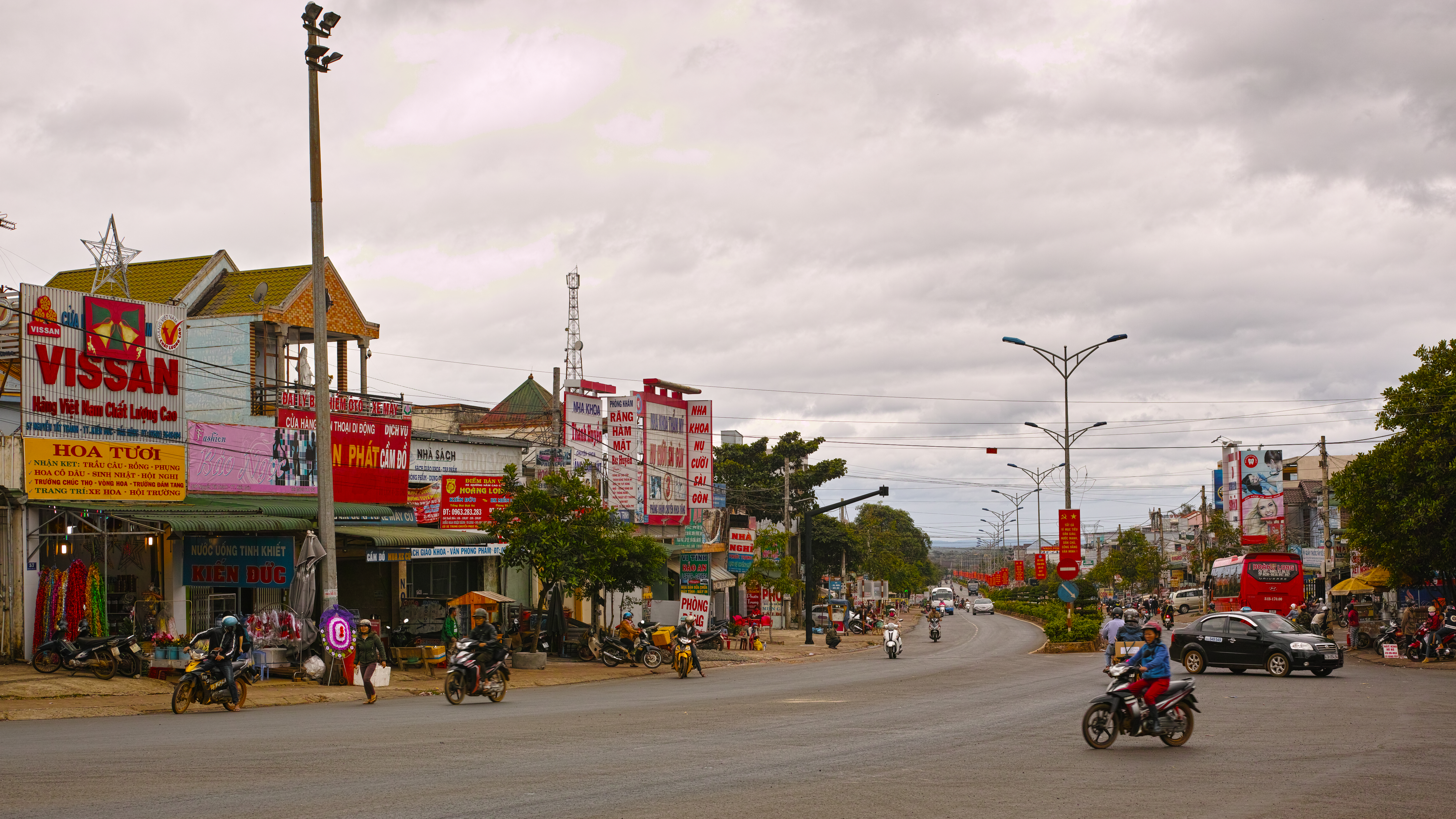

- Location within Vietnam
- Coordinates: 11°59′47″N 107°30′43″E
- Country: Vietnam
- Region: Central Highlands
- Province: Lâm Đồng
- Time zone: UTC+7 (UTC + 7)

Kiến Đức is a commune (xã) of Lâm Đồng Province, Vietnam.
