= Krông Pắk district =

Coordinates: 12.667°N 108.333°E

Krông Pắk district Huyện Krông Pắk
- District
- Interactive map of Krông Pắk district
- Country: Vietnam
- Region: Central Highlands
- Province: Đắk Lắk province
- Capital: Phước An

Area
  - Total: 241 sq mi (623 km^{2})

Population (2003)
  - Total: 212,067
- Time zone: UTC+7 (Indochina Time)

Krông Pắk is a district (huyện) of Đắk Lắk province in the Central Highlands region of Vietnam.

As of 2003 the district had a population of 212,067. The district covers an area of 623 km^{2} (241 sq mi). The district capital lies at Phước An.
