= Ea Drăng =

Ea Drăng Xã Ea Drăng
- Commune
- Ea Drăng commune
- Location within Vietnam
- Coordinates: 13°12′23″N 108°12′27″E
- Country: Vietnam
- Region: Central Highlands
- Province: Đắk Lắk
- Time zone: UTC+7 (UTC + 7)

Ea Drăng is a commune (xã) of Đắk Lắk Province, Vietnam.
