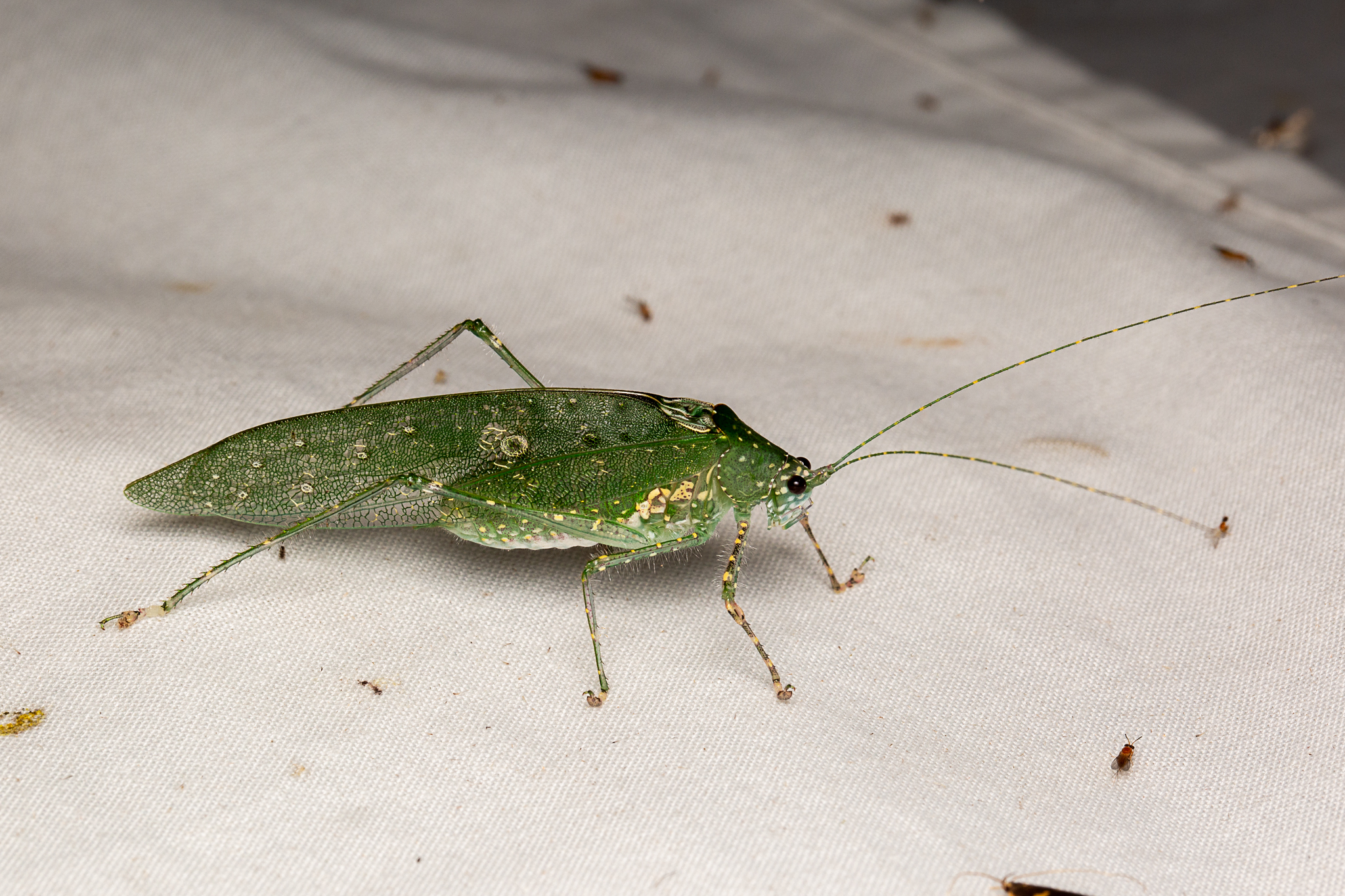
- Arnobia trichopus

Scientific classification
- Domain: Eukaryota
- Kingdom: Animalia
- Phylum: Arthropoda
- Class: Insecta
- Order: Orthoptera
- Suborder: Ensifera
- Family: Tettigoniidae
- Subfamily: Phaneropterinae
- Tribe: Holochlorini
- Genus: Arnobia; Stål, 1876

= Arnobia =

Genus of cricket-like animals

Arnobia is a genus of Asian bush crickets of the tribe Holochlorini within the subfamily Phaneropterinae.

== Species ==
The Orthoptera Species File lists the following species recorded from Indo-China, eastern China (including Taiwan), Japan and Malesia:

- Arnobia guangxiensis Liu, 2011
- Arnobia hainanensis Liu, 2011
- Arnobia inocellata Gorochov, 1998
- Arnobia ocellata (Ingrisch, 1994)
- Arnobia pilipes Haan, 1842 - type species (as Locusta pilipes Haan = A. pilipes pilipes)
- Arnobia tinae Tan & Artchawakom, 2014
- Arnobia trichopus Haan, 1842
- Arnobia vietensis Gorochov, 1998
