= Lắk district =

Lắk district Huyện Lắk
- District
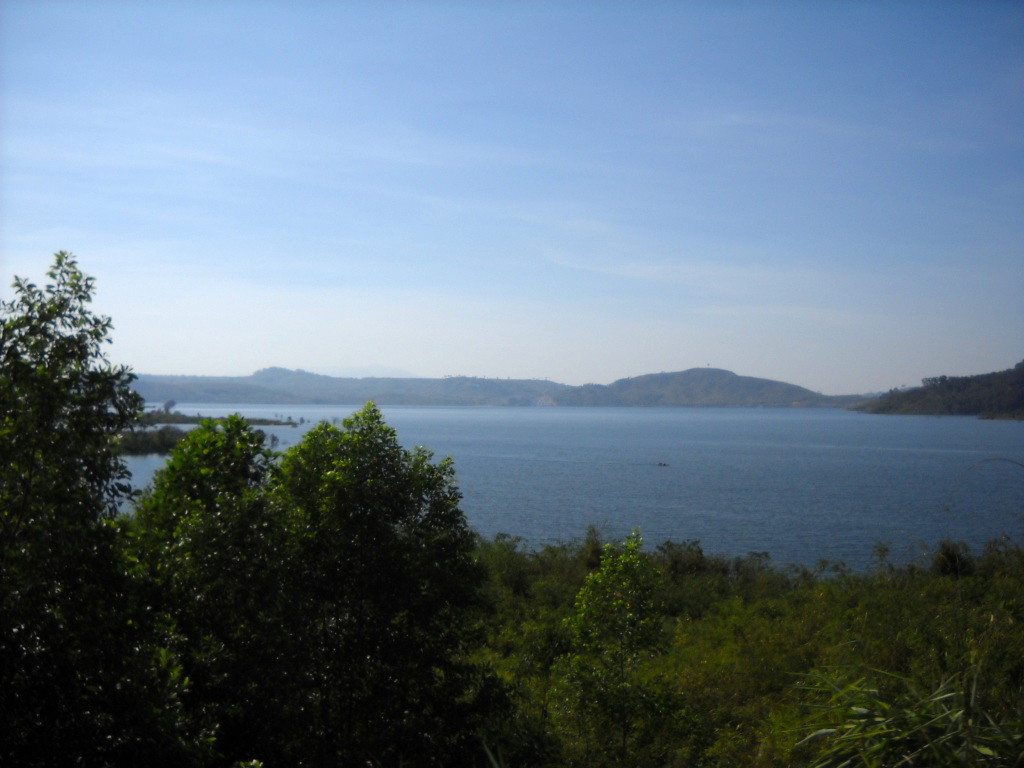
- View of Lắk Lake

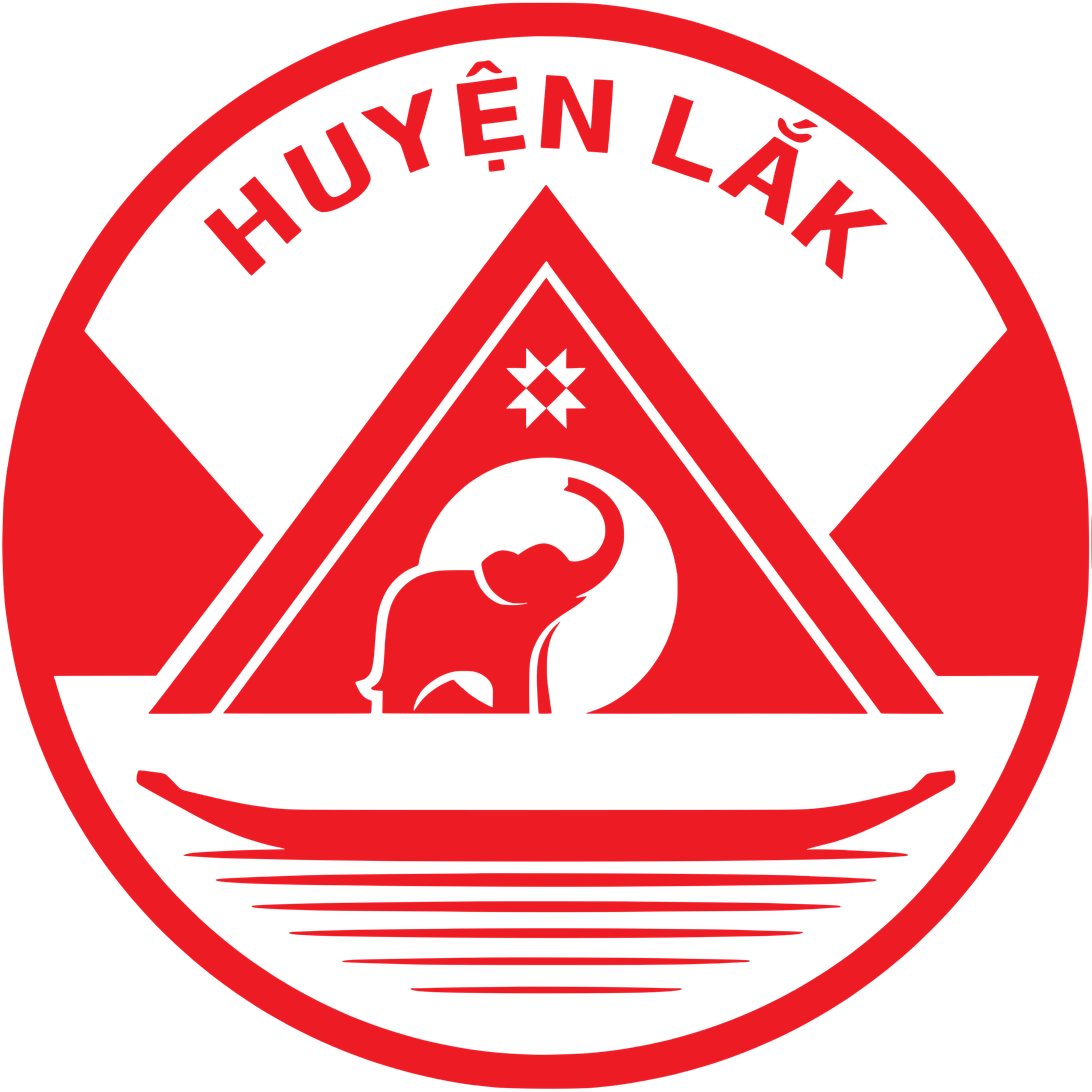
- Seal
- Interactive map of Lắk district
- Country: Vietnam
- Region: Central Highlands
- Province: Đắk Lắk province
- Capital: Liên Sơn

Area
  - Total: 480 sq mi (1,250 km^{2})

Population (2018)
  - Total: 64,644
- Time zone: UTC+7 (Indochina Time)

Lắk is a district (huyện) of Đắk Lắk province in the Central Highlands region of Vietnam.

As of 2003 the district had a population of 55,870, rising to 64,644 in 2018. The district covers an area of 1,250 km^{2}. The district capital lies at Liên Sơn.
