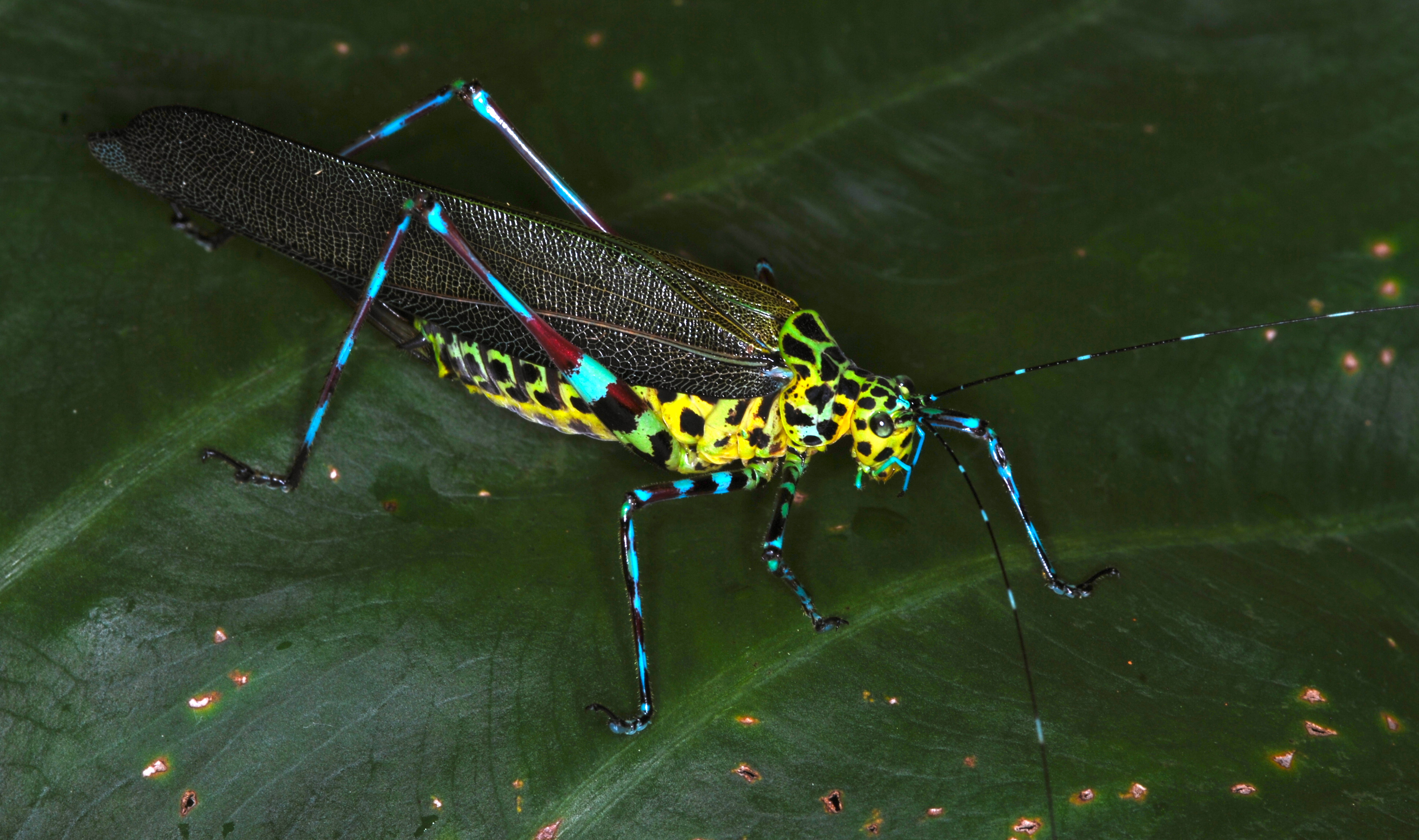

Scientific classification
- Domain: Eukaryota
- Kingdom: Animalia
- Phylum: Arthropoda
- Class: Insecta
- Order: Orthoptera
- Suborder: Ensifera
- Family: Tettigoniidae
- Subfamily: Phaneropterinae
- Tribe: Holochlorini
- Genus: Poecilopsyra; Dohrn, 1892
- Species: P. octoseriata

Binomial name
- Poecilopsyra octoseriata (Haan, 1843)

Synonyms
- Locusta (Phaneroptera) octoseriata Haan, 1843

= Poecilopsyra =

Genus of cricket-like animals

Poecilopsyra is a monotypic genus of katydids or bush crickets native to Malesia. The single (type) species, Poecilopsyra octoseriata, was originally taken from Borneo.
