= Krông Năng =

Krông Năng Xã Krông Năng
- Commune
- Location within Vietnam
- Coordinates: 12°57′7″N 108°20′36″E
- Country: Vietnam
- Region: Central Highlands
- Province: Đắk Lắk
- Time zone: UTC+7 (UTC + 7)

Krông Năng is a commune (xã) of Đắk Lắk Province, Vietnam. It is one of the 102 new wards and communes of the province following the reorganization in 2025.

On June 16, 2025, the Standing Committee of the National Assembly issued Resolution No. 1667/NQ-UBTVQH15 on the arrangement of commune-level administrative units in Đắk Lắk province in 2025. Accordingly, the entire natural area and population of Krông Năng Township, Phú Lộc Commune, and Ea Hồ Commune (formerly in Krông Năng District of Đắk Lắk Province) were merged to form a new commune named Krông Năng Commune.
