= Liên Sơn Lắk =

Liên Sơn Lắk Xã Liên Sơn Lắk
- Commune
- Liên Sơn Lắk commune
- Location within Vietnam
- Coordinates: 12°24′34″N 108°10′27″E
- Country: Vietnam
- Region: Central Highlands
- Province: Đắk Lắk
- Time zone: UTC+7 (UTC + 7)

Liên Sơn Lắk is a commune (xã) of Đắk Lắk Province, Vietnam.

On June 16, 2025, the Standing Committee of the National Assembly issued Resolution No. 1660/NQ-UBTVQH15 on the reorganization of commune-level administrative units in Đắk Lắk Province in 2025 (the resolution took effect on the date of its adoption). Accordingly, the entire natural area and population of Liên Sơn Township, Yang Tao Commune, and Bông Krang Commune were consolidated to establish a new commune named Liên Sơn Lắk Commune.
