= Krông Năng district =

Coordinates: 13.000°N 108.417°E

Krông Năng district Huyện Krông Năng
- District
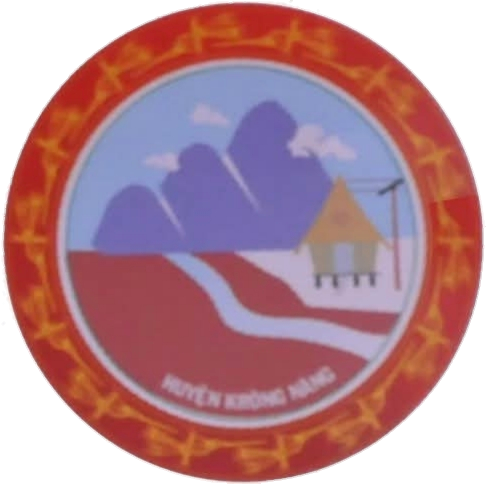
- Seal
- Interactive map of Krông Năng district
- Country: Vietnam
- Region: Central Highlands
- Province: Đắk Lắk province
- Capital: Krông Năng

Population (2018)
  - Total: 124,577
- Time zone: UTC+7 (Indochina Time)

Krông Năng is a former district (huyện) of Đắk Lắk province in the Central Highlands region of Vietnam.

As of 2003 the district had a population of 107,254, rising to 124,577 by 2018. The district covers an area of 620 km². The district capital lies at Krông Năng.
