= Đắk Lắk province =

Province of Vietnam

Đắk Lắk Darlac
- Province
- Tỉnh Đắk Lắk 省得勒
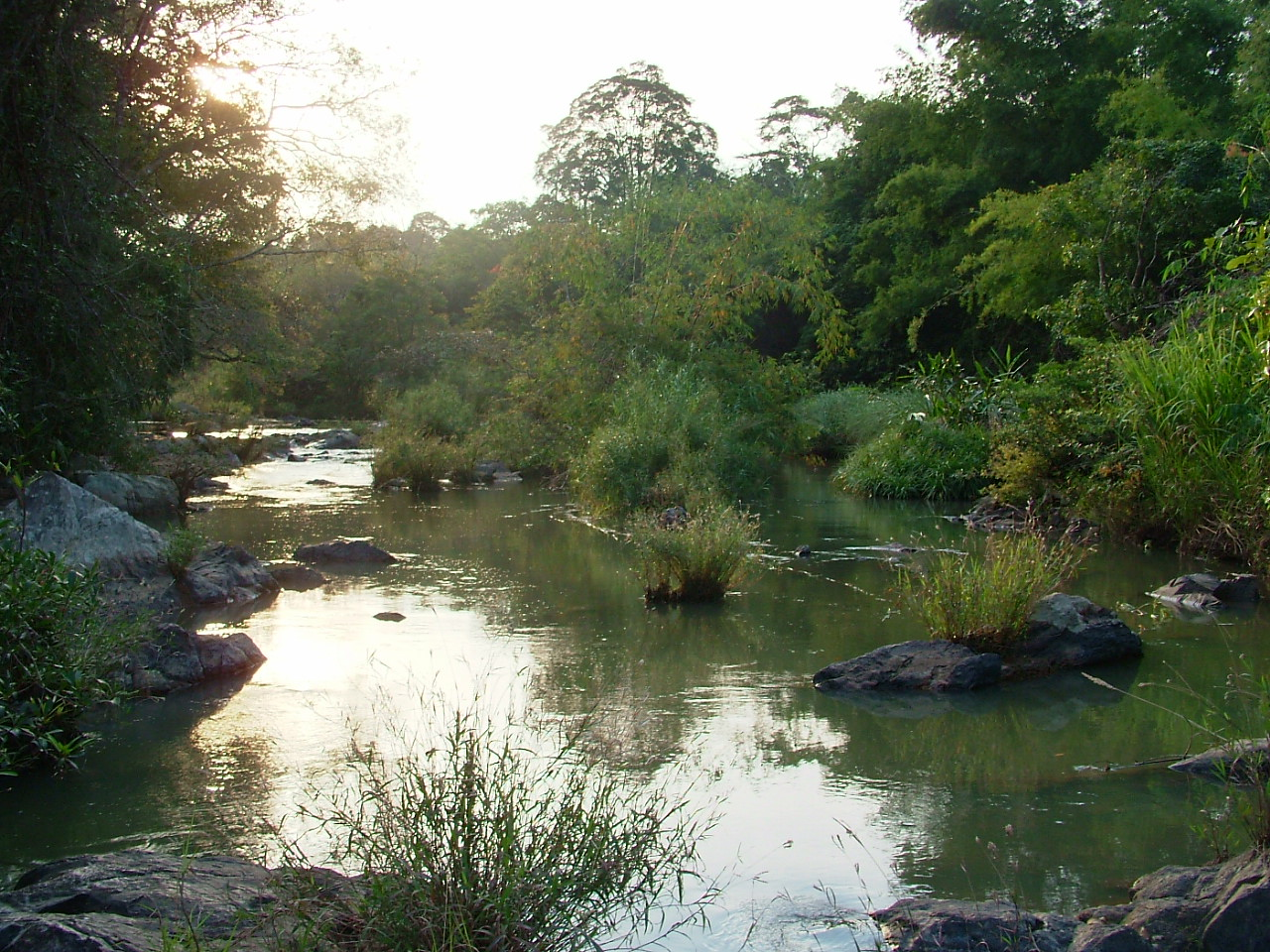
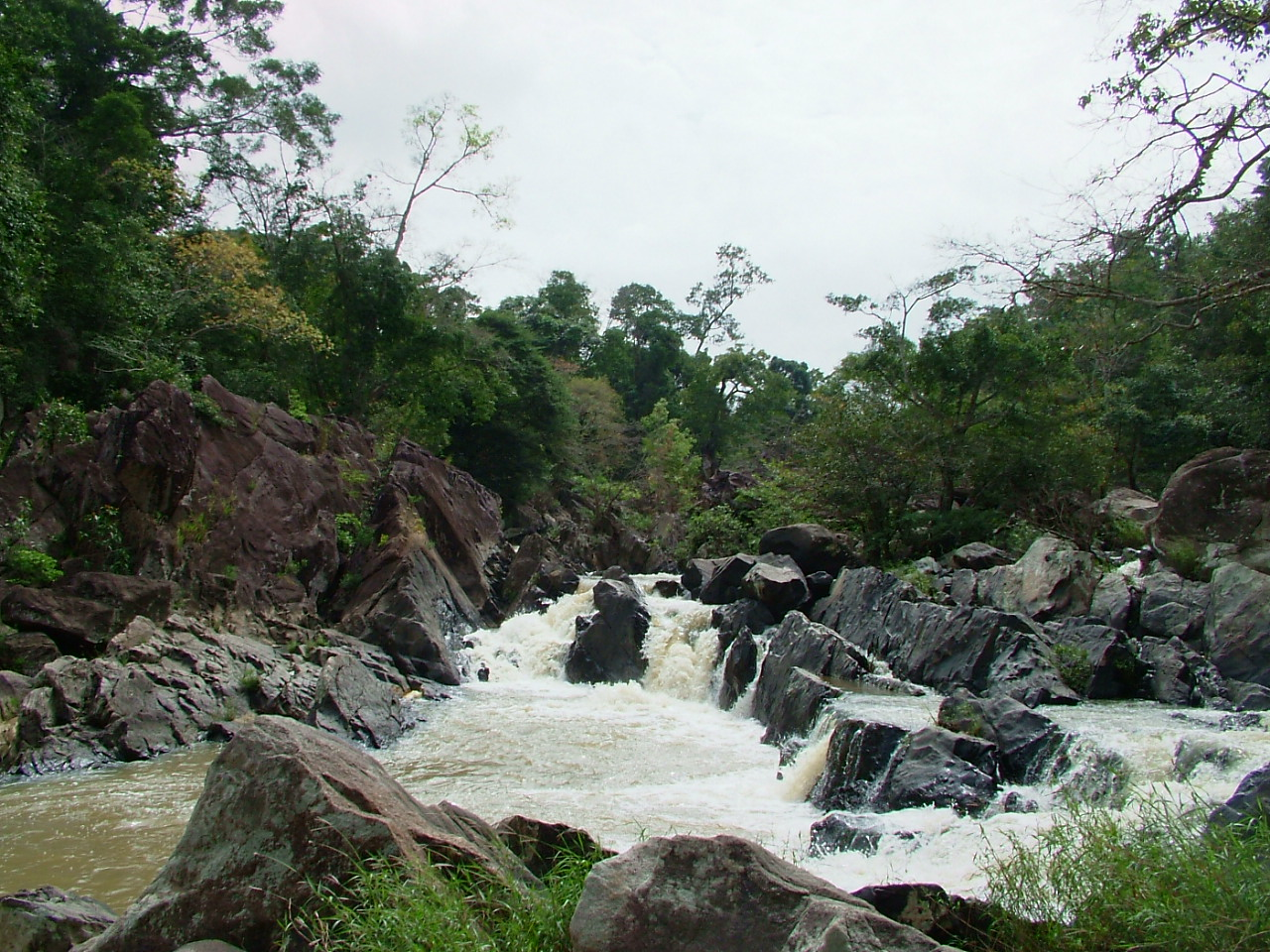
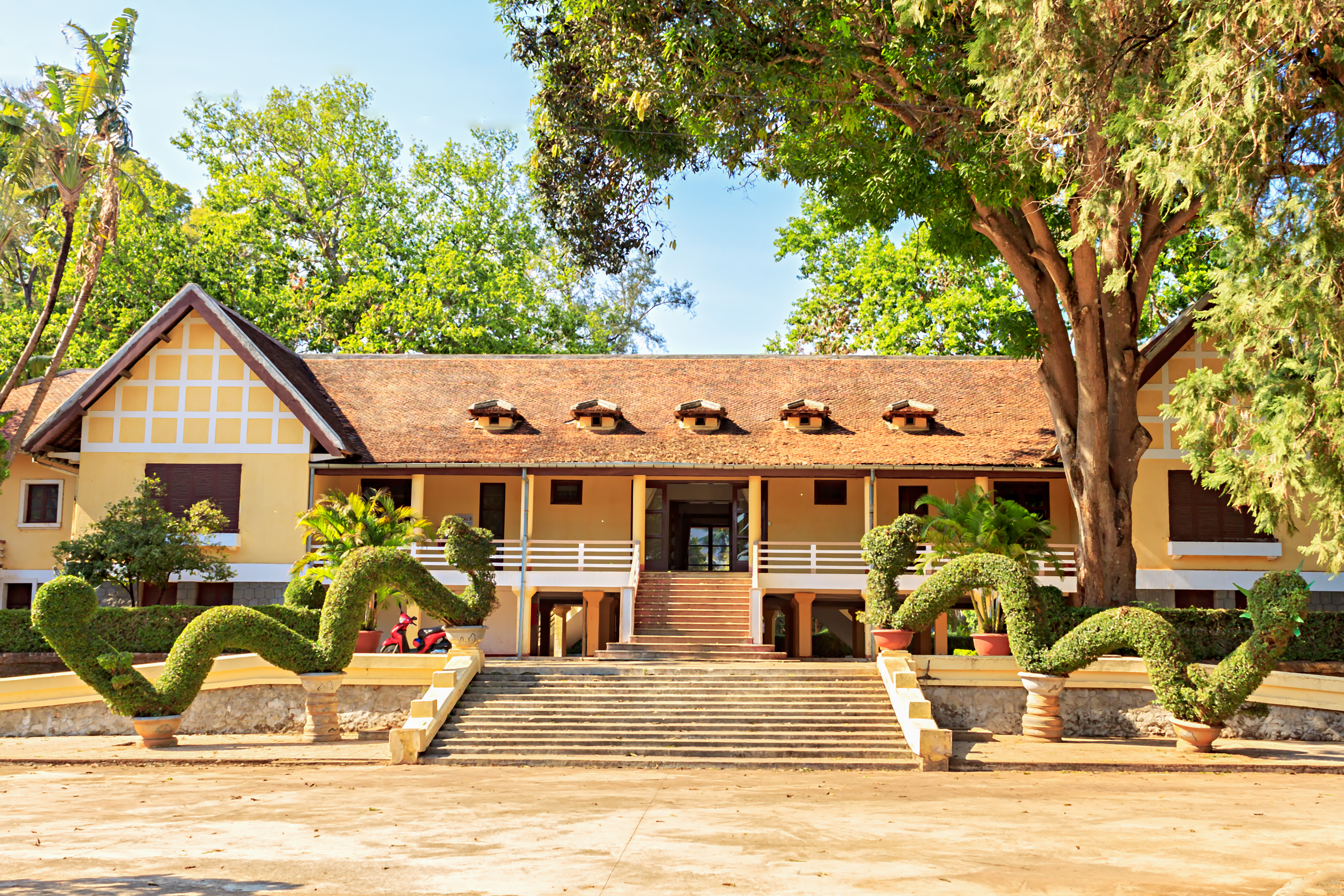
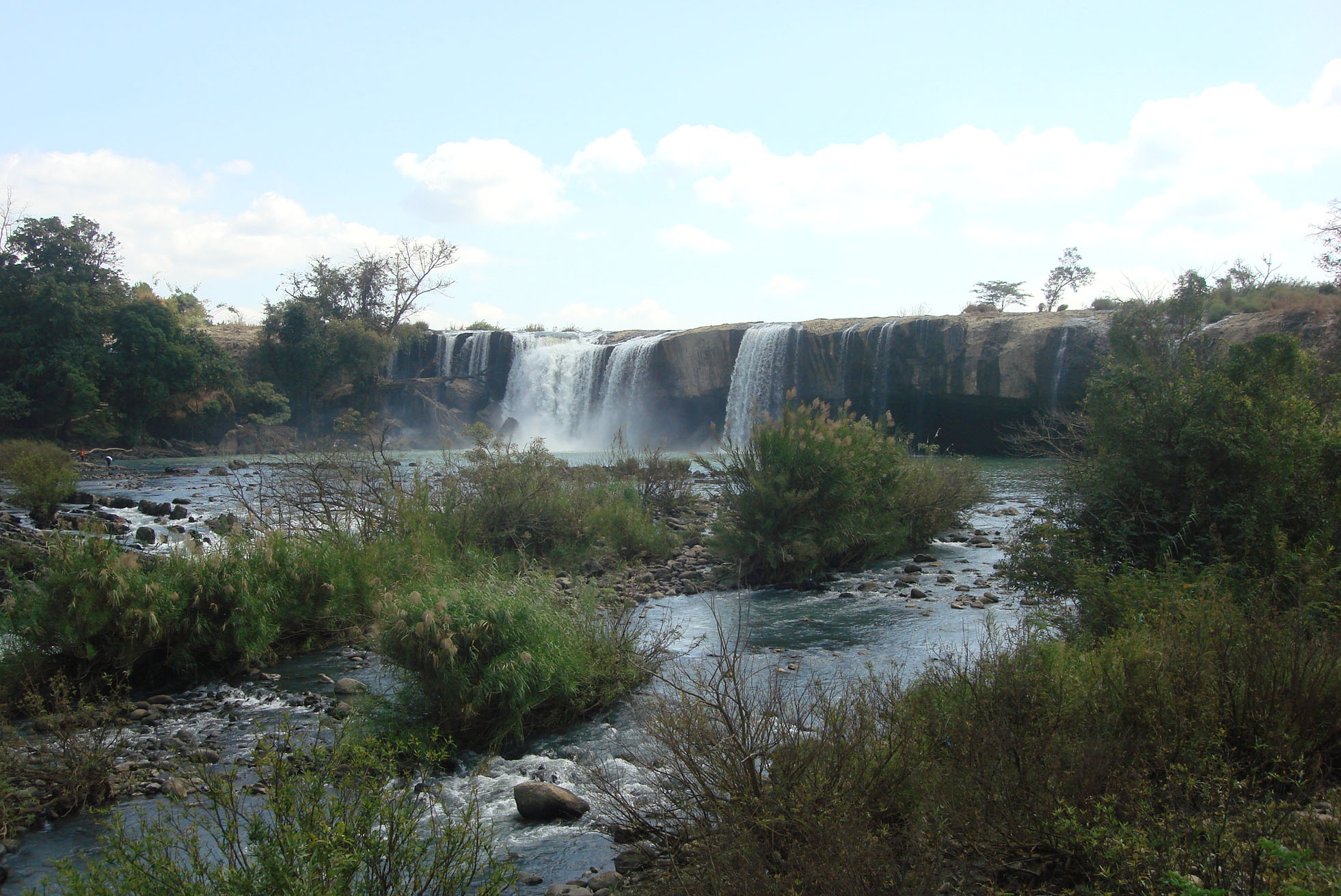
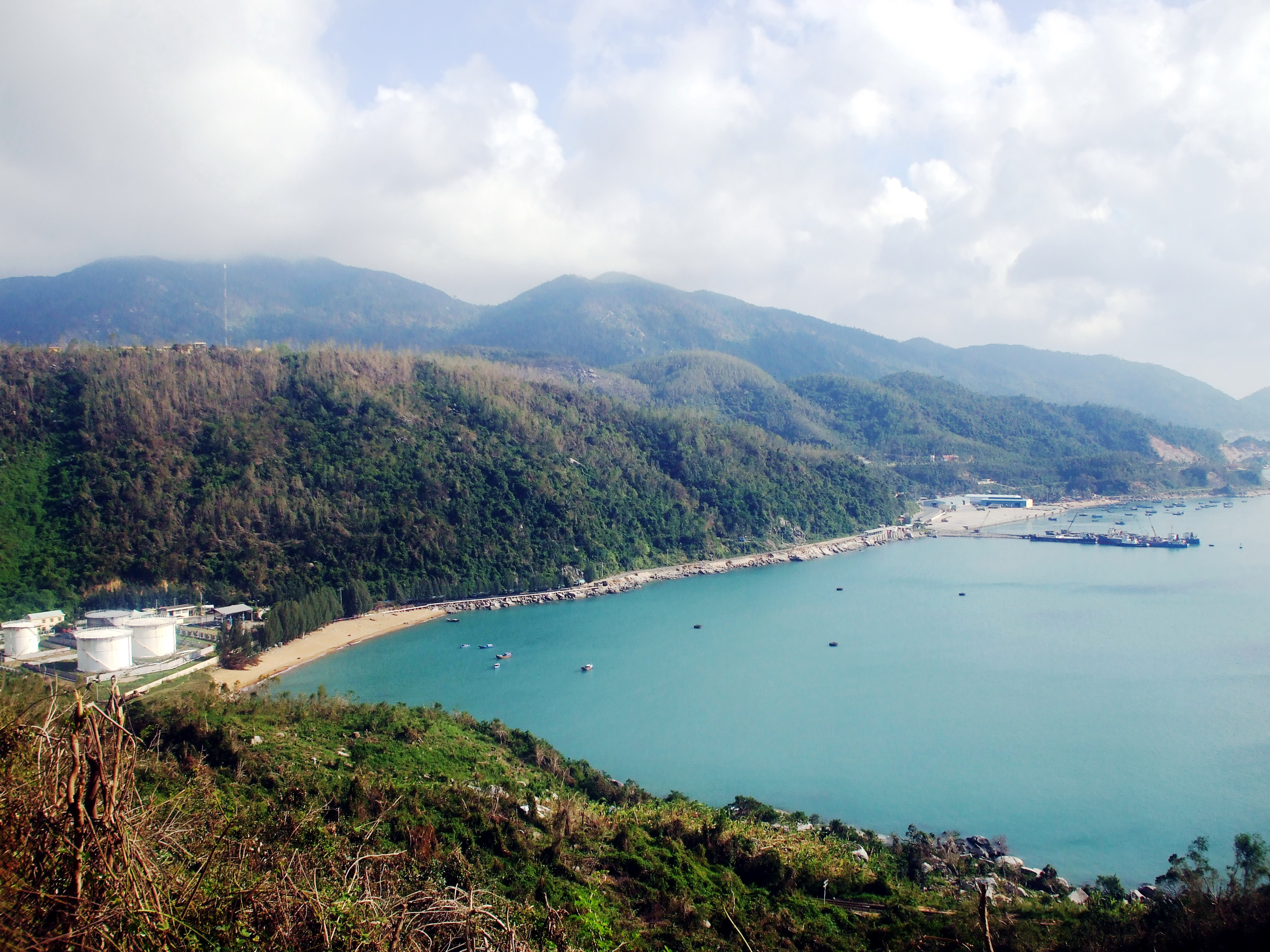
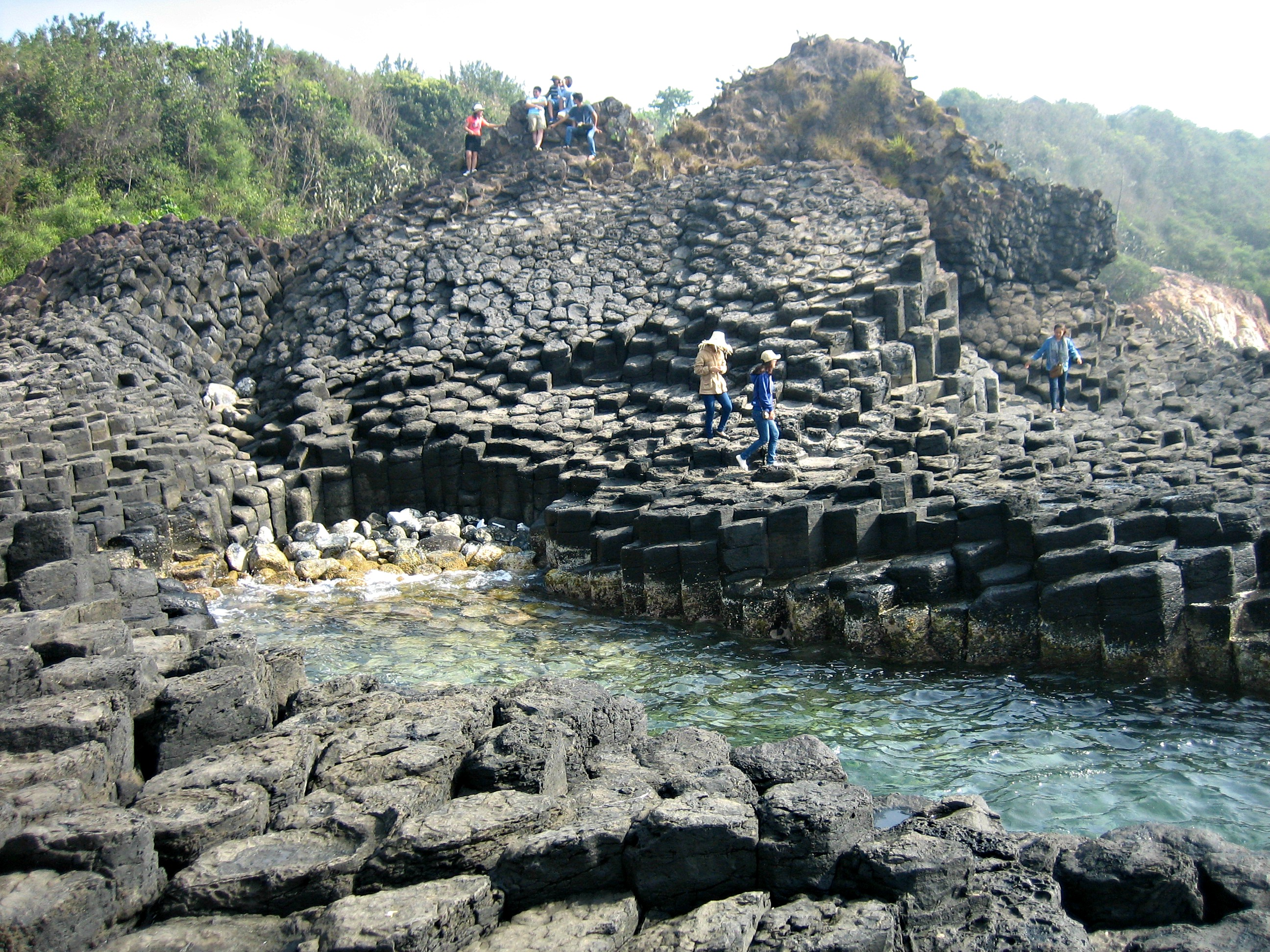
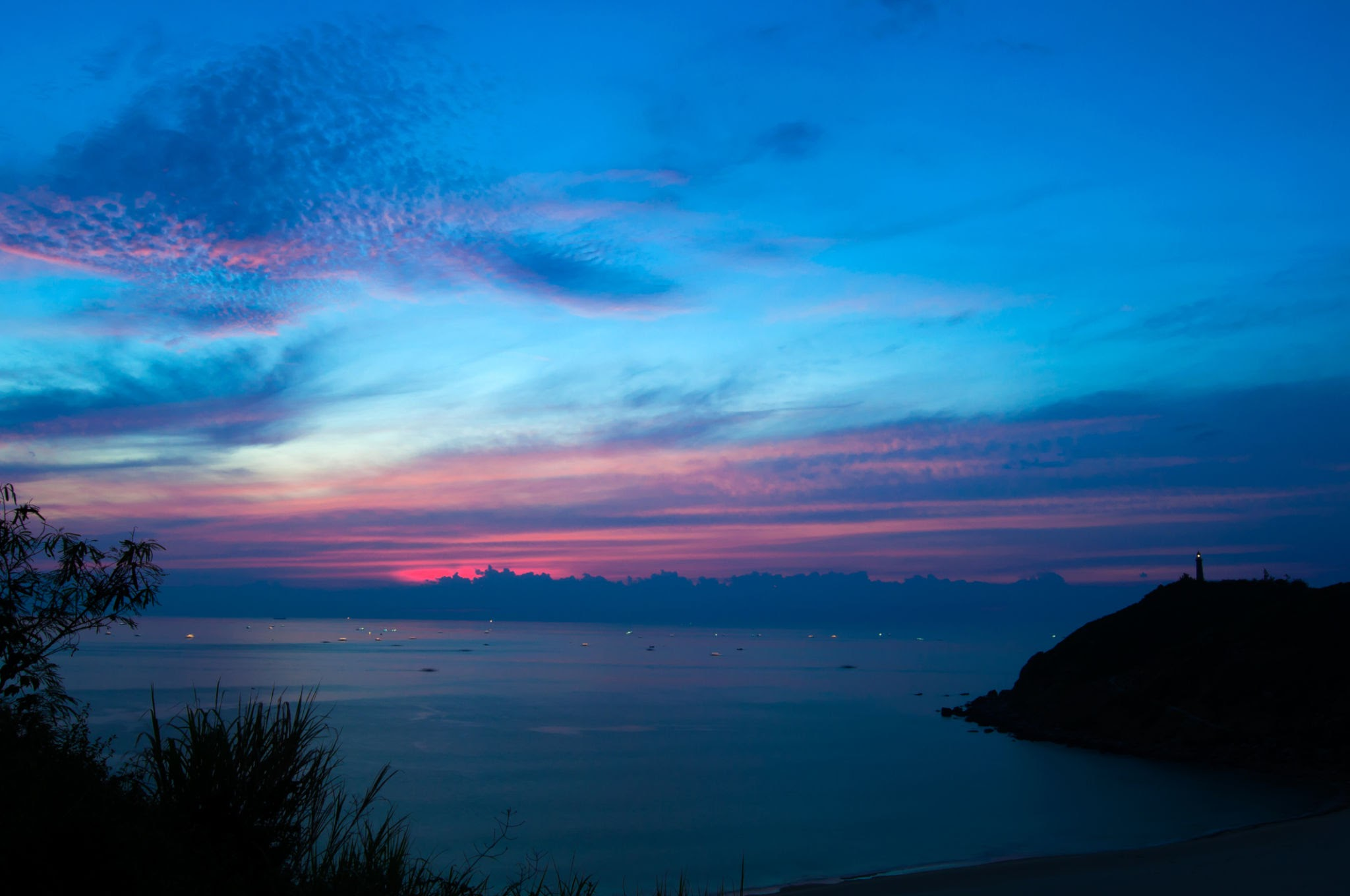
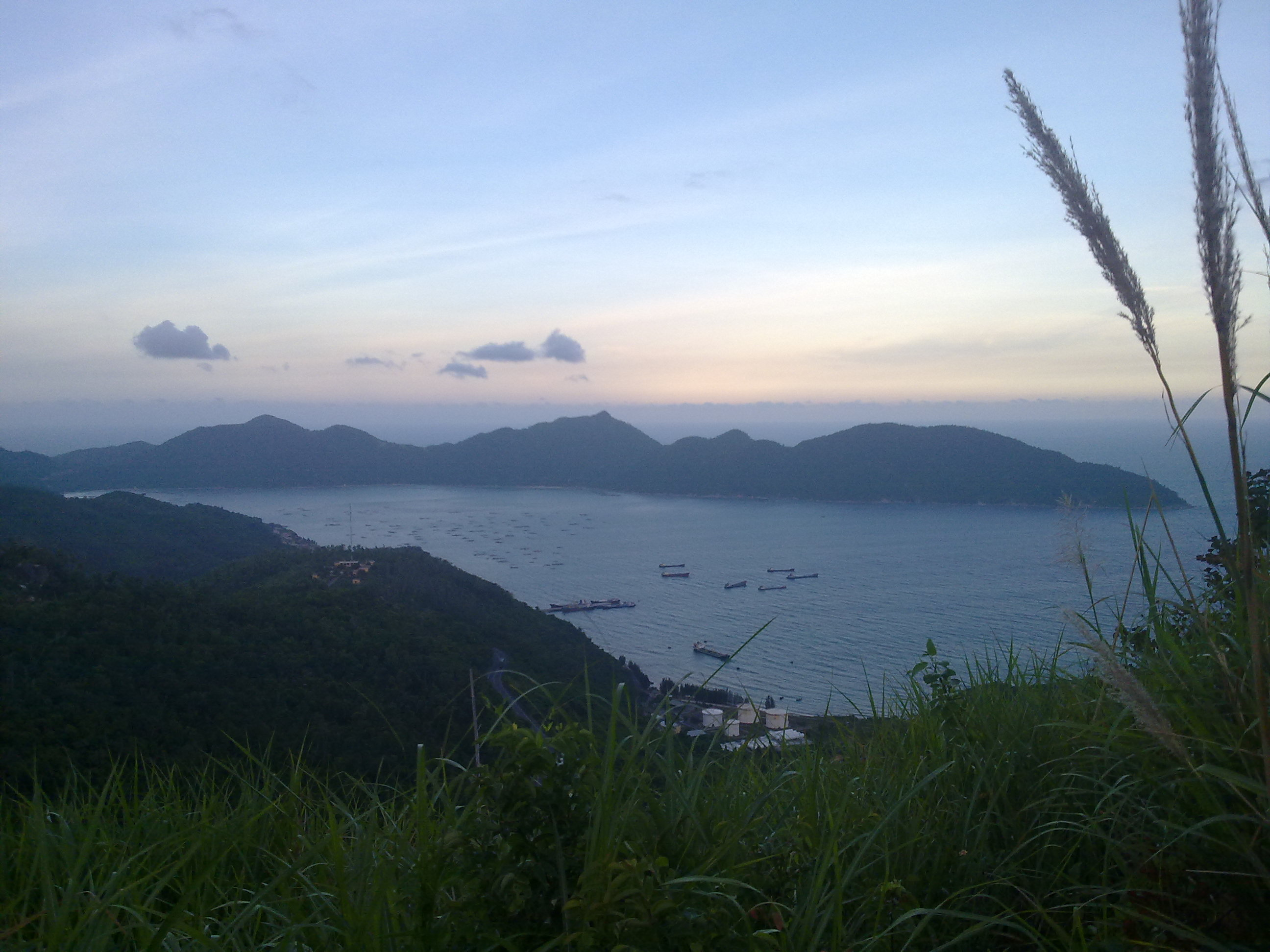
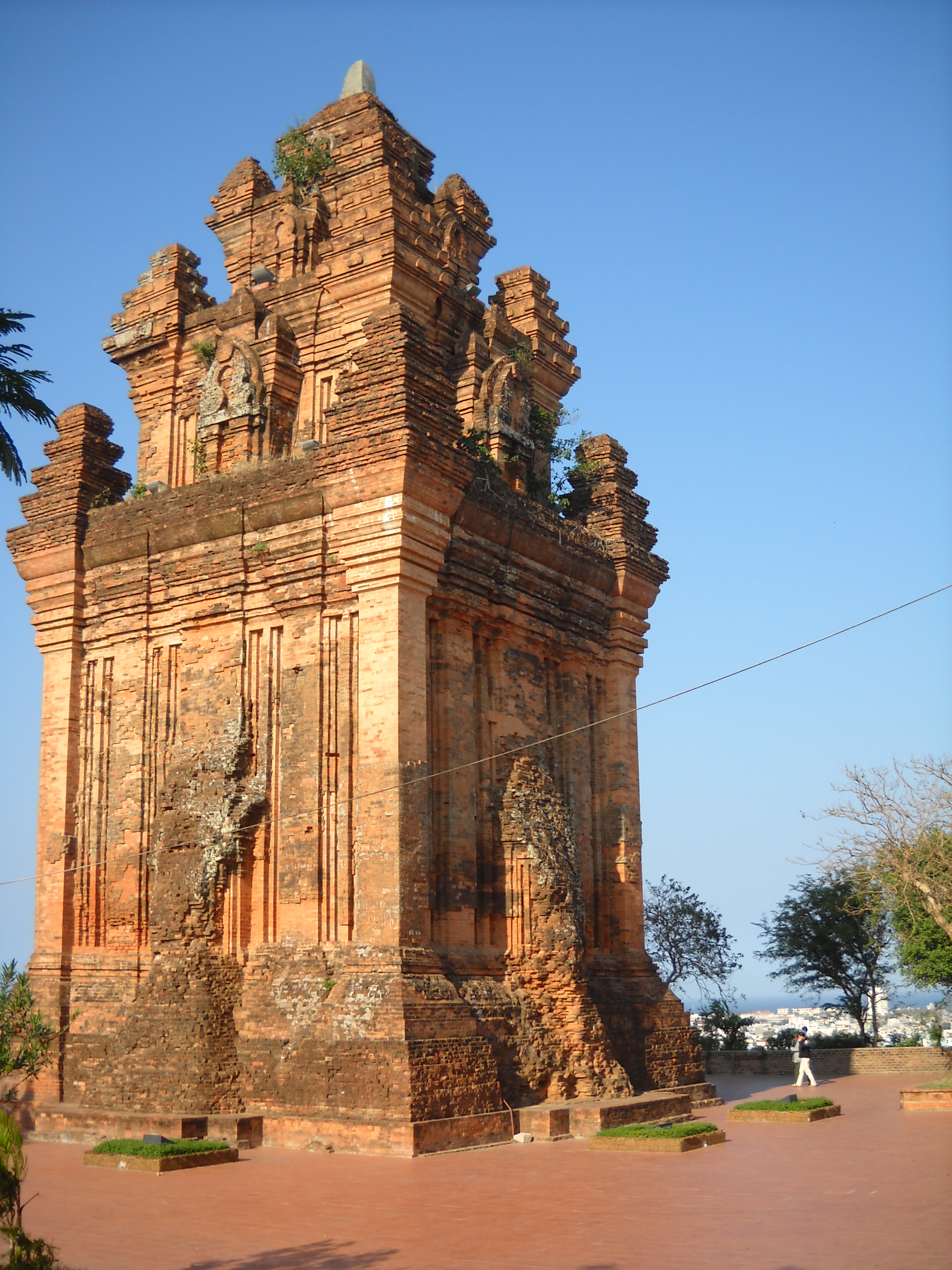
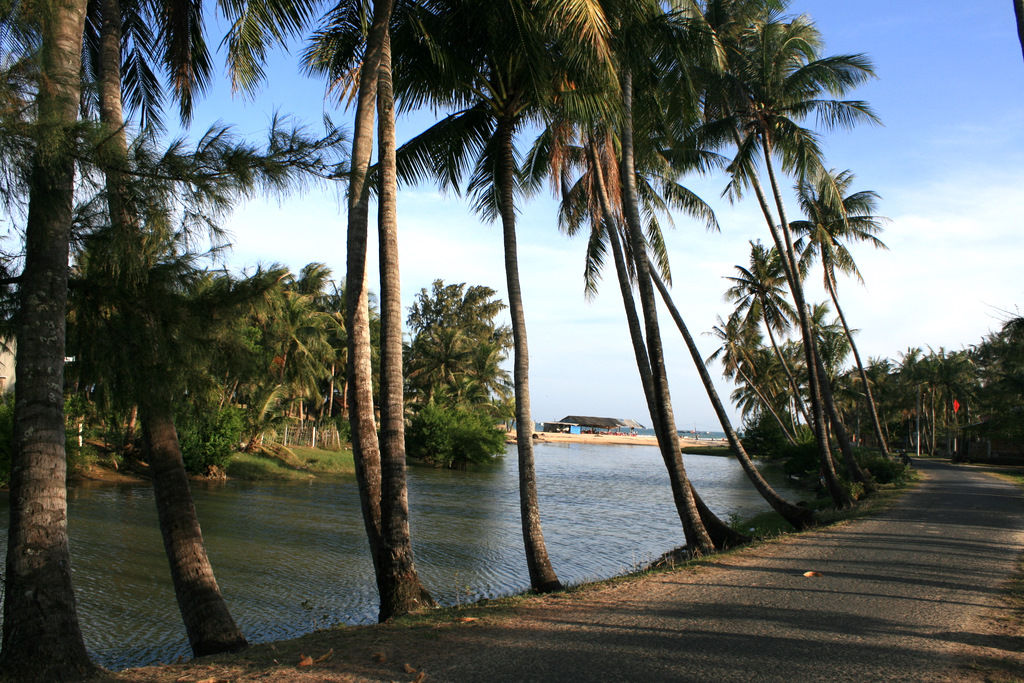
- Ea Sô Forest Stilt house in Bản Đôn Villa of Emperor Bảo Đại Dray Nur Falls Tuy Hòa Beach Đá Dĩa Beach Coral Phú Yên Vũng Rô Bay Nhạn Tower Long Thủy Beach

- Seal

- Location in Vietnam
- Interactive map of Đắk Lắk
- Coordinates: 12°40′N 108°3′E
- Country: Vietnam
- Region: South Central Coast and Central Highlands
- Capital: Buôn Ma Thuột ward

Area
  - Total: 18,096.40 km^{2} (6,987.06 sq mi)

Population (2025)
  - Total: 3,346,853
  - Density: 184.9458/km^{2} (479.0074/sq mi)

Demographics
  - Ethnicities: Vietnamese, Rade, Nùng, Tày, Cham

GDP
  - Total: VND 78.687 trillion US$ 3.418 billion
- Time zone: UTC+7 (ICT)
- Area codes: 262 (from 17 June 2017); 500 (until 16 July 2017)
- ISO 3166 code: VN-33
- HDI (2020): ▲0.682 (52nd)
- Website: www.daklak.gov.vn

Đắk Lắk (Vietnamese pronunciation: [ʔɗǎk lǎk]) is a province in the South Central Coast and Central Highlands region of Vietnam. It borders Gia Lai to the north, East Sea to the east, Khánh Hòa to the southeast, Lâm Đồng to the south and Mondulkiri province of Cambodia to the west. It is home to some indigenous ethnic minorities, such as the Rade, the Jarai and the Mnong, among others.

On June 12, 2025, the National Assembly passed Resolution No. 202/2025/QH15, which took effect the same day, merging Phú Yên province into Đắk Lắk Province.

== Etymology ==
The name comes from the Mnong (a Mon-Khmer language) word dak Lak (/daːk laːk/, which sounds similar to "Đác Lác" in Vietnamese), literally "Lak Lake", referring to the largest freshwater lake in the province. The word dak means "water" or "lake", and is a cognate of the Vietnamese nước/nác ("water"). The official spelling in Vietnamese is Đắk Lắk, with the fact that the original Mnong word contains long "a" sounds rather than short "ă" sounds. Some other spellings such as Dak Lak, Daklak, Đăk Lăk, Đắc Lắc, and Darlac (in older French texts), among others, have also been used. The Daklak Guest House, for example, inconsistently uses Daklak and Đắk Lắk. Linguist Nguyễn Minh Hoạt has argued that a sensible spelling would be Dak Lăk, based on the ground that lak means dermatophytosis in Rade (an unrelated language of the Austronesian family), whilst also citing the Mnong origin as the basis for the dak part of the spelling.

== History ==
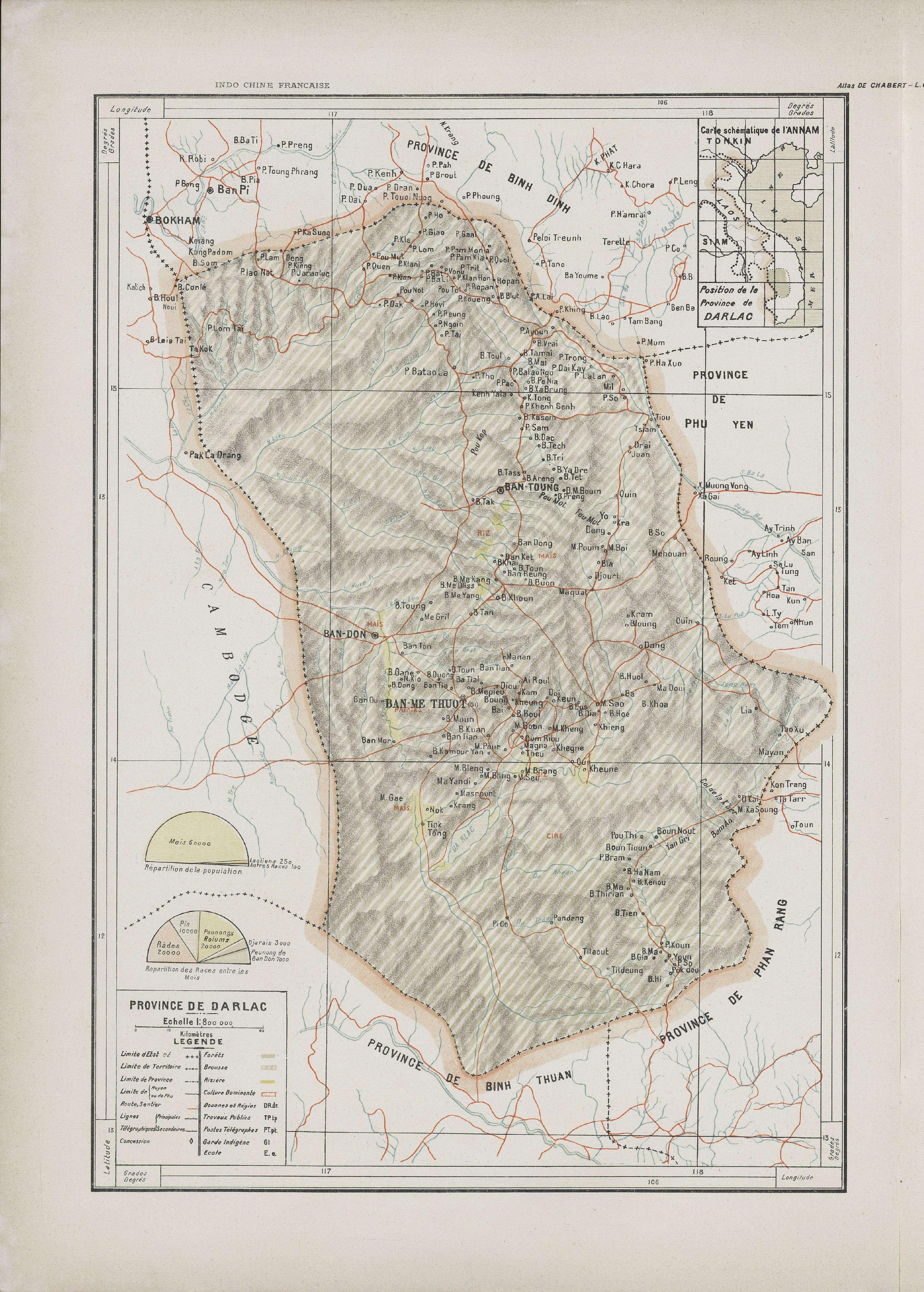
Map of Darlac province in 1909

The area later known as Đắk Lắk was originally controlled by the Kingdom of Champa. When Champa was conquered and annexed by Vietnam in the 15th century, Đắk Lắk was brought under Vietnamese rule. Later, in 1540, a noble named Bùi Tá Hán was appointed by the Vietnamese authorities to direct the settlement of the area by ethnic Vietnamese, bringing the highlands under more effective Vietnamese control. Military outposts were established in the area to guard against possible aggression from the west. Later, when Vietnam was occupied by the French, the French established plantations in the area. There is resistance to French rule in Đắk Lắk, with minority tribes leading a number of rebellions, including a 23-year campaign led by N’Trang Lơng, a M’Nông tribal leader. Later, Đắk Lắk was part of South Vietnam, and saw action in the Vietnam War.

Chronology of events

- End of the 19th century: Đắk Lắk belonged to Kon Tum, part of Vietnam
- 22 November 1904: Đắk Lắk province was created and administered by Annam
- 9 February 1913: Đắk Lắk province again part of Kon Tum
- 2 July 1923: a new Đắk Lắk was formed. It only had villages.
- 1931: it consisted of 5 provinces: Buôn Ma Thuột, Buôn Hồ, Đắk Song, Lak, M'Đrăk
- 2 July 1958: Đắk Lắk (Darlac) is composed of Buôn Ma Thuột, Lạc Thiện, M'Đrăk, Đắk Song, Buôn Hồ
- 23 January 1959: Quảng Đức province was created with the separation of Đăk Song. Part of M'Đrăk district was added to Khánh Hòa Province
- 20 December 1963: Phước An District was formed, with the capital at Phước Trạch, then later to Thuận Hiếu on 1 September 1965.
- 1976: new Đắk Lắk was formed from Đắk Lắk and Quảng Đức.
- 26 November 2003: Đắk Lắk was dissolved again into Đắk Lắk and Đắk Nông.

== Topography ==
Đắk Lắk is based around the Đắk Lắk Plateau, around six hundred metres above sea level. About 60 km south of Buôn Ma Thuột is Lak Lake. Overlooking the lake is the old summer residence of Emperor Bảo Đại which has been renovated into a hotel. Surrounding the lake is Jun Village, home of the Jun people. The villagers use a form of fishing involving the attachment of metal rods to a car battery, running the rods through the water, stunning the fish, and then collecting them to keep in a tank at the village until they are needed.

== Economy ==
Lak Lake, in the M’Nông village of Buôn Jun

Coffee, fruit, and rubber play a part in its economy. There have been efforts to harness the province's potential for hydroelectric generation. The Jun people take advantage of the tourist trade that passes through, giving elephant rides through the village and across the lake.

== Transport ==
Air travel for the province is served by Buon Ma Thuot Airport and Tuy Hoa Airport which both provide direct daily domestic flights to Ha Noi and Ho Chi Minh City operated by Vietnam Airlines, VietJet Air, Pacific Airlines and Bamboo Airways.

== Administrative divisions ==
List of wards and communes in Đắk Lắk province

name	land area	population
Bình Kiến (ward)	73.71	44,406
Buôn Hồ (ward)	66.54	62,780
Buôn Ma Thuột (ward)	71.99	169,596
Cư Bao (ward)	104.94	36,911
Đông Hòa (ward)	77.54	47,632
Ea Kao (ward)	60.70	57,070
Hòa Hiệp (ward)	40.81	53,597
Phú Yên (ward)	44.04	61,799
Sông Cầu (ward)	90.49	38,891
Tân An (ward)	56.41	64,122
Tân Lập (ward)	46.70	73,316
Thành Nhất (ward)	32.22	52,466
Tuy Hòa (ward)	33.77	126,118
Xuân Đài (ward)	13.40	21,574
Buôn Đôn	1,113.79	6,582
Cuôr Đăng	102.84	28,804
Cư M’gar	114.98	32,368
Cư M’ta	261.06	13,592
Cư Pơng	137.81	17,687
Cư Prao	204.89	13,765
Cư Pui	314.08	27,561
Cư Yang	149.43	16,682
Dang Kang	105.91	21,301
Dliê Ya	179.73	46,569
Dray Bhăng	101.37	39,801
Dur Kmăl	114.49	12,594
Đắk Liêng	135.55	22,881
Đắk Phơi	266.83	14,726
Đồng Xuân	206.26	26,907
Đức Bình	160.36	15,896
Ea Bá	131.79	8,316
Ea Bung	390.08	9,677
Ea Drăng	171.34	54,475
Ea Drông	111.13	23,951

name	land area	population
Ea Hiao	361.69	30,796
Ea H’leo	340.06	16,235
Ea Kar	198.67	87,972
Ea Khăl	247.05	29,956
Ea Kiết	201.83	20,177
Ea Kly	107.63	40,161
Ea Knốp	448.65	37,016
Ea Knuếc	122.39	43,748
Ea Ktur	100.72	54,269
Ea Ly	140.35	12,104
Ea M’Droh	134	33,268
Ea Na	134.18	42,164
Ea Ning	86.21	34,175
Ea Nuôl	111.74	43,706
Ea Ô	137.73	23,852
Ea Păl	102.52	15,049
Ea Phê	84.66	48,605
Ea Riêng	167.56	15,719
Ea Rốk	544.60	28,785
Ea Súp	418.72	30,762
Ea Trang	207.40	6,585
Ea Tul	159.51	34,876
Ea Wer	184.61	29,708
Ea Wy	213.94	28,567
Hòa Mỹ	190.14	26,530
Hòa Phú	109.07	48,822
Hòa Sơn	108.55	25,392
Hòa Thịnh	159.23	30,602
Hòa Xuân	129.33	22,962
Ia Lốp	194.09	6,502
Ia Rvê	217.83	6,847
Krông Á	291.60	12,900
Krông Ana	107.23	48,491
Krông Bông	166.03	23,168

name	land area	population
Krông Búk	134.83	30,822
Krông Năng	98.34	43,678
Krông Nô	282.01	10,301
Krông Pắc	112.52	68,682
Liên Sơn Lắk	398.82	26,772
M’Drắk	151.87	22,808
Nam Ka	172.86	6,424
Ô Loan	103.48	40,278
Phú Hòa 1	142.54	54,212
Phú Hòa 2	95.78	38,691
Phú Mỡ	547.20	9,007
Phú Xuân	140.74	34,836
Pơng Drang	85.03	30,208
Quảng Phú	111.34	61,104
Sông Hinh	460.13	23,841
Sơn Hòa	267.39	40,825
Sơn Thành	218.11	27,838
Suối Trai	186.95	11,387
Tam Giang	195.80	25,470
Tân Tiến	89.43	28,767
Tây Hòa	55.14	49,720
Tây Sơn	334.62	11,052
Tuy An Bắc	52.32	26,174
Tuy An Đông	46.05	40,108
Tuy An Nam	69.99	29,805
Tuy An Tây	136.20	12,913
Vân Hòa	151.47	6,661
Vụ Bổn	109.13	18,111
Xuân Cảnh	83.81	23,972
Xuân Lãnh	174.65	15,933
Xuân Lộc	114.01	27,609
Xuân Phước	102.81	16,197
Xuân Thọ	192.12	10,793
Yang Mao	562.38	16,970
