= Montagnard (Vietnam) =

Indigenous people of the Central Highlands of Vietnam

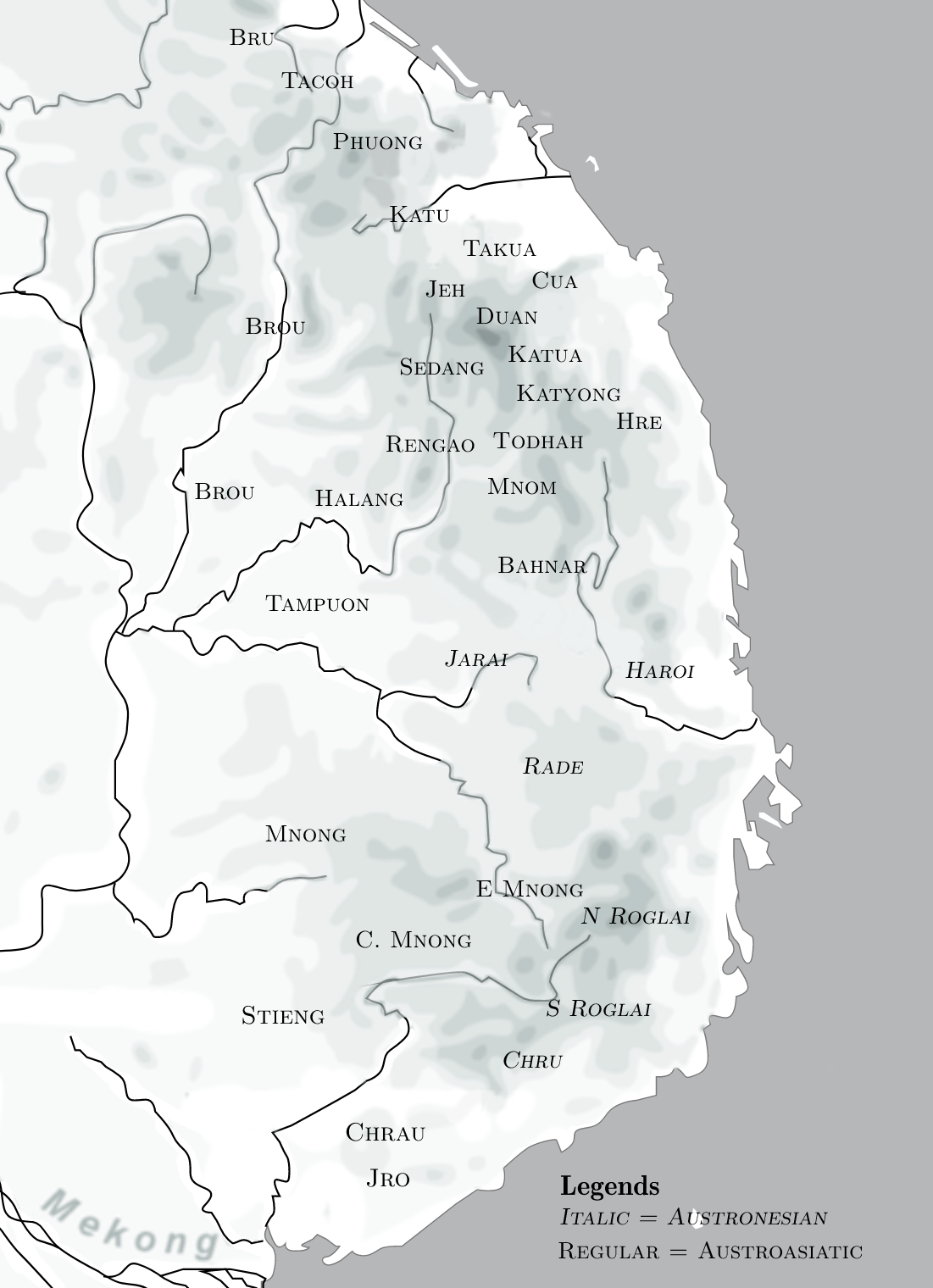
Distribution of ethno-linguistic groups in the Central Highlands of Vietnam

Montagnard (/ˌmɒn.tənˈjɑːrd/, MON-tən-YARD) is an umbrella term for the various indigenous peoples of the Central Highlands of Vietnam. The French term Montagnard ([mɔ̃.ta.ɲaʁ]) signifies a mountain dweller, and is a carryover from the French colonial period in Vietnam. In Vietnamese, they are known as người Thượng (lit. 'highlanders'), although this term can also be applied to other minority ethnic groups in Vietnam. In modern Vietnam, both terms are archaic, and indigenous ethnic groups are referred to as đồng bào Tây Nguyên (lit. 'Central Highlands compatriots') or dân tộc thiểu số Tây Nguyên (lit. 'Central Highlands minorities'). Earlier they were referred to pejoratively as mọi. Sometimes the term Degar (Đềga) is used for the group as well. Most of those living in the United States refer to themselves as Montagnards, while those living in Vietnam refer to themselves by their individual ethnic group.

The Montagnards are most covered in English-language scholarship for their participation in the Vietnam War, when they were heavily recruited by the Army of the Republic of Vietnam and its American and Australian allies. Today, the Montagnards tend to be Christian in a higher proportion than the Kinh Vietnamese, while the Vietnamese government is often perceived as advancing a heavily centralized state that persecutes Montagnard local priorities and religious practices.

== Ethnic groups ==
Below is a list of officially recognized ethnic groups in Vietnam that are indigenous to the Central Highlands and nearby areas, with a total population of approximately 2.25 million. They speak Austroasiatic languages of the Katuic and Bahnaric branches, as well as Chamic languages (which belong to the Austronesian language family). Population statistics are from the 2009 Vietnam Population Census.

- Katuic speakers:
  - Bru (2019 population: 94,598): Quảng Trị province
  - Katu (2019 population: 74,173): Quảng Nam province
  - Tà Ôi (2019 population: 52,356): Thừa Thiên-Huế province and Quảng Trị province
- Bahnaric speakers:
  - West Bahnaric
    - Brau (2019 population: 525): Kon Tum province
  - East Bahnaric
    - Cor (2019 population: 40,442): Quảng Ngãi province
  - North Bahnaric
    - Xo Dang (2019 population: 212,277): Kon Tum province and Quảng Nam province
    - H're (2019 population: 149,460): Quảng Ngãi province
    - Rơ Măm (2019 population: 639): Kon Tum province
  - Central Bahnaric
    - Bahnar (2019 population: 286,910): Gia Lai province and Kon Tum province
    - Jeh-Tariang (2019 population: 63,322): Kon Tum province and Quảng Nam province
  - South Bahnaric
    - Cho Ro (2019 population: 29,520): Đồng Nai province
    - Koho (2019 population: 203,800): Lâm Đồng province
    - Mạ (2019 population: 50,322): Lâm Đồng province
    - Stieng (2019 population: 85,436): Bình Phước province
    - Mnong (2019 population: 100,752): Đắk Lắk province and Đắk Nông province
- Chamic speakers:
  - Chams (2019 population: 178,948): Ninh Thuận province and Bình Thuận province
  - Churu (2019 population: 23,242): Lâm Đồng province
  - Rade or Êđê (2019 population: 398,671): Đắk Lắk province
  - Jarai (2019 population: 513,930): Gia Lai province
  - Raglai (2019 population: 146,613): Ninh Thuận province and Khánh Hòa province

Listed by province, from north to south as well as west to east:

- Quảng Trị province: Bru (Katuic), Ta Oi (Katuic)
- Thừa Thiên-Huế province: Ta Oi (Katuic)
- Quảng Nam province: Katu (Katuic), Xo Dang (North Bahnaric), Jeh-Tariang (Central Bahnaric)
- Quảng Ngãi province: H're (North Bahnaric), Cor (East Bahnaric)
- Kon Tum Province: Jeh-Tariang (Central Bahnaric), Bahnar (Central Bahnaric), Xo Dang (North Bahnaric), Rơ Măm (North Bahnaric), Brau (West Bahnaric)
- Gia Lai province: Jarai (Chamic), Bahnar (Central Bahnaric)
- Đắk Lắk province: Rade (Chamic), Mnong (South Bahnaric)
- Khánh Hòa province: Raglai (Chamic)
- Đắk Nông province: Mnong (South Bahnaric)
- Lâm Đồng province: Churu (Chamic), Mạ (South Bahnaric), Ko Ho (South Bahnaric)
- Ninh Thuận province: Raglai (Chamic), Chams (Chamic)
- Bình Phước province: Stieng (South Bahnaric)
- Đồng Nai province: Cho Ro (South Bahnaric)
- Bình Thuận province: Chams (Chamic)

== History ==
A Montagnard tribesman during training in 1962

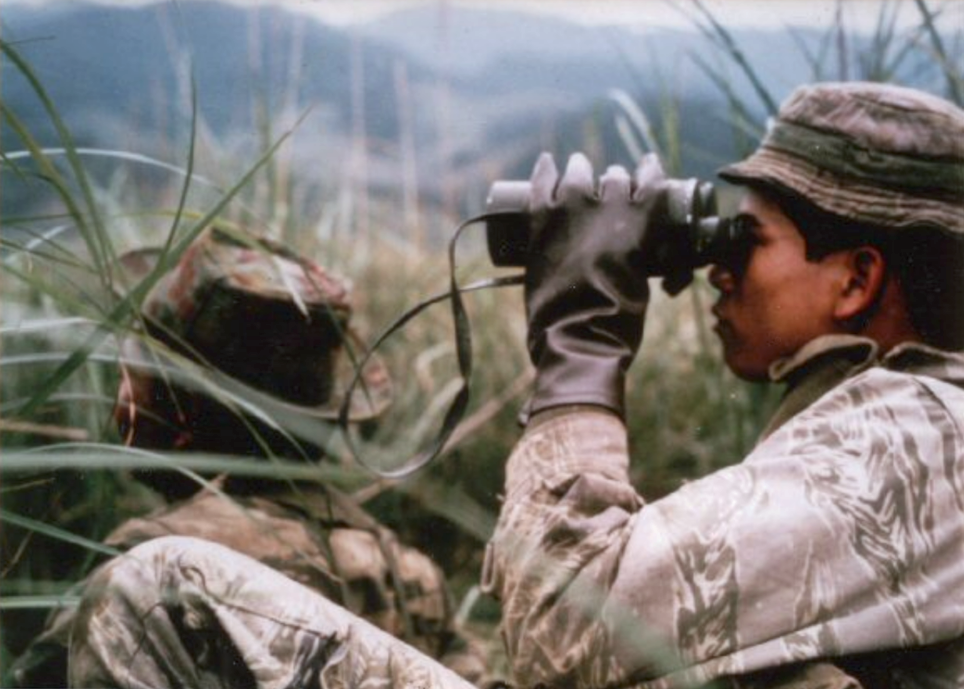
Two Montagnard soldiers in the 1st Cavalry Division carrying out a long-range reconnaissance patrol and scanning for North Vietnamese forces, March 1968

=== Pre-colonial history ===
In 1962, the population of the Montagnard people in the Central Highlands was estimated to number as many as one million. Today, the population is approximately four million, of whom about one million are Montagnards. The 30 or so Montagnard tribes in the Central Highlands comprise more than nineteen different ethnic groups who speak languages drawn primarily from the Malayo-Polynesian, Tai, and Austroasiatic language families. The main tribes, in order of population, are the Jarai, Rade, Bahnar, Koho, Mnong, and Stieng.

According to a genetic survey conducted in 2019 by Macholdt et al., the two largest Montagnards groups, the Jarai, Rade, are genetically distinct from the mainstream Vietnamese ethnic groups. According to Y chromosome analyses on Jarai and Rade individuals, their paternal ancestors were a dark-skinned and woolly hair people related to Andamanese peoples. Mitochondrial analyses revealed their maternal ancestry mainly descended from a group of Polynesians who arrived much later. This study underlines the genetic diversity within the Central Highlands' native population.

Ancient Chinese chronicles like the Book of Jin recorded that the West of Linyi (Champa) were inhabited by numerous tribes who were described as "savages." According to the Jin dynasty annalists, in the 4th century CE the King of Lâm Ấp, Fan Wen, went to subdue and incorporated the tribes of Daqijie, Xiaoqijie, Ship, Xulang, Qudu, Ganlu, and Fudan in the Central Highlands into Champa's territory.

The Old Book of Tang notes that the people of Champa have "black skin, eyes deep in the orbit, short stature, broad nose, and frizzy hair."

Surrounded by Indianized and Sinicized states from all sides, the Montagnard tribes however have preserved their distinct cultures dating back to the prehistoric era, thanks to the high mountains. The Montagnard region was known by the Vietnamese as Rung Moi (Forest of the Savages).

The Montagnards have a history of tensions with the Vietnamese majority since the 19th century. While the Vietnamese or Kinh majority have a common language and culture and have developed and maintained the dominant social institutions of Vietnam, the Montagnard do not share that heritage. The Montagnards retain their tribal customs and ancestral land ownership. Unlike the Buddhist Vietnamese who are patriarchal, the Montagnards mainly practice traditional matrilineality, such as the Jarai and Rade, where head of the house is passed down from the mother to the oldest daughter, and women take charge of the leadership in tribal communities. There have been conflicts between the two groups over many issues, including land ownership, language and cultural preservation, access to education and resources, and political representation.

The Vietnamese defeated the Chams in 1471 and occupied former Champa. As anticipated, Vietnamese rulers established numerous military colonies, đôn điên, for Kinh settlers. However, they did not venture deep into the Highlands unlike the Chams, and there were no attempts to colonize the Highlands. But in 1802, the emperor of Vietnam, Gia Long, planned to pacify the Montagnard tribes. Several tribes and chiefdoms accepted tributary status under nominal Vietnamese overlord. Vietnamese privileged traders known as các lái were prominently active in the highland commodities trade involving Western merchants. Under Emperor Tu Duc, in 1863 a Son Phòng (mountain defense) program was laid out to prevent Hre tribal revolt as well as to collect taxes from friendly Montagnard tribes. The Son Phong program was dismantled by the French in 1898, as it had become outdated and corrupted.

Contacts between the Montagnards and Westerners started in the sixteenth century with Portuguese missionaries, followed by Dutch traders and French missionaries. European Jesuits such as Christoforo Borri reported tribes known as kemois (barbarians) dwelling in the mountainous areas of Cochinchina not yet subjected to the king. A French missionary, Père Gagelin, made the first direct contact with the tribes in 1830. In 1841, the bishop of Quy Nhon diocese, Mgr. Cuénot, wrote a short description of the Cham, the Rhade, and the Jarai tribes. In 1848, Vietnamese priest Father Dô was sent to investigate the highland and sought to study the Bahnar language and culture of the Montagnards. Major contacts occurred in the next decades, with a stream of outsiders, mostly Vietnamese Catholics, coming to Kon Tum to escape violence by members of the neo-Confucian extremist Văn Thân movement.

=== Colonial period ===
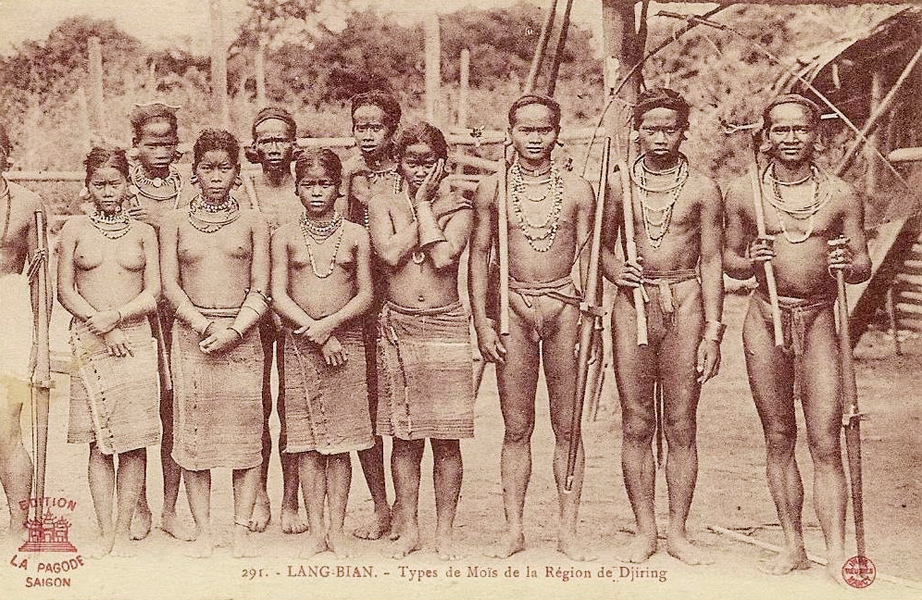
Indigenous Montagnard villagers in Lam Dong in the early 1900s

France conquered Cochinchina in 1862 and conquered Tonkin and Annam in 1883. At that time, the Montagnard lands remained largely unexplored. The French government began to search for backup evidence for their claim over the Montagnard lands by looking into Vietnamese annals and asserted historic Vietnamese suzerainty over the Jarai chiefdoms of p'tau apui and p'tau ia in 1889. The Jarai resisted and defeated the French in 1894, but later were subdued when the French came back in 1897 with more soldiers. In the next two decades, the French government made heavy efforts to secure the highlands and trust from the indigenous peoples. Despite that, the Montagnard tribes fiercely fought back. From 1901 to 1914, four high-ranking French military officers were killed by the Montagnard warriors armed with bows and sticks.

Kontum became a major settlement for Franco–Vietnamese Catholics by 1885. Direct rule over the Highlands began in 1898. The region was administered from a French center in Kontum, and tax collection among the Montagnards began on a regular basis. Missionary activities succeeded in converting the Bahnar tribes to Catholicism, but found difficulty with other tribes such as the Sedang, the Jarai, and the Mnong who refused to accept French colonial rule and industrial encroachment of their village lands. Resistance from the Sedang and Mnong would last as late as 1914. That said, there was more rivalry than cooperation between the Catholic Church and the French colonial administration. The missionary enclave in Kontum often acted with hostility to French government officials in preserving their and the associated converts' privileges, while the French government accused the Catholic missionaries of displacement of non-Christian villages, owning slaves, murders, and dispossession of lands. Disputes between missionaries and colonial officials reached a peak in the 1930s when French state officials openly tried to convert the Montagnards to Buddhism. Several plans were proposed to colonize the highlands. Some believed that the Montagnards should be Christianized but their original culture also should be respected and preserved. Other Social-Darwinists pushed as far as proposing the colonization should be done with a large number of Vietnamese settlers, mainly Catholic, that would eventually outnumber the indigenous tribes and perform the tasks of "civilizing" them. Henri Maitre in his book Les Jungles Moï argued that the black Montagnards would be rapidly disappeared according to Social Darwinist theories which more advanced races like the Vietnamese and the French would gradually replace the Montagnards in their own ancestral lands.

L. Nouet, a French civil official, observed the Montagnards' swidden slash-and-burn style of agriculture and considered it a source of poverty, writing that "the Moi are always hungry." He wrote that he wondered if a French decree of 1875 that prohibited agricultural practices of the rây (shifting cultivation) on the Montagnards was strictly enforced, that the Montagnard might starve and go extinct. Nouet believed that a Vietnamese migration into the Central Highlands would set up a social Darwinist "survival of the fittest" scenario that would be good for both groups.

French missionaries converted some Montagnards to the Catholic Church in the nineteenth century, but American missionaries converted more to Protestantism in the 1920s and 1930s. Of the approximately one million Montagnards, close to half are Protestant, and around 200,000 are Roman Catholic. This made Vietnam's Communist Party suspicious of the Montagnards, particularly during the Vietnam War, since it was thought that they would be more inclined to help the heavily culturally Christian American forces.

The Indochinese Communist Party began to grow concerned about Montagnard autonomy as early as its First National Party Congress held in Macau 1935. The Meeting's resolutions declared that all ethnic groups had the right "to choose between adhering to the Union of Indochinese Soviet Republics and proclaiming itself a separate state. The Soviet government of the workers, peasants and soldiers of Indochina will in no way interfere or create obstacle..."

The colonization of the Central Highlands became stalled in the 1930s due to a combination of many factors, including prolonged indigenous resistances of the Mnong led by N'Trang Lung and rubber uprisings; the Great Depression of 1929; decreasing global demand for rubber and coffee; and the mitigative policies applied by Leopold Sabatier, administrator of Đắk Lắk province from 1914 to 1926. Sabatier, an admirer of Rhade culture, was disgusted by abuses and forced assimilation imposed by missionaries upon the native Montagnards. Sabatier openly opposed against further expansion of French industrial businesses and Vietnamese migration into the Central Highlands, which he believed to be the main threat to traditional Montagnard society. As a result, by 1940 only 5,000 French and 35,000 Vietnamese lived in the region, mostly rubber contractors and Catholic settlers, compared to 750,000 indigenous Montagnards.

==== Unrest of 1929 ====
In 1929, the price of rubber fell, and tensions rose. There were some attacks by Montagnard tribesmen against rubber plantations and transport trucks. While these were fairly minor events, the administration responded with air attacks on insurgent villages. The French also began building new roads to make it easier to monitor the area. Neo-Marxist scholar Geoffrey Gunn suggests that a growing indigenous Christian-millennialist movement among the Montagnards prior to the Montagnard revolt eight years later was a result of the French violent overreaction backlash during the economic crisis of 1929.

==== Montagnard revolt of 1937 ====
In June 1937, Montagnard villages from many different tribes led by Sam Bram, a prominent Jarai chief in the vicinity of Cheo Reo, began to form an esoteric Christian religious movement. The chief announced that his daughter had given birth to a python who was believed to be an incarnation of the Python God called Dam Klan. Sam Bram distributed magic water (Jarai: la Iun) to his followers, and preached about how the expulsion of white people and Vietnamese from the highlands would fulfill a Biblical prophecy. The new faith spread quickly to Kontum, Quảng Nam, Quảng Ngãi, and to Rhade recruits of the French garrison of Buôn Ma Thuột. Followers of Sam Bram then attacked French patrols in the highlands. The movement was quickly suppressed by the French military, although Dieu Python groups in the north of the highlands continued to resist French pacification until 1940 when tribal resistance eventually linked up with Vietnamese communists active in the region.

At the end of the revolt in 1938, Sam Bram was sentenced to ten years in prison for "sorcery with the aim of fraud by abuse of influence". Other 14 people who got involved in the movement were convicted 8 to 20 years in jail for "sorcery, secret meetings and conspiracy against the state security."

The Dieu Python movement's appeal across several distinct tribes convinced the French colonial officials, among others, of an incipient pan-highland nationalism. The French began treating the people of the Pays Moïs as one ethnicity and worthy of separate status, and attempted to suppress ethnic rivalries within the Montagnards. The French position of power also allowed them to decide which aspects of Montagnard culture should be preserved, and which ones changed; they were happy to celebrate harmless traditions such as ritual buffalo sacrifice, but continued discouraging shifting cultivation or the remnants of the Dieu Python movement. Leopold Sabatier, who had been driven out by rivals in the 1920s, was rehabilitated in French eyes as a visionary who had understood the locals. The result was the French administration presenting itself to the Montagnards as a friendly, if stern, father figure that protected them from the Kinh people, justifying the French administration as preserving Montagnard autonomy. The French military also sought to be ready to use the Highlands should a war with Japan come and they need to retreat inland.

=== French Indochina War ===
In April 1946, a Congress of the Southern National Minorities was held in Pleiku under the auspices of the Viet Minh. Ho Chi Minh, in his letter addressing the Congress, recognized the multinational nature of his proposed Vietnamese state which would be a country of the Kinh majority and 'national' minorities alike. As the struggle broke out between the French and the Viet Minh, the Montagnards were split. Later communist Vietnamese historiography would glorify resistance from Montagnard populations including the Katu, H're, Bahnar, and Cor tribes that aided the Viet Minh. Still, Kontum was a French stronghold, and the French rapidly reconquered the Central Highlands from 1945 to 1946. While the French had control of the Central Highlands and established the Montagnard autonomous region, their control was limited outside the major cities as time went on. Montagnard recruits to the French forces sometimes deserted in disgust at poor treatment from French officers, who would use their services for hard labor.

In 1950 the French government established the Central Highlands as the Pays Montagnard du Sud under the authority of Vietnamese Emperor Bảo Đại, whom the French had installed as nominal chief of state in 1949 as an alternative to Ho Chi Minh's Democratic Republic of Vietnam. While the French colonials were carrying out divide-and-rule strategy to exploit Montagnards and other tribes against the communist Vietminh, the Vietminh in turn employed the same strategy and tactics just as the French to by allying with alienated tribal leaders and dissatisfied tribes against the French. By 1953 it appears clear that the Vietminh had surpassed French efforts and much of the mountain tribes were under Vietminh control.

In the same year, the Vietminh held another congress with the attendance of 140 tribal chiefs from 20 different ethnicities across the country, in which they announced the establishment of ethnic autonomous regions for the "national minorities." By 1956, North Vietnam had created three ethnic autonomous regions.

In the mid-1950s, the once-isolated Montagnards began experiencing more contact with outsiders after the Vietnamese government launched efforts to gain better control of the Central Highlands and, following the 1954 Geneva Conference, new ethnic minorities from North Vietnam moved into the area. As a result of these changes, Montagnard communities felt a need to strengthen some of their own social structures and develop a more formal shared identity. When the French withdrew from Vietnam and recognized Vietnamese sovereignty, Montagnard political independence was drastically diminished.

=== Vietnam War ===
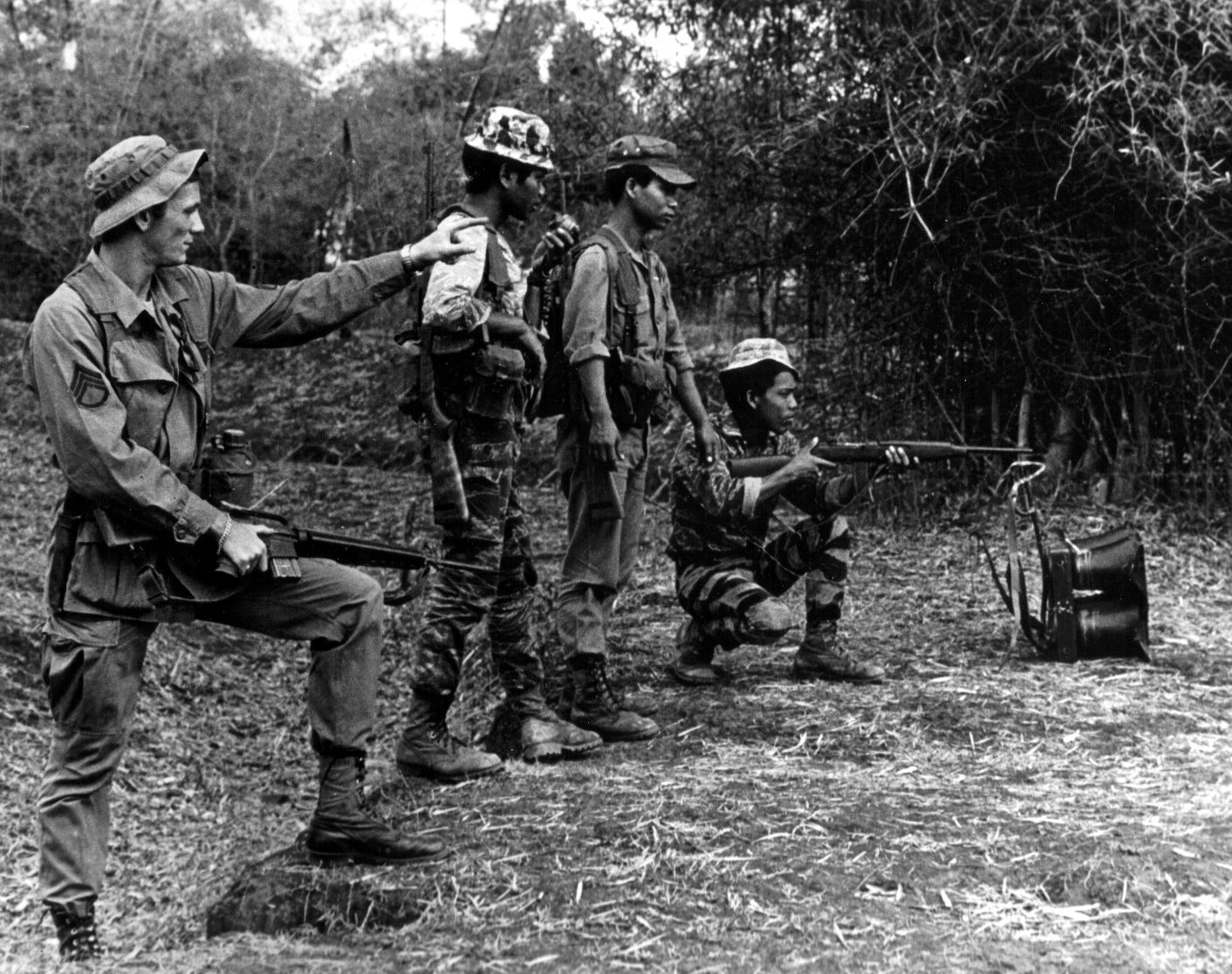
A U.S. Army Ranger trains Montagnard guerrillas

The new President of South Vietnam Ngo Dinh Diem opposed Montagnard autonomy. After introducing the 21st Act (Dụ số 21, enacted 11 March 1955), Diem abolished the Montagnard Autonomous Region. The Montagnards, Chinese, Khmer, and Cham were declared ethnic minorities. Implementing the Act disguised as Development and Land Reform Program, Diem confiscated all traditional indigenous Montagnard lands and distributed them to Kinh settlers from North Vietnam. More than one million Kinh migrants, mostly Catholic, were welcomed to settle in the Central Highlands. The Montagnards were expelled from their ancestral homelands or forced-relocated into confined strategic hamlets.

Diem continued this Development Act by forcing the Montagnards to learn Vietnamese, banning Montagnard languages in public schools, compelling the Montagnards to dress like Vietnamese, and forcing them to abandon their culture. He believed that these policies would overcoming the 'superstition', 'ignorance and backwardness' of the indigenous villagers. Chief American advisor Wolf Ladejinsky who was the architect of Diem's policies applauded the South Vietnamese development program as having progressively transformed the wilderness.

Meanwhile, in North Vietnam, Ho Chi Minh established Ethnic Autonomous Region in 1956 in accordance to the Bill no. 268/SL 7 January 1956, hinting that the North Vietnamese government recognized indigenous rights and land acknowledgements, though this did not last long. About 6,000 Rhade communists went north and trained by the North Vietnamese. US advisors, such as Price Gittinger of the US Operation Mission Agricultural Division, and Gerald Hickey, alarmed Diem that his Development Act would drive the Montagnard tribes to look for communists' support, further hurting efforts to contain communism in South Vietnam.

Wesley R. Fishel, chief executive advisor of the Michigan State University Vietnam Advisory Group (MSUG), in a letter to Bureau of Indian Affairs in Washington DC in 1956, expressed that: "This request may seem surprising, but the fact is that Viet-Nam has an Indian problem of its own, resembling in certain respects that of our own."

Meanwhile, the North Vietnamese were sending back trained Montagnard communist cadres back to the Central Highlands through the Ho Chi Minh trail, where they would play crucial roles such as recruiting Montagnard tribesmen into Vietcong guerrillas and spreading Marxist works and propaganda in indigenous languages to villages. It was estimated by the CIA that in 1961 roughly half of the highlander population of the Central Highlands were NLF sympathizers, if not outright supporters.

In 1958, the Montagnard launched a movement known as BAJARAKA (the name is made up of the first letters of prominent tribes; similar to the later Nicaraguan Misurasata) to unite the tribes against the Vietnamese. There was a related, well-organized political and (occasionally) military force within the Montagnard communities known by the French acronym, FULRO, or United Front for the Liberation of Oppressed Races. FULRO's objectives were autonomy and civil rights for the Montagnard tribes. The BAJARAKA staged a mass protest in August 1958 but was put down by South Vietnam President Ngo Dinh Diem's law enforcement forces, who implicitly perpetuated the oppressive assimilation policies on the disadvantaged indigenous communities in South Vietnam like the Chams, the Montagnards, and the Khmer Krom. Diem labeled the protest as 'pro-communist sympathizers.'

On 31 July 1958, the BAJARAKA sent two representatives, Y-Ju and Y Nam, to the US Embassy in Saigon, where they attempted to reach and inform the United Nations Secretary-General and other world leaders about the unequal Development Act of the Diem regime, which they described as racist and neocolonial.

A declaration regarding the Montagnards was released in the first meeting of the NLF (Viet Cong) in 1960. It calls for the establishment of autonomous regions in minority areas and for the abolition of the "US-Diêm clique's present policy of ill-treatment and forced assimilation of the minority nationalities." Both the NLF and Hanoi actively recruited the Montagnards into their forces from 1960, with radio broadcasting propaganda in indigenous languages began as early as 1955. Some Montagnards leaders were invited to visit North Vietnam's non-Kinh autonomous regions, along with promises of autonomy that would be granted for the Montagnards when the south is liberated. In 1961, Montagnard members of the Vietcong, led by Y Bih Aleo, a former BAJARAKA leader, formed the NLF's Montagnard Autonomy Movement.

As the Vietnam War began to loom on the horizon, both South Vietnamese and American policymakers sought to begin training troops from minority groups in the Vietnamese populace. The U.S. Mission to Saigon sponsored the training of the Montagnards in unconventional warfare by American Special Forces. These newly trained Montagnard were seen as a potential ally in the Central Highlands area to stop Viet Cong activity in the region and a means of preventing further spread of Viet Cong sympathy. Later, their participation would become much more important as the Ho Chi Minh trail, the North Vietnamese supply line for Viet Cong forces in the south, grew. The U.S. military, particularly the Special Forces, developed base camps in the area and recruited the Montagnard. The Montagnard were valued allies with their resolve, skills in tracking, and knowledge of the region; roughly 40,000 fought alongside American soldiers and became a major part of the U.S. military effort in the Highlands and I Corps, the northernmost region of South Vietnam.

The central highlands were greatly affected by American aerial bombing and herbicides during targeting of North Vietnamese materiel transportation on the Ho Chi Minh trail.

The Montagnards also cooperated with the Australians in addition to the Americans; the Australian Army Training Team Vietnam gained the support of many Montagnards by spending prolonged periods in different villages in the region, embracing their culture and gaining over a thousand recruits for the South Vietnamese army by 1964.

In 1967, the Viet Cong killed 252 Montagnards in the village of Đắk Sơn, home to 2,000 Highlanders, known as the Đắk Sơn massacre, in revenge for the Montagnards' support and allegiance with South Vietnam.

A triangle relationship developed between Black American soldiers, white soldiers, Montagnards, and Vietnamese soldiers during the height of American ground intervention in Vietnam. Black veteran Wayne Smith recalled: "some Vietnamese, you know they had some prejudices... They were discriminating against the Montagnards, the mountain people of Vietnam, who were darker complexioned... The Vietnamese treated them like white people in the South treated African Americans."

A The New York Times account in 1973 reported that land disputes between the Montagnards and the Vietnamese were deadly and reminiscent "of the American Indian situation." In October 1974, with guides from FULRO, the Montagnards staged an armed rebellion following cases of murders and mass arrests made by the South Vietnamese government.

In 1975, thousands of Montagnards fled to Cambodia after the fall of Saigon to the North Vietnamese Army, fearing that the new government would launch reprisals against them because they had aided the U.S. Army. The U.S. military resettled some Montagnards in the United States, primarily in North Carolina, but these evacuees numbered less than 2,000. In addition, the Vietnamese government has steadily displaced thousands of villagers from Vietnam's central highlands, to use the fertile land for coffee plantations.

Oscar Salemink outlines the conclusion on the dragging of indigenous peoples into the Vietnam War by the United States:

The assumption that Montagnards were primitive underscored their inherent vulnerability and innocence with respect to modernity, implying that they were victimized by the context of modern warfare. This discursive victimization of the Montagnards (by the Vietnamese, not by the French or Americans – despite the indiscriminate bombing, defoliation and resettlement!) moved the Americans to protect the underdog in this centuries-old antagonism, and hence provided an extra argument for American intervention, similar to the way the French before them had posed as nation protectrice des minorités in the Indochinese context. This denial of coevalness construed Montagnards as in need of US protection, despite the American reputation of racism and discrimination against Native Americans and Afro-Americans (who in the US context only found 'refuge' in 'Indian reservations' and 'Negro ghettos', respectively). Simultaneously, this discourse denied agency to the Montagnards: they were the victims of history, they could only react to outside developments without being capable of change themselves. The plain fact was conveniently overlooked, that many Montagnards had decided to follow the Viêt Minh in the past, and the Viêt Công in the 1960s – with Montagnard revolts being the ultimate stimulus to establish the NLF; or that many simply did not follow the Americans, and thus made a clear choice. In this narrative, Americans could not only act and think of themselves as protective heroes – good guys in an essentially corrupt cultural environment – but they could stress their essential benevolence, too, in a context which constantly seemed to question the legitimacy of their actions.

=== Post Vietnam War ===
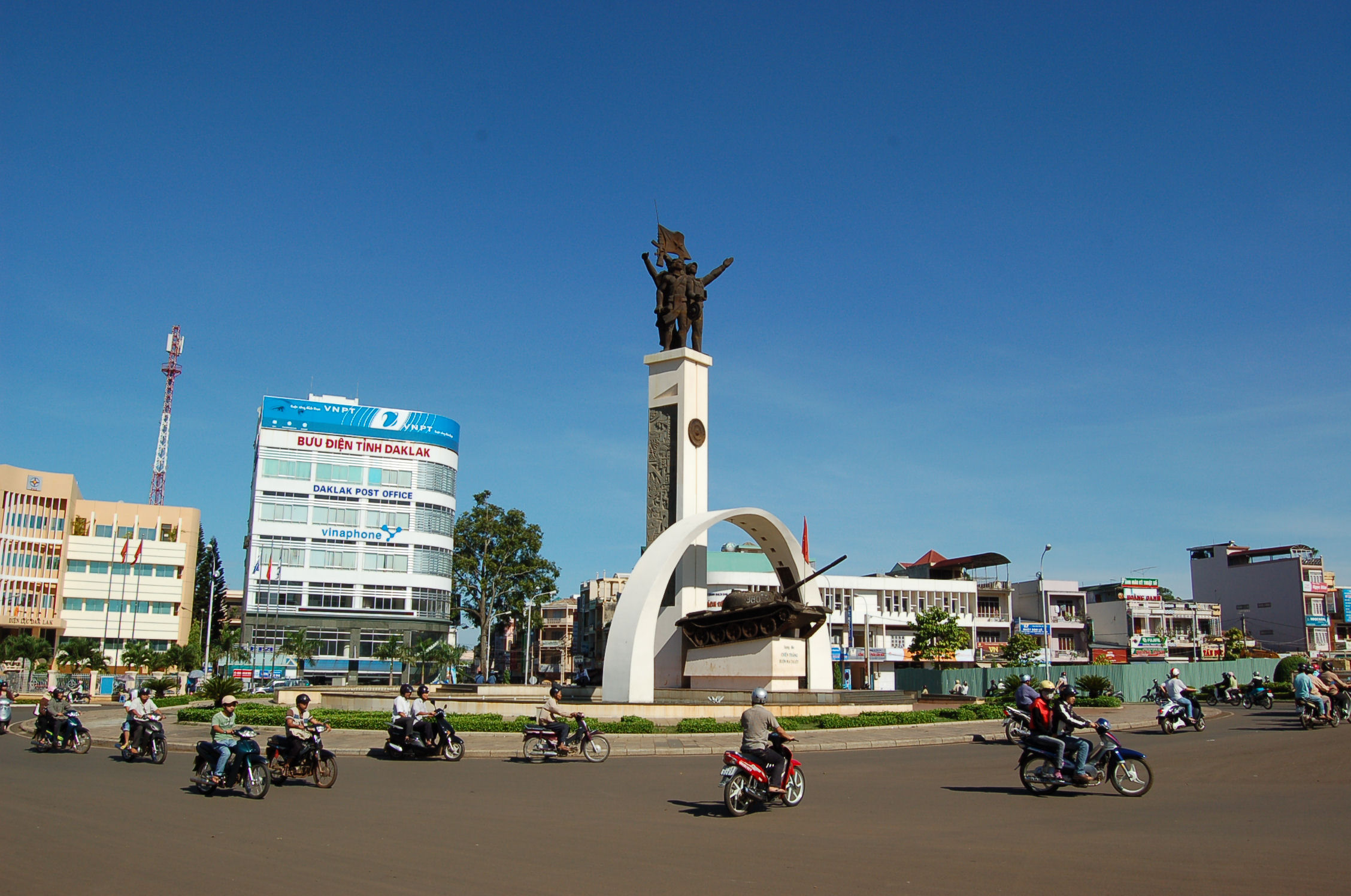
A monument in Buôn Ma Thuột commemorating the contribution of the Montagnard tribes during the Vietnam War.

Despite previous promises, the Vietnamese Communist leaders did not care about the Montagnards after the war. Vietnamese colonization of the Highlands resumed. Montagnard lands were seized and given to coffee and aluminum companies. The anticommunist wing of FULRO decided to continue their insurgency against now-unified Vietnam. Purges from the People's Army of Vietnam in 1976 and 1979 revealed that there were some Montagnards in its senior positions. FULRO continued the fight against the united Vietnamese government; the insurgency lasted into the mid-1980s.

Due to antireligious campaign of the Vietnamese communist government in 1970s, many Montagnard traditional animist religions were condemned as superstitious and excluded, as the Vietnamese government officially recognized six religions. Because of this, evangelical conversion among the Montagnard tribes during this period happened en masse. However, most of their churches are local non-denominational and non-registered from the state-recognized Evangelical Church of Vietnam (ECVN-S). Most considerably, indigenous ethnic minority Protestants prefer to have the Bible (NIV) translated to their indigenous languages, indigenous-run churches, indigenous pastors, sermons and meetings in indigenous customs inside tabernacles. However, these desires were met by suspicions and hostilities from the Vietnamese authorities, who considered non-denominational indigenous Protestantism a continuation of FULRO. In comparison, ethnic Kinh-run churches in the Highlands belonged to the Evangelical Church of Vietnam receive full legal rights and protections from the authorities. Popular but simplistic media portrayal of the Vietnamese repression of Dega Church as "communist-Christianity confrontation" is objected by scholars such as Oscar Salemink, who describes a similar pattern of Evangelization of indigenous peoples around the world, especially in the Global South, regardless of whatever political regimes, but in Vietnam the rhetorics of anti-communist vindications blame it on the communist ideology. University of London Professor Seb Rumsby further argues that Kinh chauvinism conjoint with Western media narrative accidentally push the marginalized indigenous Christians to uncritically take side with right-wing Christian conservative politics, which is the ultimate source of neocolonialism.

The final end of FULRO insurgency against Vietnam came in 1992, with the surrender of 407 FULRO fighters to United Nations' peacekeeping forces in Cambodia. They were interviewed by American journalist Nate Thayer. According to University of Texas Professor Frank Proschan, Nate Thayer successfully constructed an impression myth circulating around international media about the "valiant, loyal Montagnard people who had been decades-long fighting against Vietnamese communists", captivating the colonial nostalgia of former US Special Forces personnel for an imagined past.

It is estimated that over 200,000 Montagnards died and 85% of their villages were destroyed or abandoned during the Indochina Wars.

Most Montagnards lost their lands due to the legacy of former South Vietnam's president Ngô Đình Diệm. The indigenous peoples of the Central Highlands have deep knowledge of the local ecology and previously had life tied with forest, now strangled in impoverished separate hamlets. Uncontrolled Kinh migration from the lowland, deforestation, plantations, US bombings, defoliantation and prolonged warfare had clearing off many natural forests, pushing many rare species to extinction. Forest cover area percentage in the region had dropped significantly from 55% in 1960, to 17% in 1980.

After Vietnam's Đổi Mới in 1986, due to ever-greater global capitalist demands of coffee and valuable metals, larger waves of Vietnamese migration arrived in the Central Highlands and overwhelmed indigenous highlanders. The Vietnamese population of the region went from 500,000 in 1975, to 4 million today, outnumbering native ethnic groups three-to-one. They were called di dân tự do (spontaneous migration) and were tentatively given tolerance from Vietnamese authorities. The original peoples of the Central Highlands experienced ruin during and after the Vietnam War; in the worst cases, they were driven from their land and became refugees.

The government policy of sedentarization also left the indigenous peoples apart from society. One Vietnamese anthropologist has described a typical pattern of this impoverishment process: Kinh settlers took the opportunities of exploiting imperfect laws and the judicial system to fraudulently legitimize their assets ownership that were once belonged to indigenous peoples. As the result of being alienated from the means of production (lands), indigenous peoples of the Central Highlands became the poorest population in Vietnam, many have moved to cities and work for either Vietnamese plantation owners or foreign investment facilities, the phenomena that Salemink dubbed as proletarianization of indigenous peoples under "socialist-orientated" free market capitalist economy.

In February 2001, thousands of Montagnards participated in mass protests demanding returns of ancestral lands and religious freedom. Other such protests took place in 2002, 2004, and 2008. The protests involved marches and sit ins. The nearby government officials reacted with military involvement and police arrests. Many Montagnards such as the Jarai were put on trial and imprisoned for years for their involvement in the protests. Some Montagnards residing in the United States also traveled to Washington, D.C. to protest and bring awareness to the Montagnards back in Vietnam. Pressured by indigenous demonstrations, in July 2004 Vietnamese Prime Minister Phan Văn Khải passed Bill 134, pledged to allocate every low-income indigenous household a plot of 0.37 acre of farm land or at least 2,150 sqft (200 square meters) of housing land, also limited or suspended the uncontrolled migration of Vietnamese onto the Central Highlands.

More than 1,000 Montagnard refugees have entered Ratanakiri and Mondulkiri, Cambodia, since 2001, raising issues of Cambodia's international law obligations toward refugees and its right to control its border. The government has a policy of deporting Degar refugees to Vietnam, viewing them as illegal immigrants to the country, and has threatened prosecution of Ratanakiri residents who aid them. Human rights organizations have described this policy as a violation of Cambodia's international law obligation of non-refoulement (not forcibly returning refugees to a country in which they will be harmed). Though the United Nations High Commissioner for Refugees has become involved processing asylum applications, refugees are often forcibly returned before they are able to apply for asylum. Many refugees have hidden in Ratanakiri's forests to avoid deportation.

In 2003, the group gained admittance to the Unrepresented Nations and Peoples Organization as the "Degar-Montagnards", but this membership was discontinued in 2016. Since 1990, the Montagnard Foundation, Inc. (Vietnamese: Tổ chức Quỹ người Thượng) has been a political organization whose mission is to protect the rights of the Montagnard in Vietnam.

== Diaspora ==
Outside of southeast Asia, the largest community of Montagnards in the world is located in Greensboro, North Carolina, US. Greensboro is also the home of several community and lobbying organizations, such as the Montagnard Foundation, Inc.

== See also ==
- Persecution of the Montagnard in Vietnam
- List of ethnic groups in Vietnam
- Thủy Xá and Hỏa Xá
- Dieu Python movement
- Khmer Loeu
- Lao Theung & Lao Sung
- Montagnais, a similar French term used in North America
- Social issues in Vietnam
