= Military reforms resulting from the Yên Bái mutiny =

The failure of the Yên Bái mutiny by Vietnamese soldiers in the French colonial army on February 10, 1930, caused the French authorities to engage in a reform of military policies which were aimed at preventing future uprisings. French trust in the Vietnamese soldiers' loyalty as colonised subjects who were simultaneously enforcers of colonial order had never been high, and the mutiny resulted in increased safeguards against Vietnamese soldiers in an attempt to prevent future incidents. Around 80% of the Vietnamese soldiers in Tonkin were transferred to other districts in order to disrupt any secret plots that may have been in progress, and some soldiers who had returned from foreign service were discharged in the fear that their overseas experiences made them less likely to accept colonial subjugation. The internal reform saw the rules for expelling Vietnamese soldiers from the army liberalised and an inquiry into military intelligence resulted in closer cooperation between military intelligence and their French colonial civilian counterparts, while French officers were ordered to improve their Vietnamese language skills. The French authorities decreed that the proportion of ethnic Vietnamese soldiers was too high and reduced the proportion of Vietnamese by replacing them with European, Cambodian, Lao and ethnic minority Montagnard people.

== Military reforms precipitated by the mutiny ==
The mutiny refocused attention on the long term tension over the use of Indochinese soldiers, and on the ways in which it could be resolved. The tension could be traced back to the creation of French Indochina. Cochinchina, the European term for southern Vietnam, had been colonized in 1867 and the remaining parts of Vietnam, Tonkin and Annam, the northern and central regions were conquered in 1883. Nominally, only Cochinchina was a colony, while Tonkin, Annam, Cambodia and Laos were protectorates which together comprised French Indochina. The problem centred around the French reliance on native soldiers to maintain colonial control. This need was problematic because Indo-Chinese soldiers were both enforcers of colonial order and colonial subjects. This created constant French concerns about their loyalty. Despite several attempts to deal with the issue, the basic tension between the need for and suspicion of native troops could never be entirely resolved. The need for forces to pacify the countryside was too pressing to do without them. As a result, the tension resurfaced at regular intervals, either due to proposals to improve the position of Indochinese soldiers in the army, or after a mutiny had raised question marks about the loyalty of the soldiers.

=== Background of Vietnamese troops in the French colonial army ===
The demand for Indochinese soldiers, auxiliaries first, and then regular troops, had been present since the beginning of the French conquest. French troops were never numerically sufficient to assert control of the populace and then maintain Pax Gallica in the colony, thus requiring local reinforcements. Home grown French troops were lacking because they were too expensive for Paris and Hanoi, in contrast to the substantially cheaper native troops. A lack of manpower back in Europe caused by other imperial programs and the demographic trough caused by mass casualties in World War I on the Western Front further caused a need for the recruitment of Indochinese troops. Because French Indochina was a domination and exploitation colony rather than a settler colony, the pool of local Frenchmen was far too small to build a settler-army. Native troops generally knew the land and people much better, could be used in terrain on which foreign troops were disadvantaged. They were far more abundant than French born troops, whose deployment to Indochina was time-consuming, expensive and risky. Aside from the risks associated with the closure of sea lanes, the emergency dispatch of metropolitan troops from Paris could not be taken for granted. Particularly after 1915, French Indochina was expected to financially contribute to the defence of the colony and even to send native troops to France.

The native soldiers fulfilled a number of different purposes. Initially they were collaborators in the conquest of Indochina, helping to defeat the forces of the Nguyễn dynasty and then in its pacification. After the pacification campaign was officially completed in 1897, the two main functions of the colonial army were the maintenance of internal peace and external security. Both these tasks were fulfilled in conjunction with other armed institutions, such as the Garde indigène (later indochinoise), the Gendarmerie, the police, and the partisans in the border regions. The Garde indigène, a paramilitary force, was primarily responsible for dealing with disturbances of the peace and thus played an important role in the repression of public demonstrations and popular unrest.

In the areas bordering China, the military had a much more active role in securing the frontier against incursions by smugglers, bandits, and politically motivated militants.

The participation of native soldiers in the colonial forces was used as political symbolism, proof that the Union's five territories were rightfully under French tutelage, as evidenced by the populace's contribution of soldiers to a common army under French command. This was the "blood toll" to be paid for the Pax Gallica. In their position as colonizers and colonial subjects, the native colonial troops were also buffers between the French and the unarmed populace. Their sheer presence demonstrated French control and power to the ordinary population, posing a considerable obstacle to those who intended to overthrow French rule using violence.

The dilemma was that the French needed local soldiers to maintain the Union's internal and external peace, but could not rely on them too deeply because of an innate distrust. French concerns about disloyalty resulted from a fear that the colonialised soldiers would turn their weapons on their masters, or desert them in an emergency situation. Such fears were deeply institutionalised in the army in the form of "safe" ratios of "white" and "yellow" soldiers, the segregation of the army into its various Indochinese constituencies, and the establishment of racialised access to command hierarchies that excluded natives from becoming officers until 1929. The mutiny triggered the long existing fears about the loyalty of native soldiers, as well as many traditional French responses.

=== Transfer of soldiers ===
Soldiers in Tonkin (areas coloured red, orange and yellow), were transferred after the uprising.

In addition to the individual military punishments, the army took further internal measures to lower the risk of another insurrection. According to Maurice Rives, 10,000 Vietnamese troops were given transfers to different zones. This meant that more than 80% of Tonkin's approximately 12,000 Tirailleurs Tonkinois (Tonkinese Rifles) were moved, a transfer of enormous proportions, indicating the extent of insecurity among French commanders towards Vietnamese troops, and the extent to which they were willing to go to make future Yên Báis impossible. One possible rationale for this measure was to break up any undiscovered VNQDD cells and to sever personal ties, within units and between soldiers and civilians in their local district. The mass transfer of soldiers also had the effect of creating a state of constant mobilisation, denying troops the time and opportunity for anti-colonial organisation. In the words of a French officer who wrote in his diary under the pseudonym Bôn Mat, the measures would also force French officers to be more watchful, as "[t]roops which do not work sufficiently and which are not looked after properly, lose their spirit of discipline; or rather, unoccupied troops cannot be disciplined."

Aside from measures in Vietnam, 2,000 Indochinese soldiers returning from service in France were sent on indefinite leave and were not replaced with new recruits from Vietnam. The reason is put down by historians to be because military discipline in France was less regimented than in Indochina and other colonial garrisons. In colonial units, the colonial military and social order with Frenchmen above their indigenous troops was more easily reproduced. The French home services lacked officers specialising in commanding colonial troops; this was one of the main reasons of the disorder, as they unlike their colleagues posted to the colonies, did not know how to lead Vietnamese soldiers. Metropolitan officers also treated their Vietnamese subordinates on a more equitable basis, thereby subverting the colonial hierarchy of racial inequality under which the Vietnamese had been trained. As an example, Indochinese warrant officers had the right to command and be saluted in the metropolitan services, whereas in Vietnam only French soldiers had such rights.

Away from the discipline and the colonial hierarchy they were used to, the Vietnamese soldiers could become so alienated with their experiences that they became soft targets for communist propaganda. Upon returning home to Vietnam, they attempt to indoctrinate other troops with their Marxist doctrine. This train of thought further reinforced French perception that subversive ideas came from the outside rather than domestically: of the 57 soldiers involved in the mutiny, 17 had served abroad. On the other hand, according to the Thiry report, the proportion of soldiers with foreign service at Yên Bái did not exceed that in other garrisons, so this was not abnormal.

=== Military intelligence reforms ===
In addition to punishing soldiers, tightening dismissal regulations and reducing the number of Vietnamese servicemen in France, the French decided to improve the military intelligence service. This was to be achieved by strengthening military intelligence through closer coordination with the Sûreté, and by raising internal standards. In terms of coordination, an inquiry into the mutiny at Yên Bái showed that cooperation between Resident Massimi and Commandant Le Tacon did not exist despite multiple requests, and that this was partly responsible for the failure to prevent the uprising. Although the relationship between the civilian authorities in Tonkin and the military were traditionally marked by rivalry, Yên Bái stood out in the total lack of military–civilian cooperation. Further VNQDD conspiracies to foment mutinies in other garrisons, such as Kien An, were detected and scotched at late notice. Although the performance of the intelligence service was regarded as being substandard at Yên Bái, the army command in Vietnam realised, under criticism from civil authorities who claimed they had not been sufficiently cooperative in the past, that the teamwork with the Sûreté had to be raised to greater heights to prevent future Yên Bái style rebellions. For such reasons, Patrice Morlat wrote that the mutiny at Yên Bái allowed the Sûreté to "penetrate indirectly into the military sector which had till then been inaccessible".

However, this indirect penetration in the aftermath of the Yên Bái mutiny seems to have been the evolution of a process that had begun at least six months earlier. Several sources indicate that this was triggered by the French crackdown on the VNQDD and other revolutionary independence organisations in early 1929. The crackdown had uncovered the extent of the VNQDD's systematic infiltration of the army, and had prompted a military crackdown on troops with connections to such organisations. By October 1929, after heavy civilian criticism of the military's information policy in July, army authorities had realised the need to systematically gather intelligence to deal with the threat from new forms of anti-colonial organisation. As such information could be collected only by the Sûreté, the implication was that the military had to work more closely with the colonial political police. Three weeks before Yên Bái, Governor General Pasquier had congratulated General Commandant Superior Aubert on the "most favourable results" of "close [military–civilian] collaboration".

The events at Yên Bái mutiny and the discovery that the VNQDD had infiltrated many other units reinforced the need for closer military–civilian relations and fast tracked the process of improved relations. According to Morlat, the Sûreté's indirect penetration of military affairs involved linking the military intelligence service (SRM) to the Sûreté and the information provided by it, thereby making itself dependent on the political information and even political judgement and agenda of the civilian authorities. The central SRM then relayed this information to its local branches as part of its SRM Bulletin. There, "ALL OFFICERS (and not just those of the SRM" [capitals and brackets in original] were to be participate in the study of the revolutionary groups. As a result of the uprising, the SRM became more closely linked to the Sûreté and its methodology and philosophy in of analysing Vietnamese anti-colonial activity. The number of recipients of such intelligence increased markedly due to the decision to have all officers involved in studying revolutionary parties. The focus thus widened from observing only internal army activities to include developments among Vietnamese anti-colonial organisations at large.

As rivalries continued to exist between military and civil authorities, the military intelligence service did not completely fall under the sway of the Sûreté, but it was strongly influenced by the institutionalised cooperation and the Sûreté's style of analysing Vietnamese anti-colonial politics: it also benefited from an improved flow of information between the two intelligence agencies. Whether the institutionalised sharing of intelligence and enhanced understanding of anti-colonial organisations would lead to more effective prevention, depended largely on the internal operations of the military intelligence service. The mutiny had exposed flaws in the local and central SRM, the result of both personal and institutional deficiencies. Commandant Le Tacon, who had been responsible for organising the local SRM, had been unable to understand the graveness of the predicament despite several warnings. The central SRM may have prevented the mutiny if the officer responsible for Yên Bái, Slouchez, had informed his local contact, Tran Uc Sinh, about his leave of absence or if he had taken the required precautions of arranging cover during his absence. These oversights were particular to Yên Bái, whereas planned VNQDD mutinies in many other garrisons, such as Kien An, Phu Lang Thuong, Nam Dinh and Sept Pagodes, were prevented at the last moment. The intelligence failure at Yên Bái did not reflect weaknesses in the overall organisational hierarchy of the SRM, or failures in the decentralisation measures which had started in early 1929 but which had not yet been finished.

Although Yên Bái was the exception, this did not mean that the SRM ran smoothly or that the performance standards could not be higher. A month after the mutiny, General Commandant Superior Aubert circulated SRM Notice 660, on March 11, 1930, to describe (and prescribe) the morale and techniques needed for an effective intelligence service. It stressed the importance of understanding the objectives and organisational structure of anti-colonial parties and then advised on the ways in which the revolutionary threat could be nullified. The note also deemed it necessary to remind its recipients about two earlier intelligence communications – of February 25 and October 17, 1929 – thus indicating that they had not been taken on board completely. One of the reasons given for this was what was seen as the complacent attitude of many officers, in assuming that they could "preserve [their] units from revolutionary propaganda" and related to this, the low morale of many European warrant officers who regarded "their [intelligence] role as ending when their working hours are over". Apart from indicating what officers should be giving their due diligence, Aubert's note also indicated the means by which critical intelligence information could be obtained. This largely depended on close collaboration with Vietnamese warrant officers who had an important intelligence role in their position as a conduit between their French masters and their Vietnamese troops. The flow of intelligence between French officers and Vietnamese warrant officers was not as smooth as desired. The French were often not tactful and discreet enough, and many were not, due to a lack of language skills or interest, "in real contact with the indigenous warrant officers." On the other hand, the Vietnamese were not very open with regard to the provision of information, and thus did not take (co-)responsibility "for the maintenance of the troops' good spirit". Despite the air of good appearance and behaviour of the Vietnamese warrant officers and tirailleurs, they often misled their French superiors about their knowledge of subversive activities. This posed a major problem in intelligence gathering, necessitating the cross-checking of information, as well as threatening harsh penalties if information was withheld.

Historical consensus notes that irrespective of whether military duty in the France was productive or not, the time spent by the Vietnamese soldiers in France had a profound transformation on them in both the social and individual sense. Inside as well as outside the barracks, the Vietnamese servicemen were often treated more equitably than in their home country. They encountered intellectual thought not openly promulgated in Vietnam. They could relate to Frenchmen, have relations with French women, and with other colonised peoples present in France. Furthermore, they could see that France too was in a state of change. As a result of their overseas service, at least some of the returning troops would attempt to rationalise the differences between their experiences in the two countries. Coupled with the differences in colonial and metropolitan discipline, this is postulated to have bred a more critical stance towards their superiors and a more critical attitude towards the colonial order.

In addition to the measures intended to help identify, isolate or eliminate soldiers of suspect loyalty, the regulations for dismissal were liberalised. The French military authorities had long complained that the rules were biased in favour of the soldiers. They complained that while the chief French provincial administrator could dismiss a native Garde indigène without notice if they were regarded as suspect, this was virtually impossible in the army due to legal constraints. They blamed this for the higher rate of mutiny in the army. The military managed to have the regulations changed. A decree of April 8, 1930 permitted the General Commandant Superior "to discharge those soldiers who had been the object of convictions in excess of three months imprisonment by a military tribunal, or who would have rendered themselves guilty of activities contrary to military duty". While the guidelines for sacking remained narrow, with only the highest officer in Indochina allowed to authorise these measures, and only under certain conditions, the last clause in the decree of April 8 could be interpreted freely.

=== Vietnamese language skills of French officers ===
Aubert's notice stressed the importance of close contact between French officers and their Vietnamese warrant officers in order to improve the quality of intelligence, but did not discuss whether this also required French officers to improve their Vietnamese language skills. The annual report of 1930 considered the language was a problem because "[i]t would be . . . . desirable that the biggest possible number of officers and warrant officers had a sufficient Annamite language knowledge in order to permit them to do without an interpreter when dealing with the Tirailleurs." The report mentions the creation of a "centre of Annamite studies" in Toulouse as a first step in improving language skills and put high expectations on the fact that the "number of tirailleurs speaking French is increasing constantly". Such measures would ideally have increased the level of direct communication between French officers and NCOs and their Vietnamese subordinates. However, improvement in horizontal communication was not what the report principally had in mind, but rather using language skills as a tool of command to reinforce hierarchical relationships.

The report also toyed with the concept of using specialised Vietnamese language skills as a means of gathering intelligence and to control the minds of Vietnamese troops, but discarded it. The presence of three Vietnamese language specialists at Yên Bái had been unable to stop the mutiny; the persistent anti-colonial penetration of the civil administration had occurred despite its many specialists. Furthermore, the experience of Roman Catholic missionaries indicated that language specialisation was becoming increasingly ineffective in countering the trend towards more secretive and effective anti-colonial organisation. The report thus concluded that deeper specialisation would not improve intelligence and that a degree of expertise – to improve command skills – was all that one would need.

The report further argued that excessive specialization would be counterproductive and thus detrimental. It strongly opposed extensive specialisation because it would have required long tours in Indochina, which was deemed to be detrimental to the health of the specialist. More importantly, there was a suspicion that specialists became too trusting towards their Vietnamese subordinates, to the extent of becoming indigenophiles. This was contrary to the needs and functions of a colonial army in which hierarchies and distance, even linguistic distance from subordinates had to be maintained. Finally, specialisation was said to be detrimental because it would not only make Vietnamese troops more secretive, but would very likely improve their organisational abilities, since they would need to "take even more precautions".

=== Decrease in the proportion of Vietnamese troops ===
Although the reaction, which included punishment, new regulations, SRM institutional reform, fewer Vietnamese serving in France, increased specialisation – were considerable, military and civilian authorities in both Vietnam and France did not believe them sufficient for the reassertion of control over their colonised troops. A further four decisions were implemented, aimed at striking the a stable racial balance among the troops in French Indochina. The number of ethnic Vietnamese soldiers was perceived to be too great and thus threatening in the wake of the mutiny: a safer level had to be found, in order to counterbalance what was considered to be an excessive level of numerous Vietnamese troops. This safer proportion aimed at an overall ratio among Indochina's colonial troops of 1:1 ethnic Vietnamese to European and indigenous ethnic minorities (Montagnards). The measures demonstrated the French distrust of Vietnamese troops and the apparent belief that the fidelity of Vietnamese soldiers was maximised by creating a racial balance within the army that was tilted towards showing all Vietnamese soldiers – and thereby the Vietnamese population at large – the futility of attempting insurrection and mutiny.

The first of the four measures aimed at increasing the dependability of Vietnamese soldiers which also aimed at achieving the right ethnic proportion of troops at each garrison. The lack of European troops at Yên Bái – aside from Massimi's and Le Tacon's personal failures – had been pinpointed as the cause of the mutiny. The proposal held that if the local commanding officer had more European troops at his disposal, their presence would have deterred the Vietnamese soldiers from taking part in the mutiny. Although this was plausible in that one of the leaders of the mutiny had attempted to foment his Vietnamese colleagues by pointing to the weak French presence, this internal argument overlooked the haphazard command and security procedures that had left Yên Bái vulnerable.

According to the anonymous diary of a French officer, the decision to "return to the old system of white safety garrisons next to important detachments of tirailleurs" came after an exhaustive debate between French Indochina's civilian and military authorities. The decision reversed a major reorganisation of the army that had been launched by General Aubert in 1928. Its reversal demonstrated the concern about the impact of revolutionary propaganda on the loyalty of Vietnamese troops, and the consequent uncertainty about the reliability of this instrument of colonial rule. The measure was aimed at demonstrating French strength and superiority over Vietnamese soldiers and revolutionaries, and signified that physical power was at the heart of French colonial rule in Indochina.

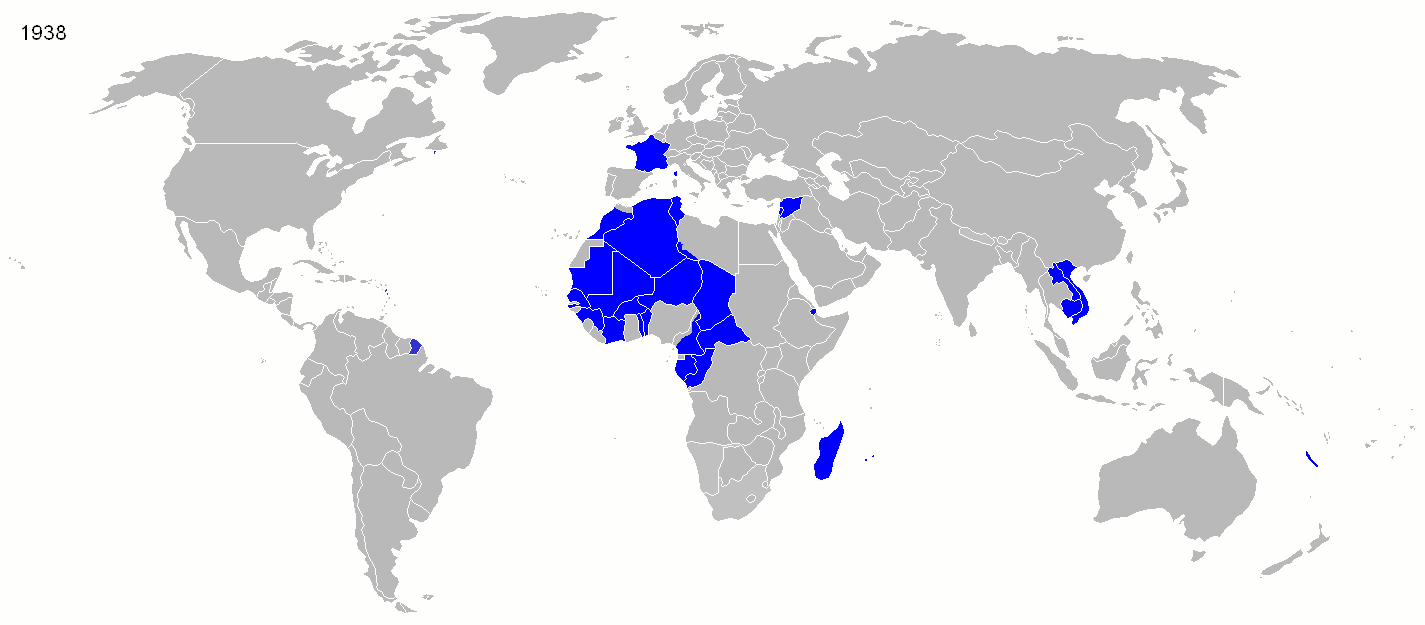
The authorities considered relieving Vietnamese soldiers with troops from North Africa, where France had its largest colonial holdings.

The most sweeping suggestion was made by Resident Superior Robin who wanted to "completely and radically abolish all regiments of Tirailleurs tonkinois in the service in the delta and the middle regions" and relieve them with "white [Foreign] Legion or even North African Battalions". This proposal was rebuffed by General Aubert who initially advocated the abolition of four tirailleurs companies to compensate for the dispatch of a [Foreign] Legion Battalion, and the replacement of three Vietnamese companies by three Montagnard ones. Governor General Pasquier eventually reached a compromise proposal with General Aubert, which was then submitted to the Minister of Colonies. It proposed the "[abolition] of one Regiment of Tirailleurs Tonkinois [13 companies, one company HR, and four machinegun sections]".

Two major arguments were put against any reduction in Vietnamese troops. The Cabinet of the Director of the Military Services Direction had reasoned that a reduction in the number of Vietnamese soldiers would evoke feelings of bitterness among dismissed soldiers and turn them into "declared enemies of France". The more prominent argument was that it would weaken the defence of French Indochina. The second argument was repeated robustly in the Colonial Consultative Defence Council's advice to the Minister of Colonies, reasoning that the reduction in the number of Indochinese troops in Indochina could not "be envisaged under any pretext" because of the "necessities of external defence". Despite the counter-arguments, the abolition of two Annamite battalions was enacted. Policy strategists calculated that the reduction in Vietnamese troops could be made up by a concomitant increase in the number of European and ethnic minority troops.

The third decision made with the objective achieving a safer racial ratio in the army was the "[r]einforcement of the occupation corps' troops by three white battalions: one Foreign Legion battalion, [and] two Colonial Infantry battalions". This decision was causally linked to the first two decrees and complemented them. If European troops were placed next to Vietnamese ones, then despite the reduction in Vietnamese troops by two battalions, more European troops would be needed. As the Colonial Consultative Defence Council had informed the Minister of Colonies that the overall level of troops in Indochina could not be reduced for external defence reasons, this necessitated the replacement of at least the two disbanded Vietnamese battalions.

Prior to the mutiny, the Department of War had clearly indicated that it would not be able "to provide for one more European Battalion in Indochina in the 1931 Budget" due to fiscal constraints, manpower shortages and organizational problems. The Yên Bái mutiny prompted generated the political will to send more European troops to French Indochina. As early as mid-March 1930, the Colonial Consultative Defence Committee informed the Colonies Minister that the forces stationed in Tonkin would be increased by a European Colonial Infantry Battalion. However, the fear in the aftermath of the mutiny situation was such that a political decision to send two rather than one battalion. It was complemented by "the urgent dispatch of a Foreign Legion Battalion to Tonkin", an action ordered by the French government on April 30, 1930. Aside from replacing two Vietnamese battalions with three French battalions, the French authorities also increased the number and proportion of ethnic minorities among the Indochinese troops. As such, the "[i]ntensification of recruitment of non-Annamite indigenous people: Thos, Laotians, Mois, Cambodians was decided." The aim was to attain increase the non-Vietnamese percentage to 50%.
