= 1912-1935 Ethnic Rebellion of Cambodia =

Location	Indochina
Result	French victory

Belligerents
French Colonial Empire	N'Trang Lơng's united tribes

Commanders and leaders
Albert-Pierre Sarraut; Pierre Pasquier	N'Trang Lơng †

Units involved
Georges-Yves-Marie Nyo Henri Maître †	R’Dinh (POW); Bu Luk-Amprad; Bơ N’Xinh (POW); R’Ong Leng †; B’heng Reng; Bơ Rơi

Between 1912 and 1935, an alliance of native peoples in what is now western Cambodia and Vietnam's Central Highlands rebelled against French colonizers. Their leader, N'Trang Lơng, whose name was recorded by the French as Pa-Trang-Loeng, united multiple diverse tribes, such as the Phnong, Stieng, and Mnong, the latter of which Lơng was a part of. Initially beginning with a series of tribal retalliation upon French outposts in Kratié, the conflict would escalate in 1914 with the assassination of explorer First Class Counselor Henri Maitre and his entire personnel at the hands of Lơng and his rebels. The insurgents established the Nam Nung base, which consisted of thousands of kilometres of land. The war ended with a French victory during the Siege of Nam Nung in the May of 1935.

== Precursors ==
In the decade of the 1900s, the French colonists were tightening their grip in what is now Cambodia and Vietnam, especially in and around the Central Highlands region. The French allowed Ethnic groups to live in villages under the lead of elders, but they were required to pay taxes and supply Corvée labour. They also bent their will before the colonizers when commanded to do so.

Beginning in 1909, the French began to establish outposts near modern-day Kratié and Mondulkiri, centralized around the large Haut-Chhlong outpost. The Colonizers hoped to establish a formal Province in the region. Various villages of many Ethnic groups were driven out of their homes. N'Trang Lơng, an elder from a Mnong village, rallied other tribal leaders and stood their ground. Lơng's forces quickly grew from a few hundred to over five thousand. The Ethnic army was divided among chieftains, each of whom possessed about 200 fighting men and a base. They would also utilize guerrilla warfare. All the chieftains answered to Lơng. The Bal Ty Lah Bôn Lan unit consisted of scouts, grassroots activists, and spreaders of propaganda. The armies saw little action until 1912.

== The War ==
=== 1912-1922 ===
Albert-Pierre Sarraut, the governor-general of Indochina, ordered fresh attacks targeting the movement. The French scorched numerous villages and killed N'Trang Lơng's wife and many of his children.

The colonizers were not prepared for the ensuring onslaughts. They were also unaccustomed to the many rugged landscapes on which they battled upon. The rebels conquered various outposts, including one at the mountain Phnom Nam Lyr.

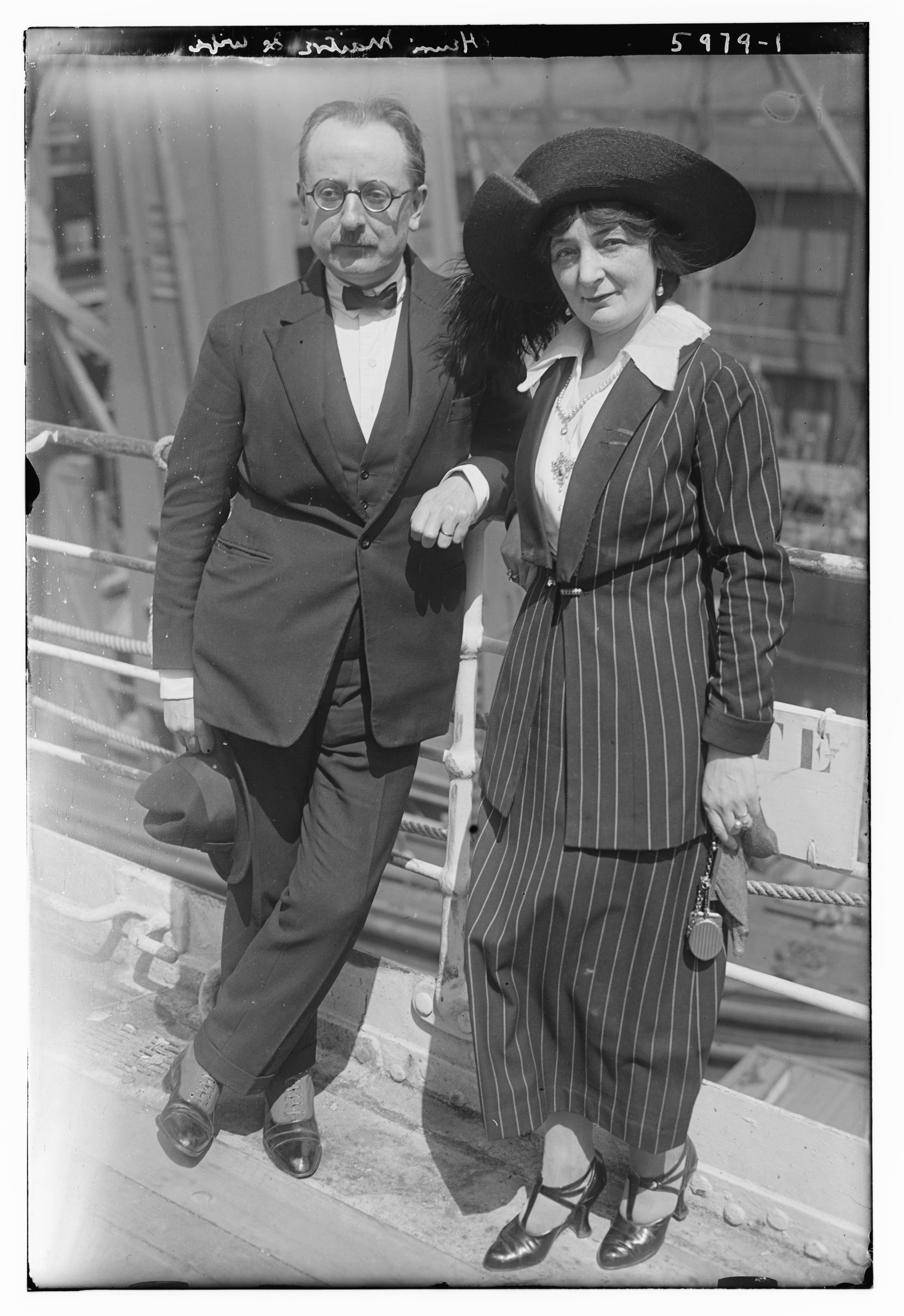
Henri Maitre and his wife, taken in 1900

On 2 August 1914, Henri Maitre, a famed explorer who was spearheading the region's further oppression and establishment into a province of the French Colonial Empire, was invited for negotiations at N'Trang Lơng's village. Maitre and his complete garrison arrived. Joined by nine of his men, Maitre visited Lơng's hut; all ten men were subsequently killed. That following night, the rest of the garrison was slain, totaling 40 dead Frenchmen. Maitre entered Martyrdom, with he and his men's death outraging many senior officials and making headlines back in France.

The rebels consolidated themselves at the forested and expansive Nam Nung territory. Due to the greatness of the forests, the French struggled to pinpoint the exact location of Nam Nung's core base.

=== 1923-1934 ===
During intervals of peace the Ethnic troops converted to a functioning agricultural society under Lơng's continued command.

In 1928, the French Colonials began the building of Route 14, bridging Ho Chi Minh City to the contested Central Highlands. The project faced multiple attack which killed several senior leaders. The dawn of the 1930's saw multiple rebel victories and the further destruction of outposts. In response, a new campaign was initiated by the French. Governor-general Pierre Pasquier ordered the "pacification of the Central Highlands at all costs" in 1933. The French recruited soldiers from other Ethnic groups, including the Khmer, to fight the insurgents rather than their own troops. The rebels were quickly outnumbered and Lơng withdrew his forces into the forest to recoup.

A new wave of attacks came in 1933. Multiple settlements were reclaimed by the rebels. The various skirmishes and retakings climaxed in a battle on 20 March 1933 within the territory of Nam Nung. R’Dinh, Lơng's "right-hand man," was captured in the battle along with multiple chieftains killed. Mnong chiefs R'ong Lng and Bơ N'Xingh were taken prisoner as well. R'Dinh was brutally tortued for many months, but refused to give away the location of the hidden Nam Nung base.

In the following 2 years, Lơng and his forces delved even deeper, scoring several more victories and felling many major outposts.

=== The war's end ===
In the May of 1935, the French finally discovered the location of the Nam Nung base thanks to an infiltrator, Bă Phông Phê. The base was suddenly raided by a swarm of French invasion force on 20 May. The rebel movement had been regaining momentum since the prior 1933 assault on their territory, but the Siege of Nam Nung would ultimately crush it. The French came from four fronts and were aided from the air and by the heavy artillery which the technologically primitive rebels lacked. The aircraft were commanded by Commander Georges-Yves-Marie Nyo, who later lead the final French victories over Phu Mu Bun revolutionaries in the Holy Man's Rebellion.

The siege lasted many days and saw the deaths and capturing of various Ethnic leaders, including N'Trang Lơng's brother, who vanished after having suffered a wound. Three of Lơng's remaining children were captured. On the night of 22 May 1935, N'Trang Lơng was shot and captured by the French. Nam Nung fell to the colonists and the insurgents were squashed.

On the 25 June 1935, N'Trang Lơng was executed by the French.
