= Pa-Trang-Loeng =

Leader of 1912-1935 tribal uprising against the French

- N'Trang Lơng
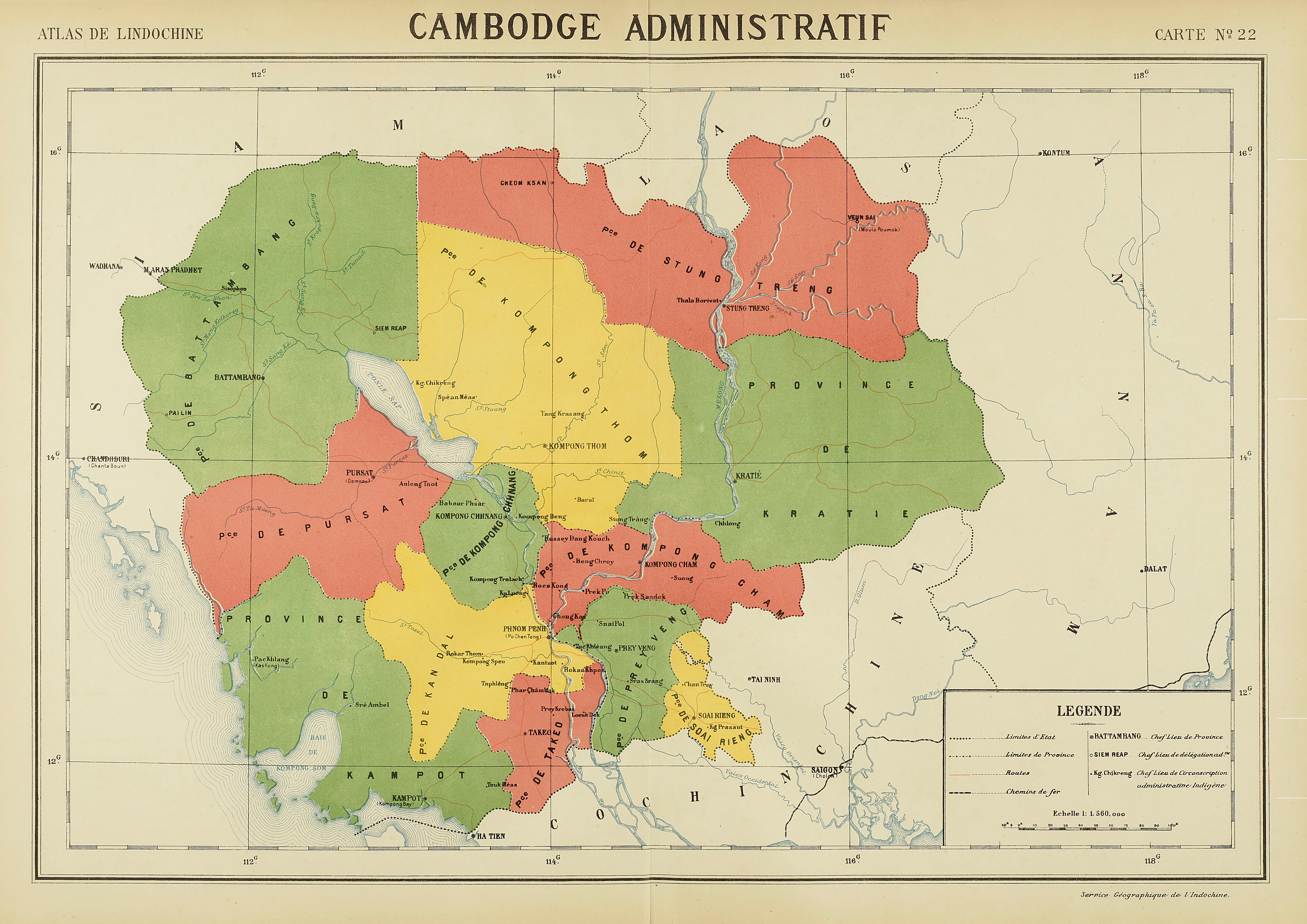
- Map of 1920's Cambodian Administrative Divisions
- Born: 1870; Bu Par village
- Died: 1935 (aged 64–65)
- Other name: Pou-Tran-Leung
- Title: Chief of the Mnong
- Movement: Ethnic Phnong Rebellion

Pa-Trang-Loeng (Pou Tran Lung), born N'Trang Lơng, was a Mnong chief and rebel leader in early 1900's Cambodia and Vietnam. He led the largest Indochinese tribal uprising against the French Colonizers. During the war, he also commanded invasions against the French-occupied Khmer, Vietnamese, and Chinese. The war lasted from 1912 to 1935. Loeng was captured and then killed by French officers in 1935, over three decades after his first major attack. He was based in the expansive Nam Nung territory. He united multiple diverse tribes in his rebellion, with the most notable of the allied tribes being the Phnong and Stieng.

== Biography ==
Local historical records state that N'Trang was not just chief of his tribe, but also one of the most intelligent men in his village. He raised many farm animals along with having an abundance of corn and rice. He became the richest man in the M'nong Plateau region. He was said to have been a good helper to the people in his village and he gave a lot of his resources to the less fortunate.

Pa-Trang-Loeng led multiple attacks at and near Kratié outposts in response to French colonization. In August 1914, Trang invited French explorer and First Class Counselor Henri Maitre to his home plateau. Henri, who had been known for cruel and discriminatory acts against the Mnong people, was told negotiations would be made, but was instead assassinated by Trang.

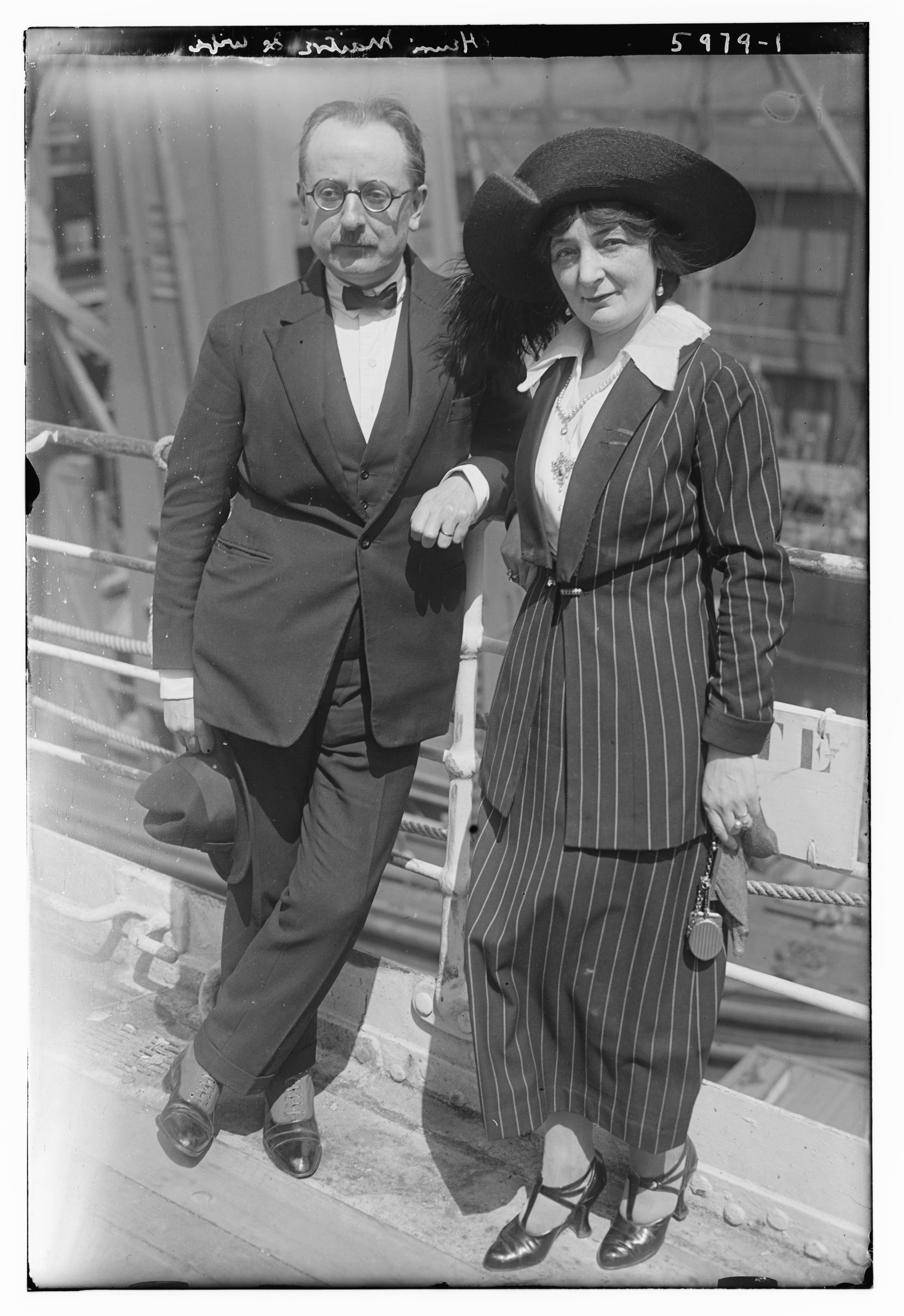
French explorer Henri Maître and his wife seven years before he died in one of Loeng's attacks.

And so, the rebellion against the French began. Trang led a rebel army of multiple tribes to numerous victories, eventually gaining thousands of square kilometers of land and establishing the Nam Nung base area. The French struggled in the unfamiliar terrain of the area, but sent many infiltrators in attempts to divide the rebellion. In May 1935, the French army gathered and attacked Nam Nug from three different directions. Many chiefs were either killed or surrendered. The siege went on for many days as the French established outposts around the base. His wife was a casualty and his brother was wounded and fled. Three of his children were captured. On the night of May 22, 1935, Trang was seriously wounded by a gunshot by French colonists and captured. The uprising came to an end following his imprisonment.

On the 25 June 1935, N'Trang Lơng was executed by the French.
