= Henri Maitre =

French explorer (1883–1914)

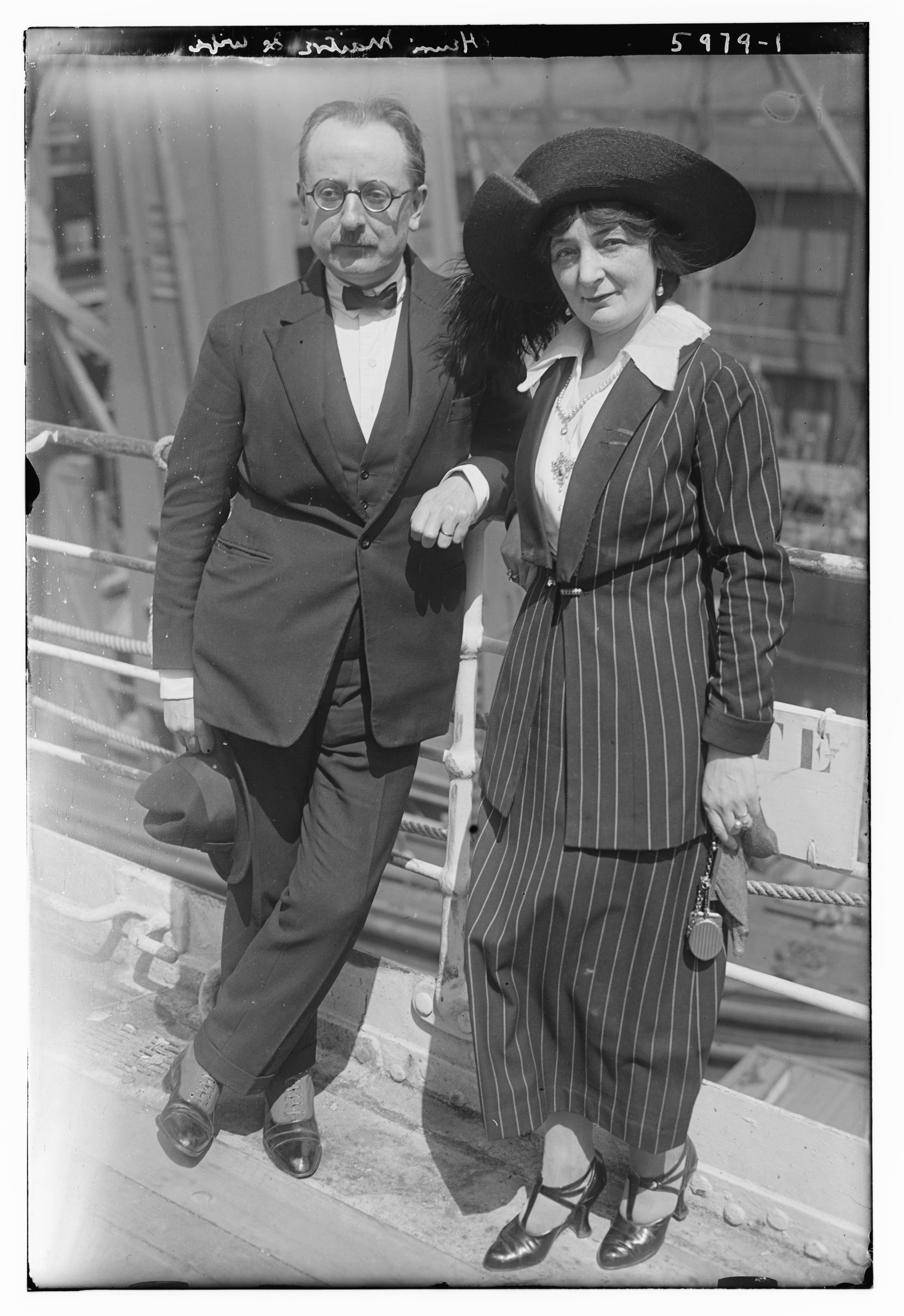
- Henri Maitre (left) and his wife (right)
- Born: July 12, 1883; Thonon-les-Bains, France
- Died: July 30, 1914 (aged 31); Tuy Đức, Vietnam
- Resting place: 12.24395°N 107.43610°E
- Occupations: explorer, ethnographer

Henri Maitre (12 July 1883 – 30 July 1914) was a French explorer and ethnographer of French Indochina.

== Life ==
Born on 12 July 1883 in Thonon-les-Bains, in 1902 at the age of 19 he leaves France for Shanghai in order to work for the Chinese Maritime Customs Service.

In 1905 he leaves China and goes to French Indochina where he visits Haiphong, Hanoi, and Guangzhouwan. He finally settles in Buôn Ma Thuột in the Central Highlands of Vietnam where he starts working for the Annam civil services. There, he is tasked with researching the topography and ethnography of Darlac province.

In 1908 he goes back to Paris in order to present his book, Les Régions Moï du Sud Indo-Chinois, at the Société de Géographie. He receives the Armand Rousseau prize and the book is published in 1909.

In 1910 he travels back to Indochina, this time in Kratié province, Cambodia. There he funds the Bou Pou Sra outpost in the jungle from which he continues his ethnographic work.

In 1911 he goes to Paris again in order to present his new book Les Jungles Moï. This time he receives the Pierre-Félix Fournier prize and the book is published in 1912.

In 1913 he travels to Indochina for the third and last time. This time however he will not be able to continue his work because of multiple attacks on the Kratié outposts by the Mnong people during the 1912-1935 tribal uprising.

On 30 July 1914 (or 2 August 1914 according to some sources), local Mnong chief Pa-Trang-Loeng invited Henri Maitre to his village of Bon Bu Nơr (now part of Tuy Đức, Vietnam) for negotiations. But instead of negotiations, a surprise attack was launched and he was assassinated.

His burial place, long lost, was finally rediscovered in 2012.
