= Dieu Python movement =

In 1937, a Vietnamese Montagnard village chief by the name of Sam Bam announced that his daughter had given birth to a Burmese python. The Montagnards began to stop cultivating their land, because they believed that this python was the Python God (Dieu Python) sent to rid the Central Highlands of Vietnam, of all foreigners. People began to attack the French because they had been given "magical water" which were to make them invulnerable to French bullets. This rebellion was quickly repressed by the French.

The French interpreted this rebellion as an expression of dissatisfaction of colonial rule; later the Catholic mission interpreted this as a movement stirred by sorcerers with Viet. This revived the anthropological tradition of having ethnographic material performed on the region for the benefit of the colonial government.

== See also ==
- Montagnard Foundation
