= Thủy Xá and Hỏa Xá =

Two former Jarai tribes in Vietnam

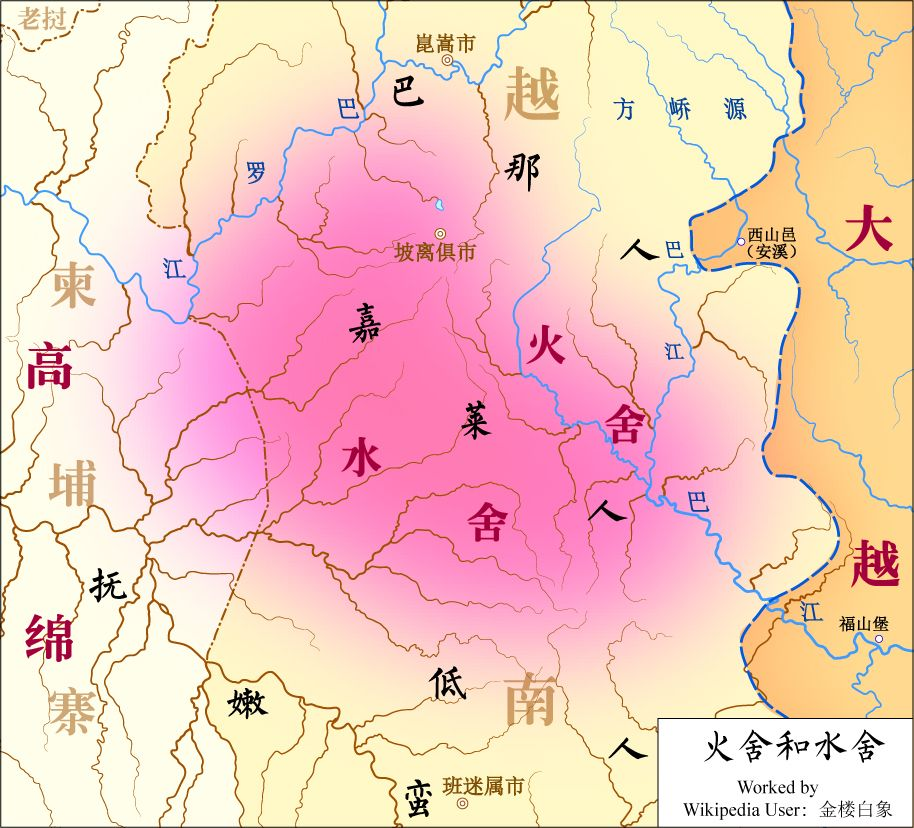
location of Thủy Xá (水舍) and Hỏa Xá (火舍).

Thủy Xá (chữ Hán: 水舍, lit. "Water Haven") and Hỏa Xá (chữ Hán: 火舍, "Fire Haven") are Vietnamese names referring to two former Jarai chiefdoms located in Central Highlands of Vietnam. Their leaders used the title "King of Water" (Jarai: Pơtao Ia; Rade: Mtao Êa; Vietnamese: Thủy Vương; Khmer: Sdech Tưk ស្តេចទឹក; Laotian: Sadet nam ສະເດັດນ້ຳ), "King of Fire" (Jarai: Pơtao Apui; Rade: Mtao Pui; Vietnamese: Hỏa Vương; Khmer: Sdech Phlơng ស្តេចភ្លើង; Laotian: Sadet Fai ສະເດັດໄຟ) and the lesser-known "King of Wind" (Jarai: Pơtao Angin) respectively. The Jarai word Pơtao were often translated as "king" but were never real kings, actually they were ritual masters of fire, water and wind.

According to research, these tribes located in the valley of Ayun and Ba River, modern day Ayun Pa (a district in Gia Lai Province) and Ea Súp (a district in Đắk Lắk Province).

Water and Fire Kingdoms were descendants of Cham people. The two kings occupied themselves with magic and sorcery, bewitching the people. According to legend, King of Water could pray for rain, and King of Fire could pray for hot weather. Their sorcery were known by Cambodian. In order to pray for peace and prosperity, the Cambodian king offered sacrifices to the two tribes every three years.

== Fire Kingdom ==
Fire Kingdom Jrai were reported by French missionary Fr. Bouillevaux. He made an incursion through the Mekong in 1850 and mentioned about certain "King of Fire", a man of respect belonging to a certain group of people called Jarai.

After the 1893 Franco-Siamese crisis, the French consolidated their administration in Laos, the authority of Central Highlands was given to the commissioner at Stung Treng, then in lower Laos. Jarai people resisted and defeated the French colonizers in 1894, but later were conquered by a large column of French troops in January 1897. The Master of Fire killed a French Prosper Marie Patrice Odend'hal in 1904. Soon they were attacked by a French army led by Vincillionni, the Master of Fire had to flee.

In the same year, these territories were officially integrated into the protectorate of Annam, became a part of Plei Ku Der Province.

The last Fire King died in 1987. His designated successor Siu Aluân never succeeded the office, apparently because of concerns by the Vietnamese authorities. Siu Aluân died in 1999 without news of a successor.

== See also ==
- Degar
