= Phnom Nam Lyr =

Basalt hill in Mondulkiri province, Cambodia

- Phnom Namlear, Phnom Nam Lear, ភ្នំណាមលៀរ, Phnom Lu Bran

Highest point
- Elevation: 1,030 m (3,380 ft)
- Coordinates: 12.53817°N 107.5353°E

Geology
- Rock age: Quaternary
- Rock type: Basalt

Phnom Nam Lyr is a 1030 m basalt hill in eastern Mondulkiri province, close to the border with Vietnam. The site is sacred to the Bunong people. The rock is part of the Chhlong Plateau, a Quaternary period volcanic basaltic dome, that has been heavily eroded to form hills and valleys.

The site is being considered as a UNESCO Global Geopark. The site is a popular tourist attraction for tourists.
