= Kiến An =

- Ward
- Food Service Vocational School
- Interactive map of Kiến An
- Coordinates: 20.807444184486396°N 106.6255573177407°E
- Country: Vietnam
- Region: Red River Delta
- Municipality: Hai Phong
- Established: 16 June 2025
- Administrative headquarters: No. 02 Cao Toàn Street

Area
  - Total: 11.18 km^{2} (4.32 sq mi)

Population (2025)
  - Total: 67,236
  - Density: 6,012/km^{2} (15,570/sq mi)
- Website: kienan.haiphong.gov.vn

Kiến An is a ward in the municipality of Hai Phong, Vietnam. The ward inherited its name from the former Kiến An district.

The area of present-day Kiến An Ward was formerly located in Kiến An district, Hai Phong.

On 16 June 2025, the Standing Committee of the National Assembly of Vietnam issued a resolution on the arrangement of commune-level administrative units in Hai Phong in 2025. Under the resolution, parts of Nam Sơn, Đồng Hòa, Bắc Sơn, Trần Thành Ngọ, and Văn Đẩu wards were merged to form a new ward named Kiến An.
