= Nguyễn Đình Tấn =

Nguyễn Đình Tấn (Kiến An, Hải Phòng, 1930 - 28 January 2002) was a Vietnamese classical composer. He studied at the Tchaikovsky Conservatory. As an army officer in the cultural section he was entrusted with collection of folk songs such as Quan họ songs.

== Works ==
Songs

- "Lời thề sắt son", ('Iron Oath')
- "Tôi lắng nghe sông Đà gọi Thác Bà" ('I listen to the Black River calling Thác Bà falls')
- "Chim hót đâu xuân" ('Birds Singing in Early Spring')
- opera - Tình yêu của em ('My Love')
- symphonic poem - Emily, con! (Emily, my child) to the poem of Tố Hữu
- cantata - Thế hệ Hồ Chí Minh, thế hệ anh hùng (Generation of Ho Chi Minh, generation of heroes)
- symphony - Cây đuốc sống ('A Living Torch')
