= Mnong people =

Ethnic group from Vietnam and Cambodia

Mnong
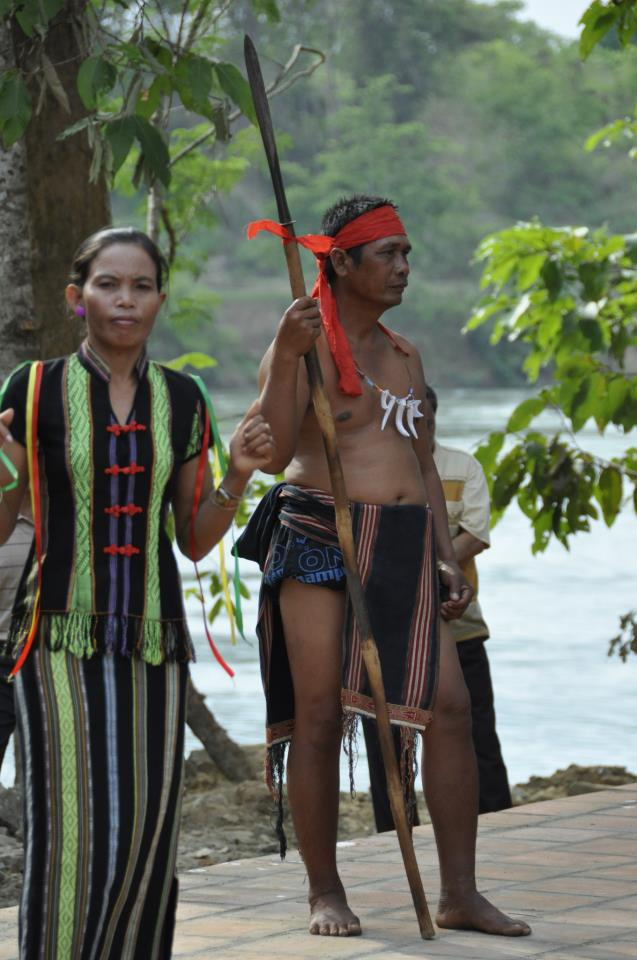
- Mnong people during an elephant blessing ceremony in Buôn Đôn, Vietnam

Total population
- Vietnam 127,334 (2019)

Regions with significant populations
- Vietnam (Đắk Lắk, Đắk Nông, Lâm Đồng, Bình Phước); Cambodia (Mondulkiri)

Languages
- Mnong, others

Religion
- Christian, Theravada Buddhism, Animist

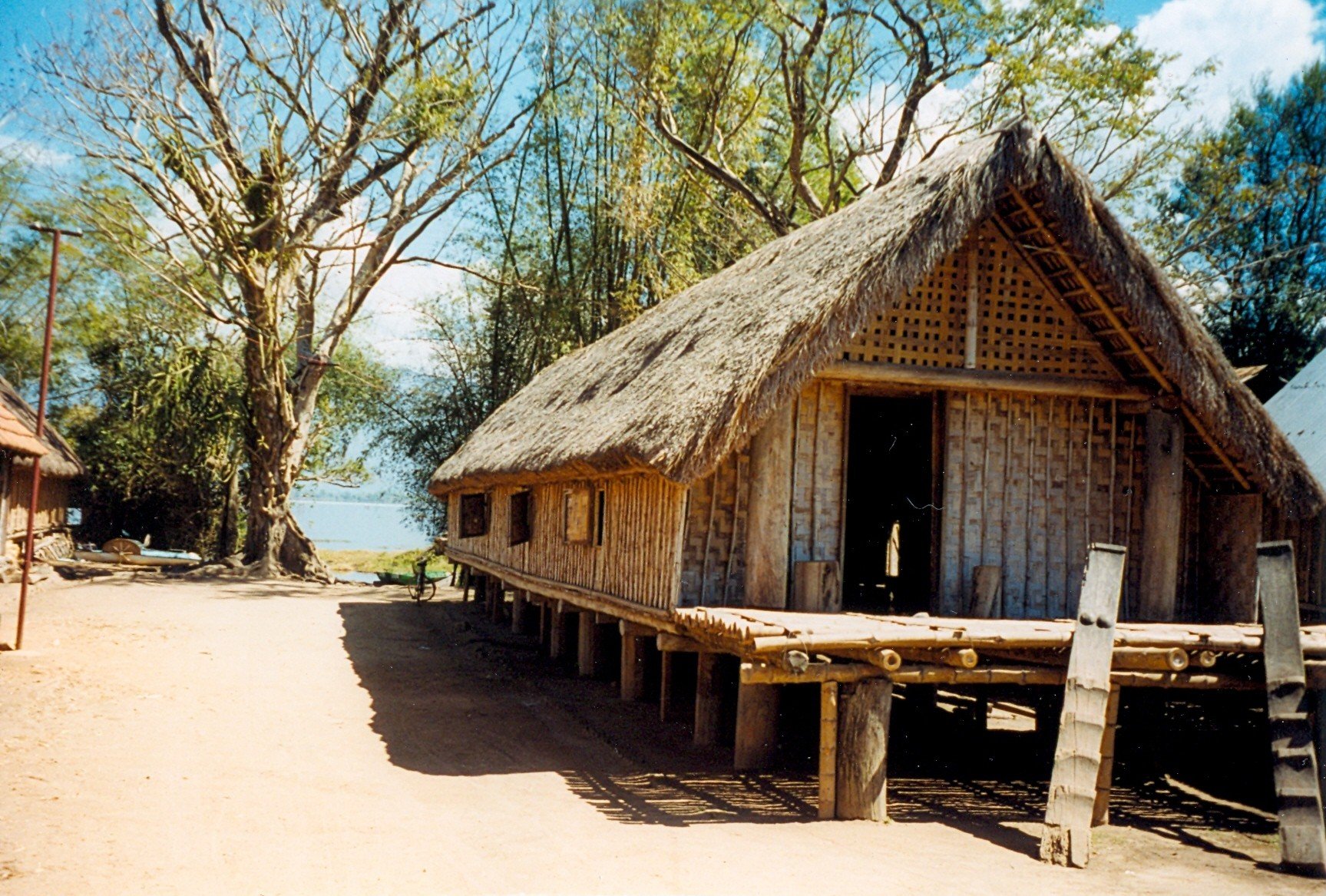
A longhouse in the Mnong village of Buôn Jun in the Central Highlands of Vietnam.

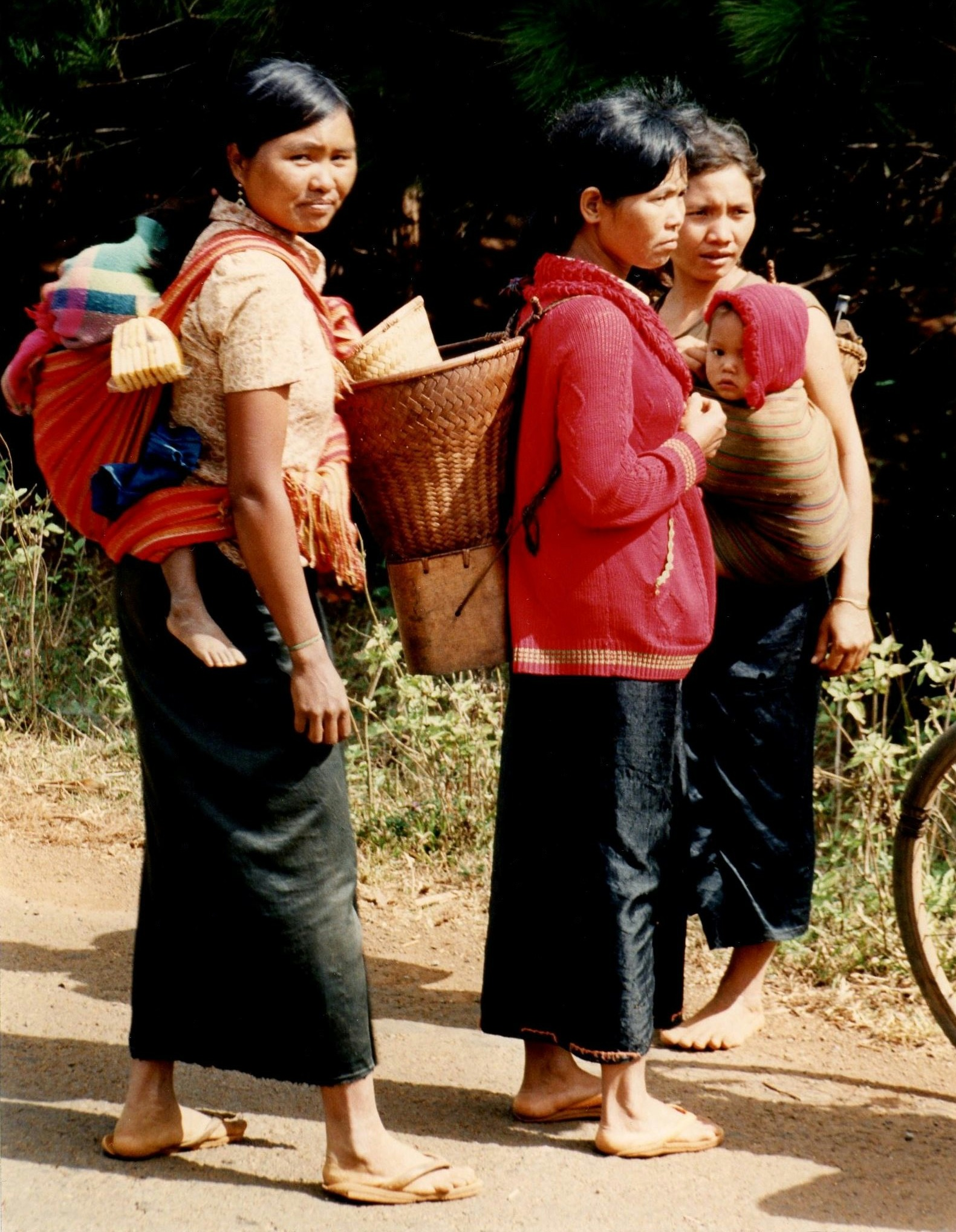
Mnong women near Buon Ma Thuot

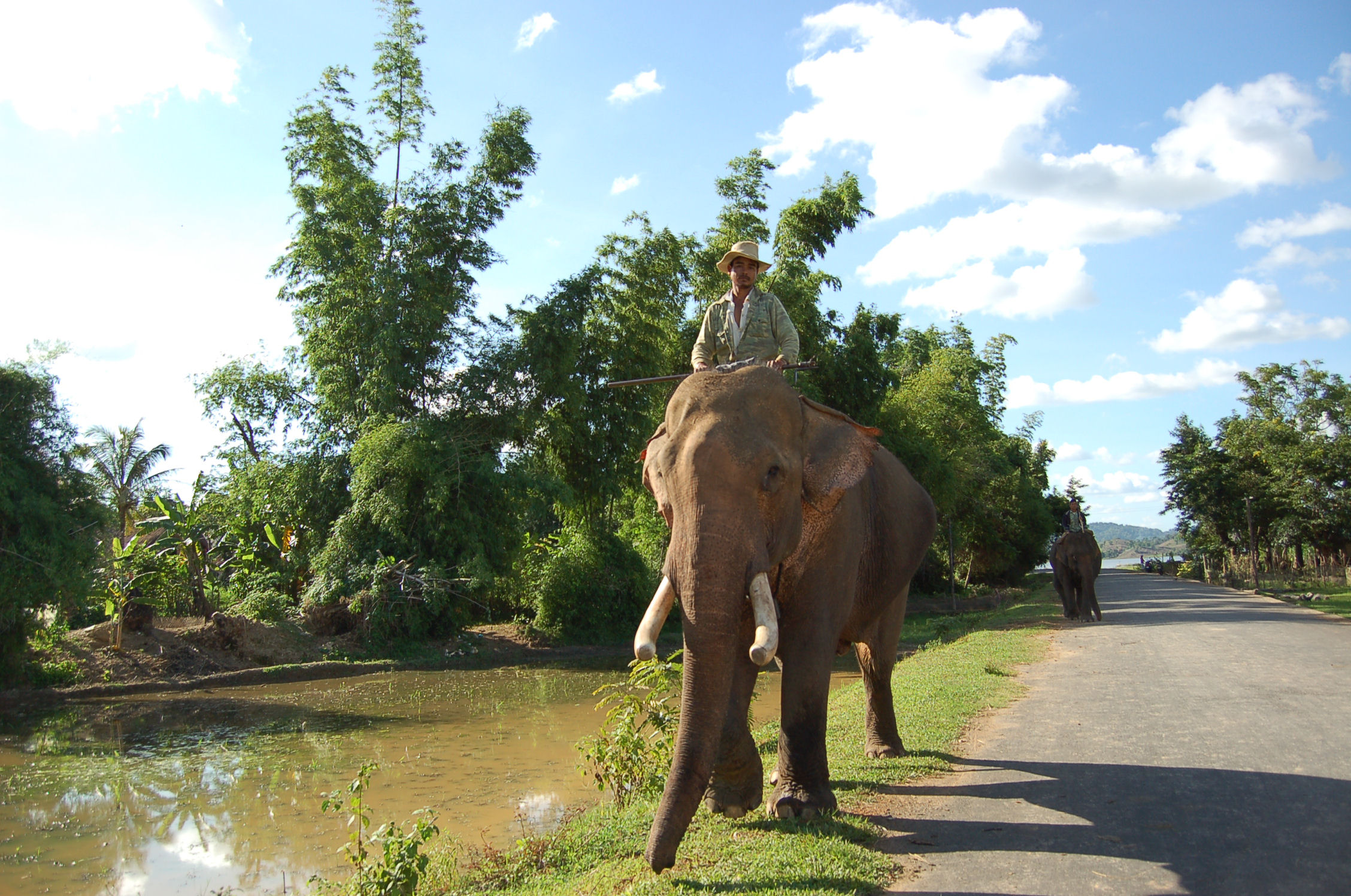
Mnong elephant carer

The Mnong or Munong people (Vietnamese: người Mơ-nông) are an ethnic group mainly living in the Central Highlands and Southeast regions of Vietnam, and the eastern regions of Cambodia. They are made up of two main groups: Western Mnong and Eastern Mnong. The Western Mnong include smaller groups such as: Bhiet (Bhiat), Bu-Neur, Rehong, Kong-Khang, Ksèh, Nong, Prèh, Tí-Prì, Perong, and Bu-Deung (Pou-Thong). The Eastern Mnong include: Gar, Briet, Kil (Chil), Krieng, Kesiong (Kyong), and Rlam (Rolum), living mainly in mountainous areas.

Every group speaks a variant of the Mnong language, which along with the Koho language, is in the South Bahnaric group of the Mon–Khmer family.

A large community with around 47,000 Mnong people live in Cambodia's northeastern boundary province of Mondulkiri, where they are known as Bunong (alternatively spelled Phnong, Punong, or Pnong).

== Culture ==
Epics (Mnong language: Ot N'rong - Ot: telling by singing, N'rong: old story) take an important part in Mnong people's life. Many of these epics, such as Con đỉa nuốt bon Tiăng (Mnong language: Ghu sok bon Tiăng, English: The leech swallows Tiăng village), or Mùa rẫy bon Tiăng (English: The farming season of Tiăng village) are quite long.

== Notable people ==
- Y Thu Knul (1828 – 1938), a Laos - Mnong person, a chieftain who established Buôn Đôn, a famous elephant hunting and taming village in Central Highlands. Y Thu Knul caught over 400 wild elephant in his life. In 1861, he caught a white elephant and gave it as a present to the Thai royal family, leading the king of Thailand to bestow upon him the name "Khunjunob" (literally "King of Elephant hunters").
- N'Trang Lơng, also known as Pa-Trang-Loeng, a tribal chief who led villagers against French colonizers in a 24 year uprising from 1912 to 1935. One of the most well-known actions of N'Trang Lơng was the assassination of Henri Maitre - a French writer and explorer - who was famous for the adventure book Les Jungles Moï (English: Montagnard in Jungle, Vietnamese: Rừng Người Thượng), as well as brutal actions against the Mnong people.
- Điểu Kâu (an ethnologist), Điểu Klứt and Điểu Klung (two epic tellers), are three brothers who collected, recorded and spread M'nong epics. In August 2008, folk artist Điểu Kâu died of old age. This was a great loss for the M'nong people because they consider Điểu Kâu to be the keeper of their cultural identity.

== See also ==
- Pnong people
- Funan
