= Kiến An district =

Coordinates: 20.806°N 106.639°E

Kiến An was a former urban district (quận) of Hai Phong, the third largest city of Vietnam.

== Notable people ==
- Nguyễn Đình Tấn, Vietnamese classical composer
