= Văn Thân movement =

19th century popular movement in Vietnam

The Văn Thân Movement (Nôm: 風潮文紳; quốc ngữ: Phong trào Văn Thân) was a popular movement led by non-governmental scholars in 19th century central Vietnam. Their motto was "Demolish the Westerners; kill the heretics" (i.e. Christians) (Chinese characters: 平西杀左; quốc ngữ: "Bình Tây sát tả") in order to preserve Vietnam and Vietnamese Confucian culture. Supporters took issue with the changes occurring in Vietnam because:

- Vietnamese society had been stagnating for centuries. The Văn Thân were conservatives who longed to uphold tradition and rejected the new western influence.
- The Văn Thân studied only Confucius' teachings and related fields. Their livelihood was tied to Confucianism, thus the new change brought economic hardship to them.

The Văn Thân blamed the Emperor and the pacifists of Vietnam for the Treaty of Saigon, which ceded three provinces and one island to the French.

== History ==
It started in 1862 following the Treaty of Saigon in which Saigon, the island of Poulo Condor and three southern provinces later known as the Cochinchina colony (Bien Hoa, Gia Dinh, and Dinh Tuong), were ceded to France. Later on, in 1885, it joined the Cần Vương movement. However, some reports state that the movement was later expelled from the Cần Vương insurgency due to its brutality toward Christians.

The Văn Thân Movement is often referred to as the Scholar's Revolt or Scholar's Rebellion. 'Văn' (文) literally means "writing" in Sino-Vietnamese; meanwhile, 'Thân' (紳) means a girdle worn by bureaucrats in East Asian cultural sphere in feudal age and thus metonymically, a bureaucrat. Taken as a whole, 'Văn Thân' 文紳 indicated the class of educated individuals who acted in this campaign.

== 1864 ==
The Văn Thân boycotted the examination and claimed the Christians were stockpiling weapons, training with them, and forcing people into Christianity.

The Văn Thân began plans to kill pacifists, force the emperor to follow their way or be forcefully removed from the throne, kill Christians, then take back ceded territory. The plan was exposed and the leaders were persecuted. Despite this, the rumor that Christians were stockpiling weapons scared the government enough to investigate. Ultimately, no evidence was found from these rumors, and the emperor declared the Christians innocents.

=== 1865 - 1884 ===
Văn Thân movements attacked Christian villages in Nghệ Tĩnh while pro-Văn Thân officials ignored the attacks.

Christian villages with pro-French army pastors (who were often French born) tended to be attacked more brutally than villages with non-partisan pastors. Places with French pastors were more likely to receive protection from the French Army, causing many villages with native pastors to protect themselves.

=== 1885 ===
The Cần Vương Movement started, which many people of the Văn Thân Movement claimed to follow. Activities among the Văn Thân increased.

A notable revolutionary Phan Đình Phùng, proclaimed 'religious equality', but this idea did not become popular.

== Legacy ==
The Vietnamese government took no official stance on Văn Thân. Schools rarely teach this movement.

Modern historians often consider Văn Thân a misguided nationalist movement, as it failed to fight against the French or unify Vietnamese people. Instead the movement's priority on preserving Confucian values ended up pushing the Christians toward the French.
