= Nam Nung =

Commune in Đắk Nông province, Vietnam

Nam Nung Xã Nâm Nung
- Commune
- Interactive map of Nam Nung
- Country: Vietnam
- Region: Central Highlands
- Province: Lâm Đồng province

Area
  - Total: 104.82 km^{2} (40.47 sq mi)

Population (2019)
  - Total: 3,586
- Time zone: UTC+7 (Indochina Time)

Nam Nung (Xã Nâm Nung) is a commune located in the southern part of Lâm Đồng province, in Vietnam's Central Highlands region. As of 2019, the commune covers an area of 104.82 km² and has a population of 3,586.

== History ==
The historical roots of Nam Nung are associated with indigenous settlements that predate formal administrative structuring under the modern Vietnamese state. During the 1912–1935 Ethnic Rebellion of Cambodia, which involved Cambodian and highland tribal groups resisting French colonial control, the area now known as Nam Nung was their doman, with a hidden base shrouded by the forest and mountain. The territory was the site of multiple battles, including a failed 1933 siege by the French and the successful 1935 siege which ended the war.

While Cambodia and Vietnam had not yet achieved independence at the time, the region saw considerable unrest and cross-border movements.

Following independence, the government of Vietnam implemented administrative reforms that significantly altered the region’s boundaries and governance. According to Decision 13-HĐBT issued by the Council of Ministers on 17 January 1984, Nam Nung commune was split into two separate communes: Nam Nung and Dak Ro.

On 9 November 1987, the Krông Nô district was officially established, and Nam Nung became part of this new administrative unit.

Later, on 29 August 2003, under Decree 100/2003/NĐ-CP, the government further adjusted the boundaries by creating Nam N'Dir commune, formed from 14,409 hectares of Nam Nung and encompassing a population of 5,154. This significantly reduced Nam Nung's size and population.

On 27 June 2019, Nam Nung was officially recognized by the Vietnamese government as a "safe zone," a designation typically reserved for areas deemed stable and free of major conflict or disturbances.

Following all adjustments, Nam Nung currently covers 7,726 hectares (approximately 77.26 km²) and is home to 3,586 residents.

== See also ==
- Krông Nô district
- Đắk Nông province
- Central Highlands (Vietnam)
