= Léopold Sabatier =

Léopold Sabatier (died c. 1929) was a French colonial administrator in the province of Darlac (now Đắk Lắk Province). He was province chief and later résident of the province from 1914 to 1926, after serving temporarily in Kontum. Sabatier died soon after his return to France in 1929.

== Personal life ==
Sabatier had relationships with several E De women, which led some E De elders to complain that he slept with too many E De girls. His daughter H'ni was born in 1923. She later followed him to France.

== Policies ==
During his time in Kontum (at least), Sabatier had serious doubts about missionary influence and sometimes had disputes with missionaries who used coercion to enforce rules or convert locals to Catholicism.

Under Sabatier's rule of Đắk Lắk, the Franco-Rhadé School opened and there were efforts to create an alphabet for the E De language. In 1923 an E De court was established, which incorporated elements of E De legal procedure

Sabatier tried to keep outsiders, especially French business groups and Vietnamese (Kinh) migrants out of Đắk Lắk to protect the interests of the locals. At the same time, improvements in infrastructure made the province more accessible.

== Criticism ==
In both Saigon and Paris, Sabatier was criticized by commercial circles for his policy of keeping business interests out of Đắk Lắk. His reputation among missionaries was also bad.
