= Tuy Đức =

Tuy Đức Xã Tuy Đức
- Rural commune
- Tuy Đức commune
- Location within Vietnam
- Coordinates: 12°12′49″N 107°27′57″E
- Country: Vietnam
- Region: Central Highlands
- Province: Lâm Đồng
- Time zone: UTC+7 (UTC + 7)

Tuy Đức is a rural commune (xã) of Lâm Đồng Province, Vietnam. It is one of the 124 new wards, communes and special zones of the province following the reorganization in 2025.

Tuy Đức Commune was established on June 16, 2025, under Resolution No. 1656/NQ-UBTVQH15 of the Standing Committee of the National Assembly, on the basis of the merger of the entire natural area and population of Quảng Tâm, Đắk R’Tih, and Đắk Búk So communes (Tuy Đức district).
