= Bunong people =

Bunong
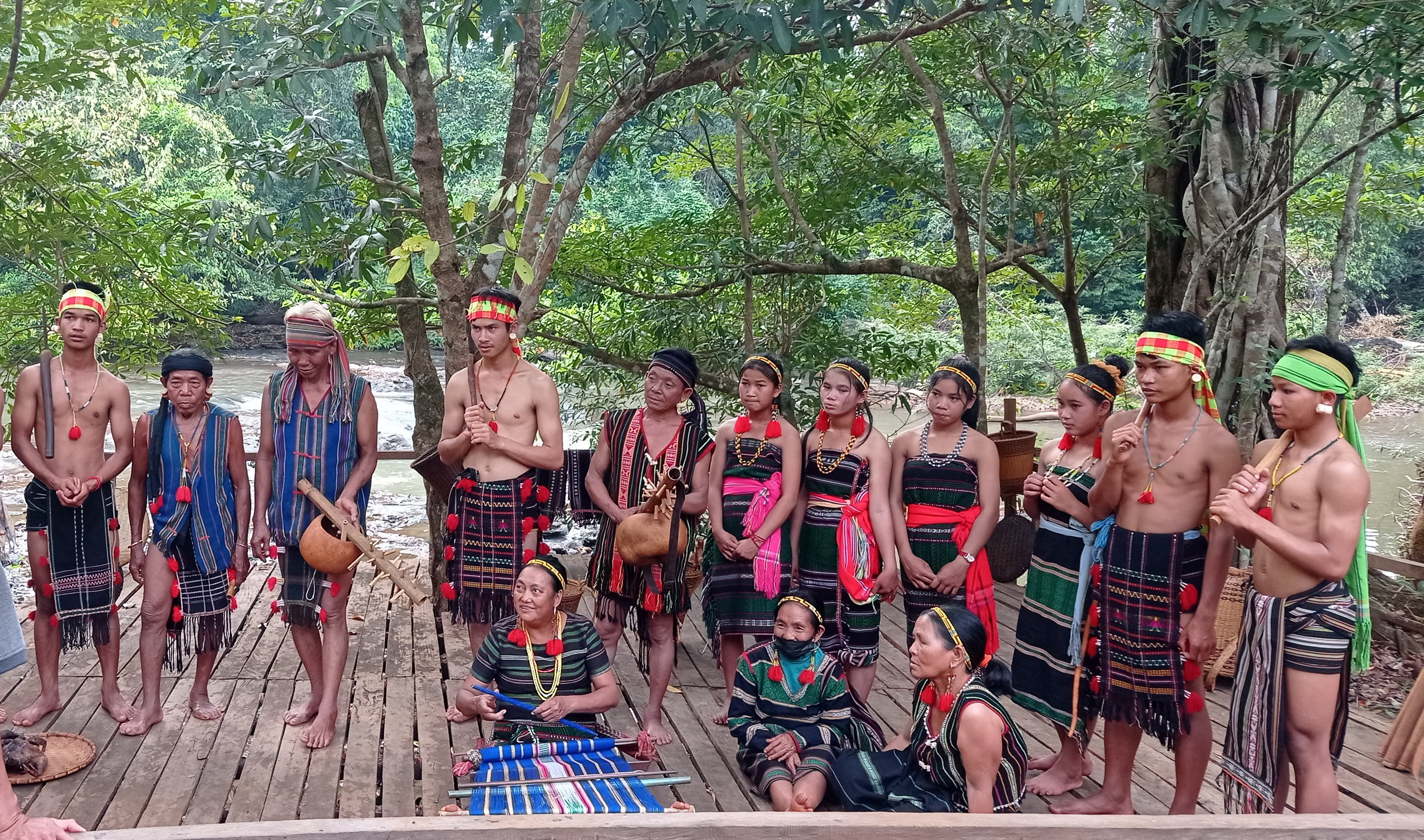
- A group of Bunong people in traditional and ceremonial clothing

Total population
- 37,500

Regions with significant populations
- Mondulkiri and Ratanakiri (Cambodia)

Languages
- Bunong

Religion
- Animist (majority), Roman Catholic, Protestant, Theravada Buddhism

Related ethnic groups
- Khmer Loeu, Khmers, Stieng

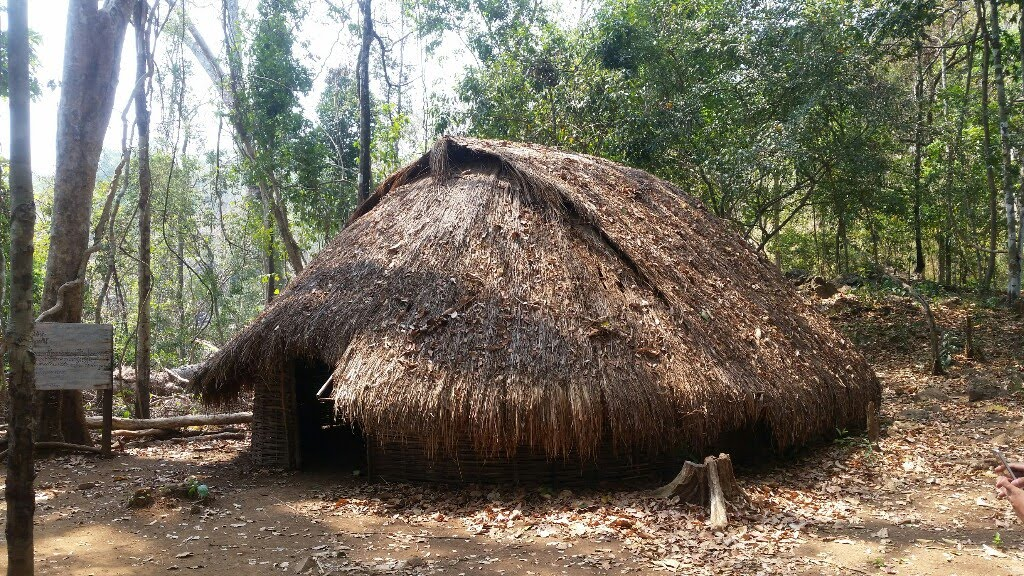
Traditional Bunong house with thatched grass roof and flattened bamboo walls.

The Bunong (alternatively Phnong, Punong, or Pnong) is an indigenous ethnic group in Cambodia. They are found primarily in Mondulkiri and Ratanakiri in Cambodia. The Bunong is the largest indigenous highland ethnic group in Cambodia. They have their language called Bunong, which belongs to Bahnaric branch of Austroasiatic languages. The majority of Bunong people are animists, but a minority of them follows Christianity (Evangelical Protestantism or Roman Catholicism) and Theravada Buddhism. After Cambodia's independence in 1953, Prince Sihanouk created a novel terminology, referring to the country's highland inhabitants, including the Bunong, as Khmer Loeu ("upland Khmer"). Under the People's Republic of Kampuchea (1979–89), the generic term ជនជាតិភាគតិច (chuncheat pheaktech) "ethnic minorities" came to be in use and the Bunong became referred to as ជនជាតិព្នង (chuncheat pnong) meaning "ethnic Pnong". Today, the generic term that many Bunong use to refer to themselves is ជនជាតិដើមភាគតិច (chuncheat daem pheaktech), which can be translated as "indigenous minority" and involves special rights, notably to collective land titles as an "indigenous community". In Vietnam, Bunong-speaking peoples are recurrently referred to as Mnong.

== Language ==
Bunong language (sometimes spelled 'Mnong') is the native language of the Bunong people. It is a member of Bahnaric branch of Austroasiatic languages and is distantly related to Khmer and other languages spoken in the Cambodian highlands (excluding Jarai and Rade which are Austronesian languages closely related to Cham). There are several dialects of Bunong, some even recognised as a distinct language by linguists; most Bunong dialects are spoken in neighbouring Vietnam, except for Kraol which is spoken within Cambodia.

== Culture ==
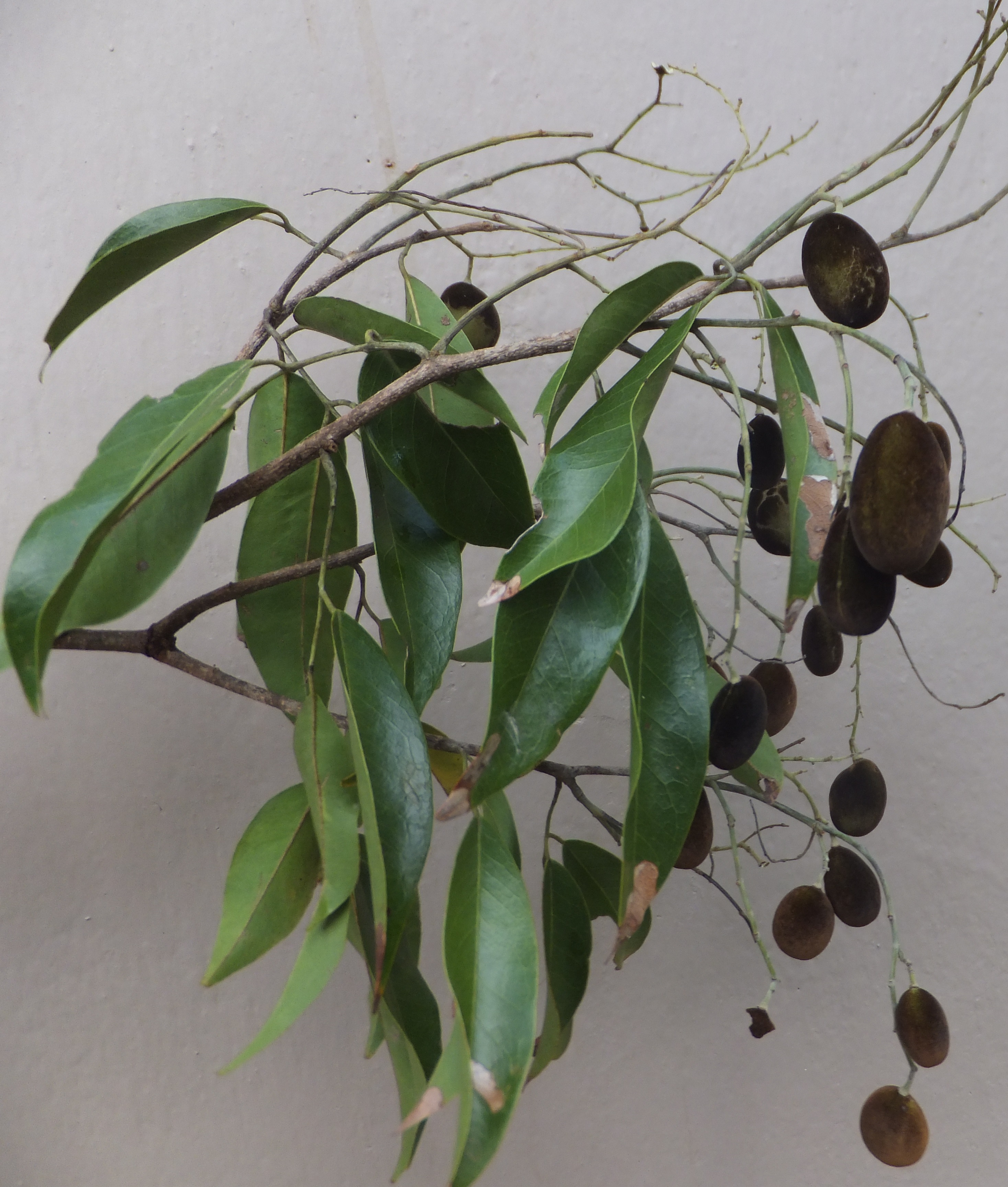
Dialium cochinchinense (velvet tamarind) or Kalagn in Mnong is part of Bunong traditional medicine. The tree is native to Mondulkiri Province where it is threatened by habitat loss.

The Bunong practice a very diverse, dynamic, unstructured and often secretive traditional medicine. Originally tied to the large biodiversity of their forest environment, the wars of the 1970s had a significant impact on the Bunong culture and knowledge of traditional medicine, when everybody relocated to either Vietnam or the Cambodian Koh Niek district. New plants and practices were acquired by the Bunong in these new locations, but upon returning in the 1980s and 1990s, knowledge and use of plants native to their homelands had been forgotten by many. Adequate conventional biomedicine and healthcare can be difficult or impossible to obtain by the locals in the countryside of Cambodia - in particular during the rainy season - and it is therefore official policy of the Cambodian government (backed by the WHO) to support the practice of traditional medicines. Research shows that, as of 2011, 95% of the inhabitants in two Bunong villages still regularly use medicinal plants. It is hoped that the Bunong culture of traditional medicine can help to build respect for the environment and halt the deforestation and habitat loss of Cambodia on a local level.

=== Traditional agriculture ===
Highland rice varieties formed a staple for the Bunong, grown in slash-and-burn or swidden plots called 'mir'. These are typically on valley slopes. These plots are used for up to 5 years before being left to regrow into forest, recovering soil fertility and allowing use again in the future. Rice was traditionally supplemented with other items gathered from the forest including vegetables, plants, roots, and honey. Over the last two decades, there has been an increasing shift to cash crop cultivation in Bunong communities, especially cassava and cashew.

=== Spirit practices and religion ===
Bunong traditionally relate to spirit-gods (brah-yaang) who live in surrounding forests, on mountains, or in rivers. The Bunongs' world is populated by spirits with whom people interact through rituals, offering them jar wine and sacrificed animals. No spirits are more powerful than those of the Spirit Forests.” - Chok Marel Ancestors also hold an important place in Bunong ritual life and, like the spirit-gods, they are called to join every ceremony. During Vietnam war, in the early 1970s, a number of Bunong converted to Christianity during their exile in South Vietnamese refugee camps. In more recent years, Christian missionaries of many different denominations have been trying to spread their religion in Mondulkiri, notably through concurrent development support. Bunong spirit practices have also been blended with Khmer Buddhism through proximity.

== Documentation ==
=== Documentary movies ===
- Bunong guu oh / Bunong's birth practices: between tradition and change (2011) by Tommi Mendel and Brigitte Nikles http://www.tigertoda.ch/BUNONG_GUU_OH.html
- The last refuge (2013) by Anne-Laure Porée and Guillaume Suon https://bophana.org/productions/the-last-refuge/
- Last of the Elephant Men (2015) by Arnaud Bouquet and Daniel Ferguson
- Mirr (2016) by Mehdi Sahebi http://www.mirr.ch/
- We Are the Fruits of the Forest (Nous Sommes les Fruits de la Forêt) (2025) by Rithy Panh
- The Land Looters (Pilleurs de Terre) (2026) by Fanny Escobar https://www.imdb.com/title/tt39163863/

== See also ==
- Mnong people
- Austroasiatic carrying basket known in Mondolkiri as kapha
