= Krông Nô district =

Coordinates: 12.333°N 107.833°E

Krông Nô district Huyện Krông Nô
- District
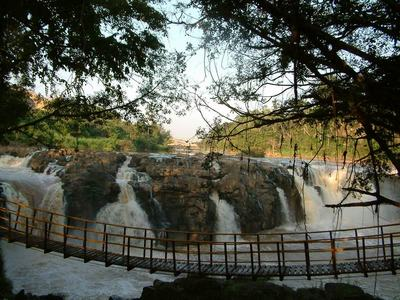
- Dray Sap Falls

- Seal
- Interactive map of Krông Nô district
- Country: Vietnam
- Region: Central Highlands
- Province: Đắk Nông
- Capital: Đắk Mâm

Area
  - Total: 315 sq mi (817 km^{2})

Population (2018)
  - Total: 70,003
- Time zone: UTC+7 (Indochina Time)

Krông Nô is a former rural district of Đắk Nông province in the Central Highlands region of Vietnam.

== History ==
Its name Krông-nô means "the river of the father" in Mnong language. It is named after the largest river flowing through the rural district: Eă Krông-knô (the falls of the father river), Daàk Krông-knô (the stream of the father river).

The total basin area of the river is 3,934 km^{2}, with a length of up to 160 km. The reason it is called like that is because from the top of the Cư-yàng-sin Mountain, there are two rivers—Krông-knô (father river) and Krông-ana (mother river). The two then continued to enter another river, Krông-srêpốk (son river).

== Geography ==
As of 2020 the rural district had a population of 81,821. The district covers an area of 813,49 km^{2}.

The district capital lies at Đắk Mâm Township. Besides, it also includes 11 communes: Buôn Choáh, Đắk Đrô, Đắk Năng, Đắk Sôr, Đức Xuyên, Nam Đà, Nam Xuân, Nâm N'Đir, Nâm Nung, Quảng Phú, Tân Thành.

== See also ==
- Krông Ana district
