= Ea Súp district =

Coordinates: 13.167°N 107.750°E

Ea Sup district Huyện Ea Súp
- District
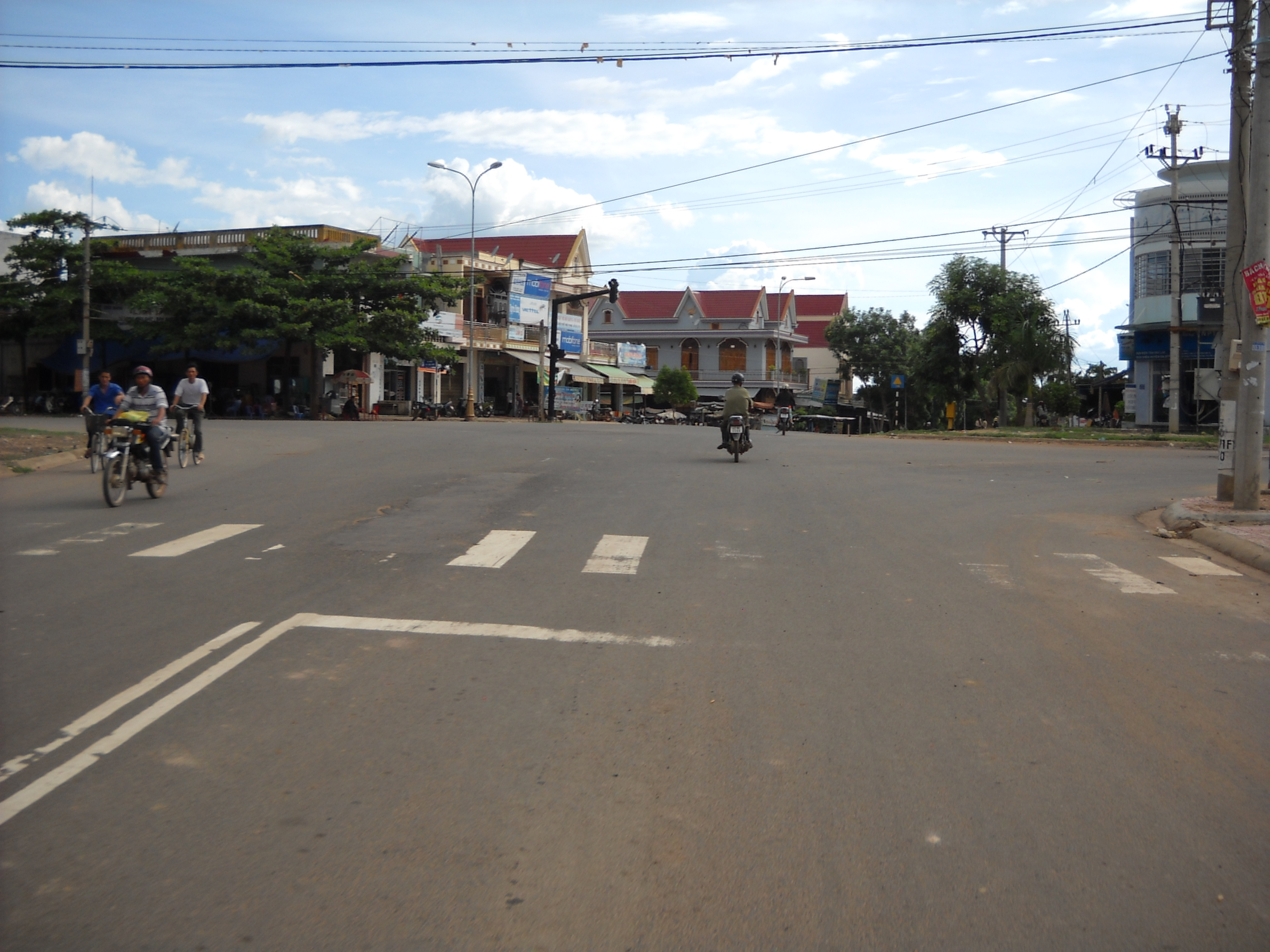
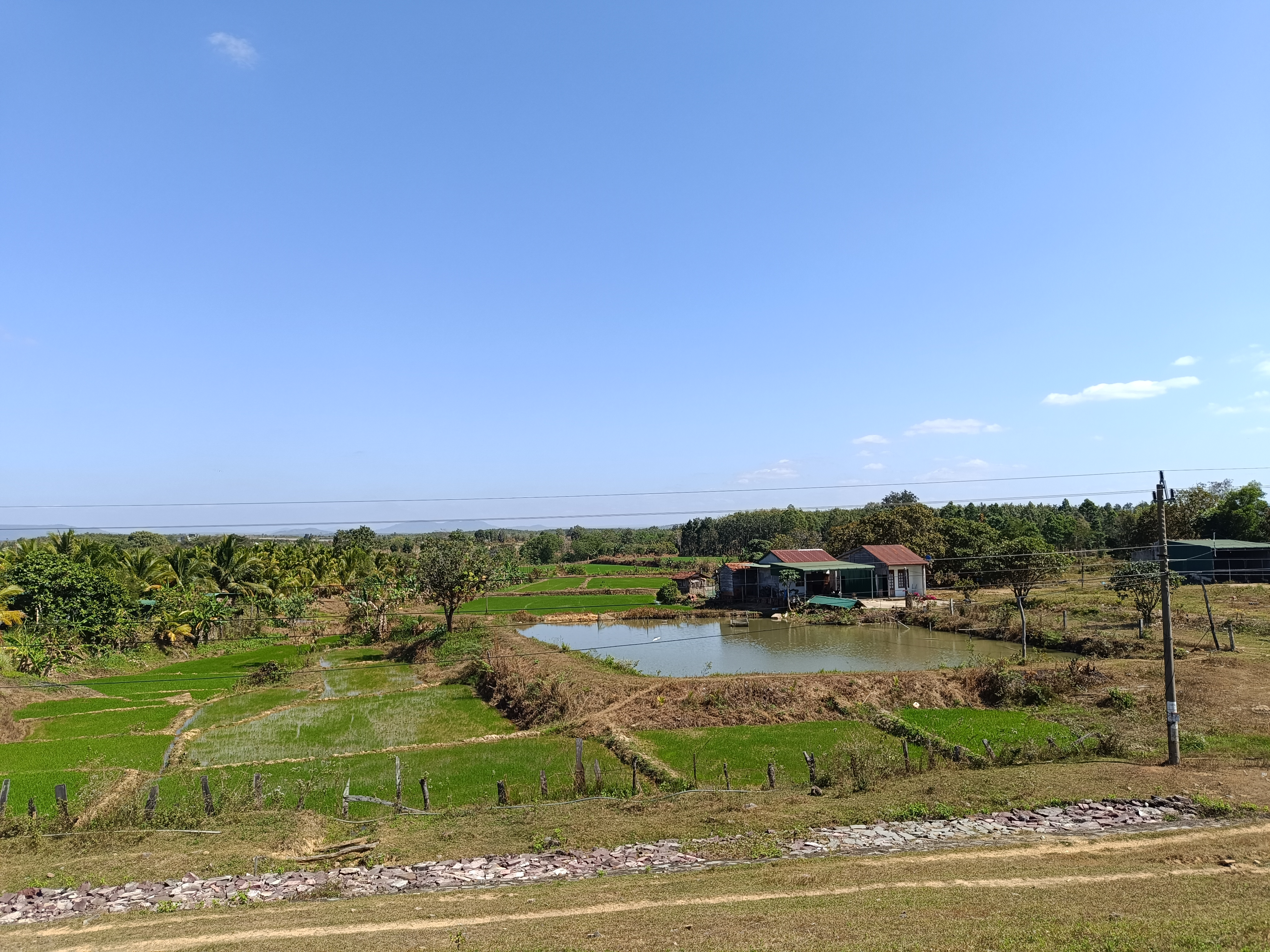
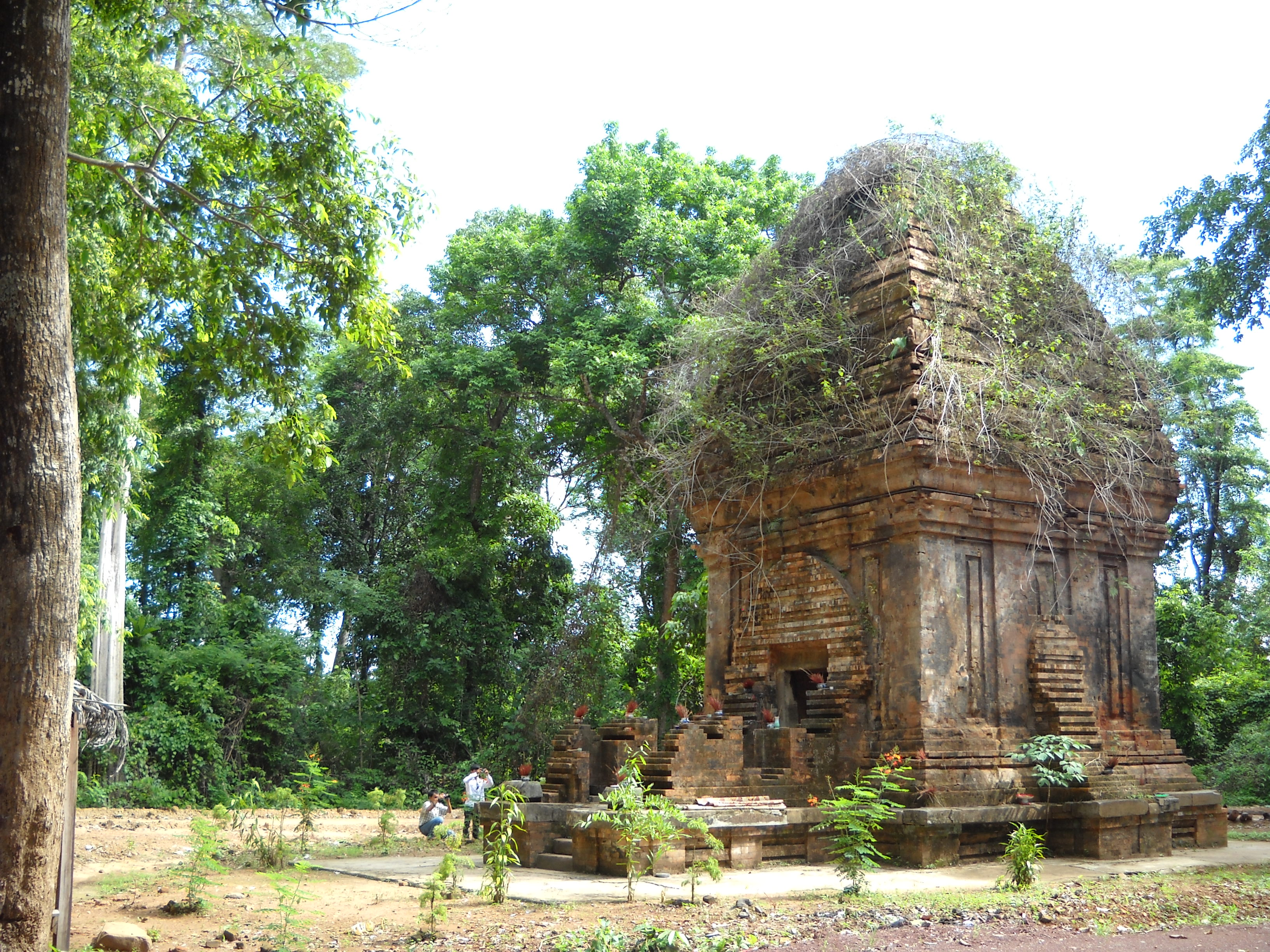
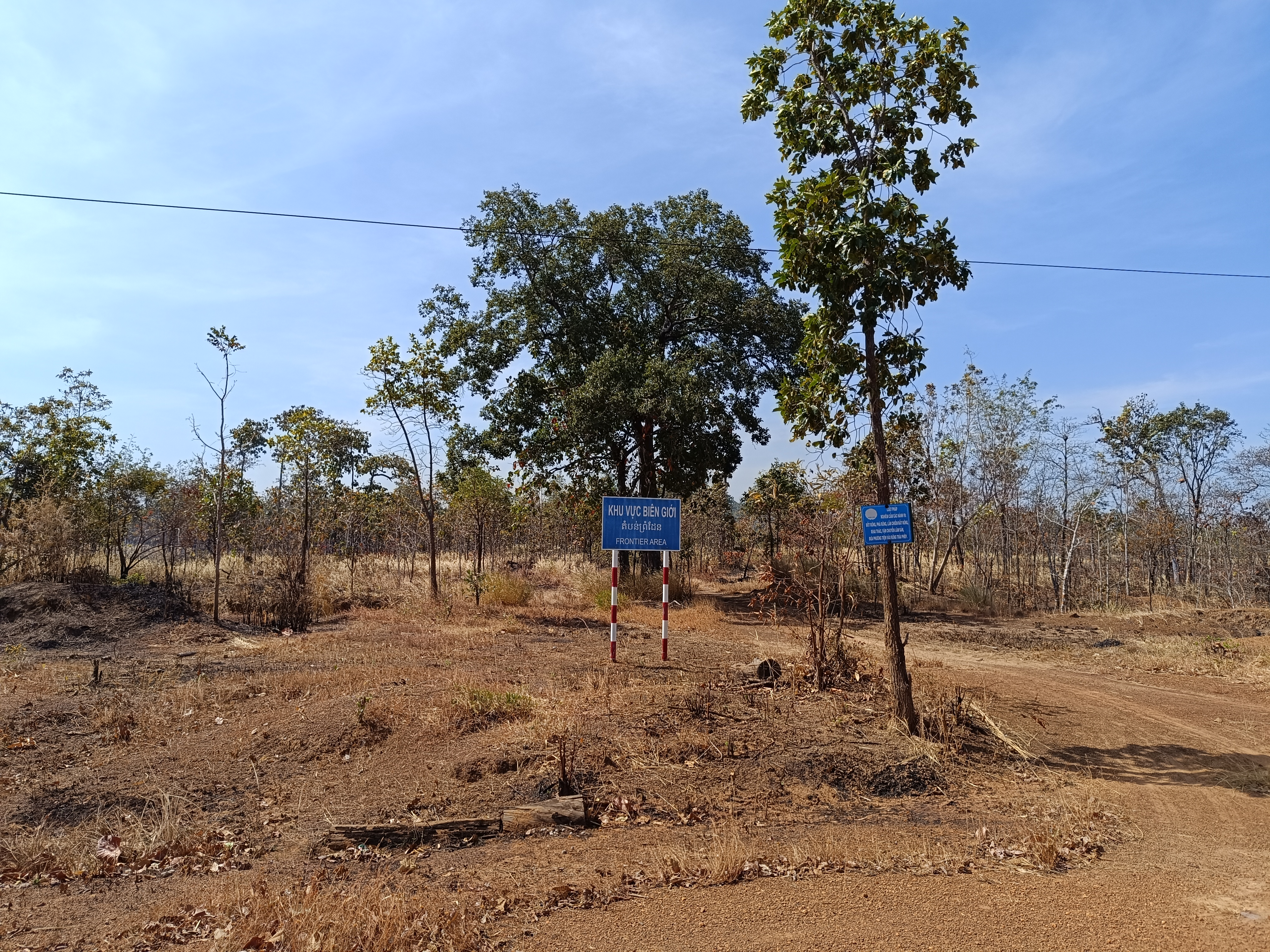
- Street view in Ea Súp Landscape in Ea Súp Yang Prong Tower in Ea Rốk Frontier area in Ia Lốp

- Seal
- Interactive map of Ea Sup district
- Country: Vietnam
- Region: Central Highlands
- Province: Đắk Lắk
- Capital: Ea Súp

Area
  - Total: 680 sq mi (1,750 km^{2})

Population (2018)
  - Total: 64,564
- Time zone: UTC+7 (Indochina Time)

Ea Súp is an old, rural district (huyện) of Đắk Lắk province in the Central Highlands region of Vietnam.

== Geography ==
As of 2003 the district had a population of 40,164. The district covers an area of 1,750 km^{2}. The district capital is Ea Súp.

The district has the following geographical boundaries:

- To the east, it borders Ea H'leo district and Cư M'gar district
- To the west, it borders Cambodia
- To the south, it borders Buôn Đôn district
- To the north, it borders Chư Prông district and Chư Pưh district of Gia Lai province

== Administrative divisions ==
It contains one township, Ea Súp, and nine communes:

- Cư Kbang
- Cư M'Lan
- Ea Bung
- Ea Lê
- Ea Rốk
- Ia Jlơi
- Ia Lốp
- Ia Rvê
- Ya Tờ Mốt
