= Ea Bar =

Ea Bar may refer to several places in Vietnam, including:

- Ea Bar, Đắk Lắk, a rural commune of Buôn Đôn District
- Ea Bar, Phú Yên, a rural commune of Sông Hinh District
