= Krông Ana district =

Coordinates: 12.500°N 108.083°E

Krông Ană district Huyện Krông Ană
- Rural district
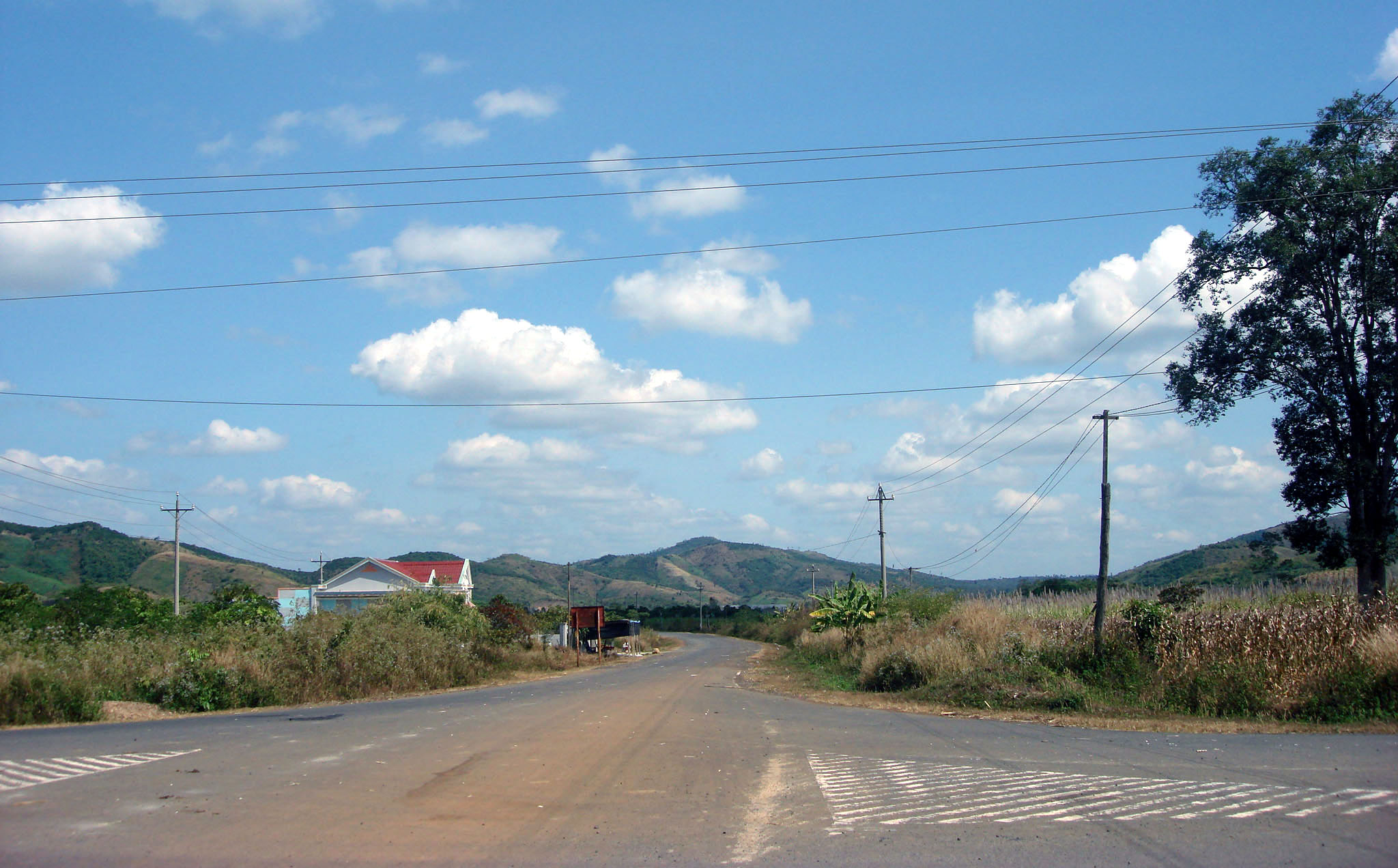
- A highland village in Dray Sáp commune
- Nickname: "Loveland" (Xứ-sở tình-yêu)
- Motto: "For love more green" (Cho tình-yêu thêm xanh)
- Interactive map of Krông Ană district
- Country: Vietnam
- Region: Central Highlands
- Province: Đắk Lắk province
- Capital: Buôn Trấp

Government
  - Type: District People's Committee
  - Chairman: Nguyễn Thanh Vũ
  - Party Committee's Secretary: H'Yâo Knul

Area
  - Total: 249 sq mi (645 km^{2})

Population (2003)
  - Total: 199,543
- Time zone: UTC+7 (Indochina Time)
- Website: Krongana.Daklak.gov.vn

Krông Ană is a former rural district of Đắk Lắk province in the Western Plateau of Vietnam.

== History ==
The name "Krông Ană" originated from the river of the same name. It means "the mother river" in Rhade language.

== Geography ==
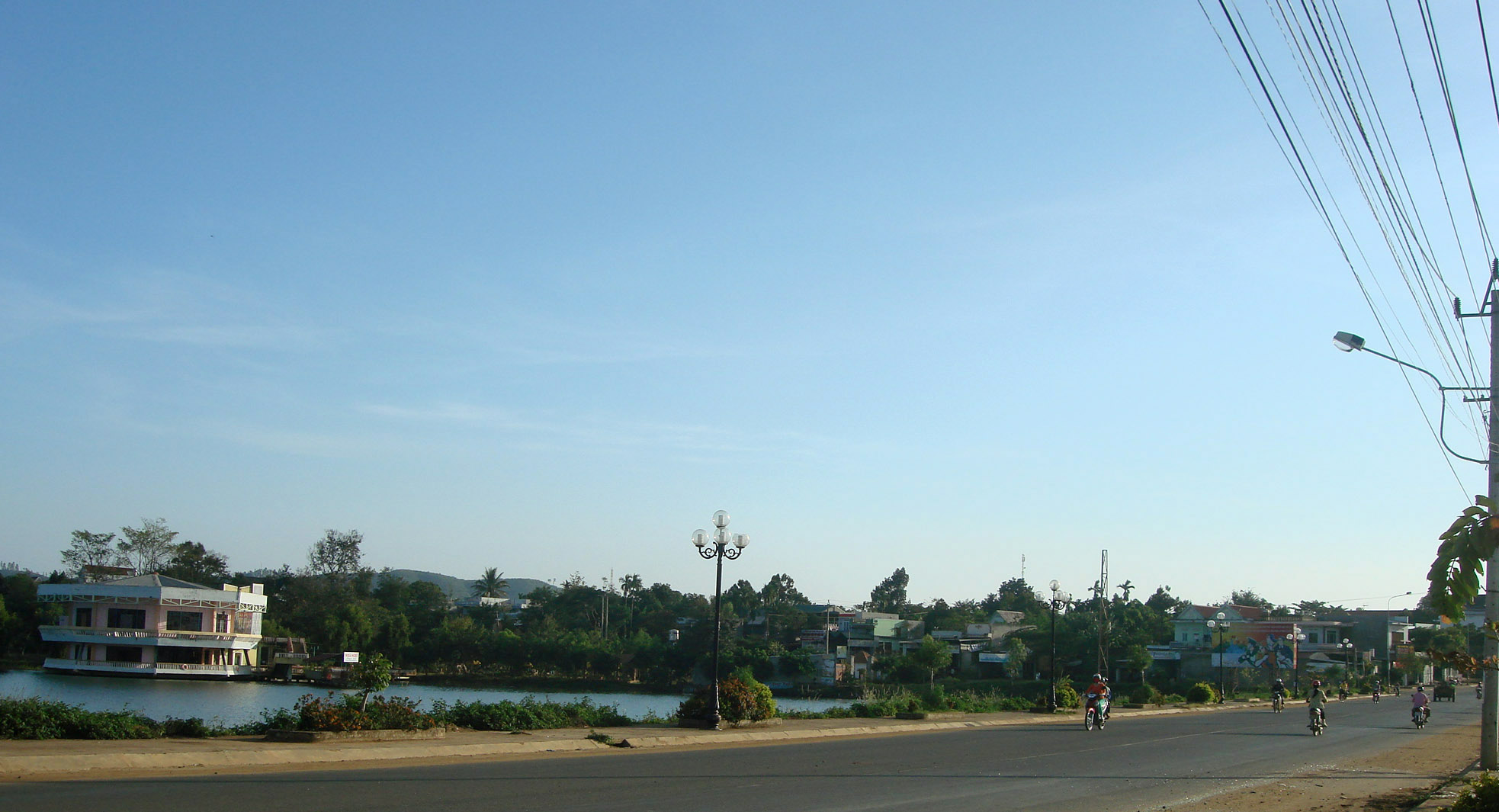
Landscape

As of 2003 the district had a population of 199,543.

The district covers an area of 645 km^{2} (249 sq mi).

The district capital lies at Buôn Trấp.

== See also ==
- Krông Nô district
- Krông Buk district
