= Srepok 1 (Vietnamese power plant) =

Srepok 1 is a solar power plant built on the land of Ea Wer commune, Buon Don district, Dak Lak province, Vietnam.

The Srepok 1 power plant has a capacity of 100 MWP installed. It construction was started in October 2018, and completed in March 2019. The power plant is built on an area of 120 hectares.

It is also close to the Srepok River, hence the name of the plant.

== Media coverage ==
Some newspapers, such as Tuoi Tre, etc. reported on the inauguration of the solar power plant on March 9, 2019, calling it "the largest solar power plant in Vietnam".

== See also ==
- List of solar power plants in Vietnam
