= Tân Hòa =

Tân Hòa may refer to several places in Vietnam, including:

- Tân Hòa, Buôn Ma Thuột, a ward of Buôn Ma Thuột in Đắk Lắk Province
- Tân Hòa, Biên Hòa, a ward of Biên Hòa
- Tân Hòa, Hòa Bình, a ward of Hòa Bình City
- Tân Hòa, Tiền Giang, a township and capital of Gò Công Đông District
- Tân Hòa, Hanoi, a commune of Quốc Oai District
- Tân Hòa, Vĩnh Long, a commune of Vĩnh Long
- Tân Hòa, Bà Rịa–Vũng Tàu, a commune of Phú Mỹ
- Tân Hòa, An Giang, a commune of Phú Tân District, An Giang Province
- Tân Hòa, Bình Phước, a commune of Đồng Phú District
- Tân Hòa, Buôn Đôn, a commune of Buôn Đôn District in Đắk Lắk Province
- Tân Hòa, Lai Vung, a commune of Lai Vung District in Đồng Tháp Province
- Tân Hòa, Thanh Bình, a commune of Thanh Bình District in Đồng Tháp Province
- Tân Hòa, Hậu Giang, a commune of Châu Thành A District
- Tân Hòa, Kiên Giang, a commune of Tân Hiệp District
- Tân Hòa, Lạng Sơn, a commune of Bình Gia District
- Tân Hòa, Bến Lức, a commune of Bến Lức District in Long An Province
- Tân Hòa, Tân Thạnh, a commune of Tân Thạnh District in Long An Province
- Tân Hòa, Tân Châu, a commune of Tân Châu District, Tây Ninh Province
- Tân Hòa, Hưng Hà, a commune of Hưng Hà District in Thái Bình Province
- Tân Hòa, Vũ Thư, a commune of Vũ Thư District in Thái Bình Province
- Tân Hòa, Thái Nguyên, a commune of Phú Bình District
- Tân Hòa, Trà Vinh, a commune of Tiểu Cần District

== See also ==
- Tân Hòa Đông and Tân Hòa Tây of Tân Phước District
- Tân Hóa, a commune and village in Minh Hóa District, Quảng Bình Province
- Tân Hoa, a commune and village in Lục Ngạn District, Bắc Giang Province
