= Krông Ana =

Coordinates: 12°29′N 108°01′E

- Commune
- Xã Krông Ana
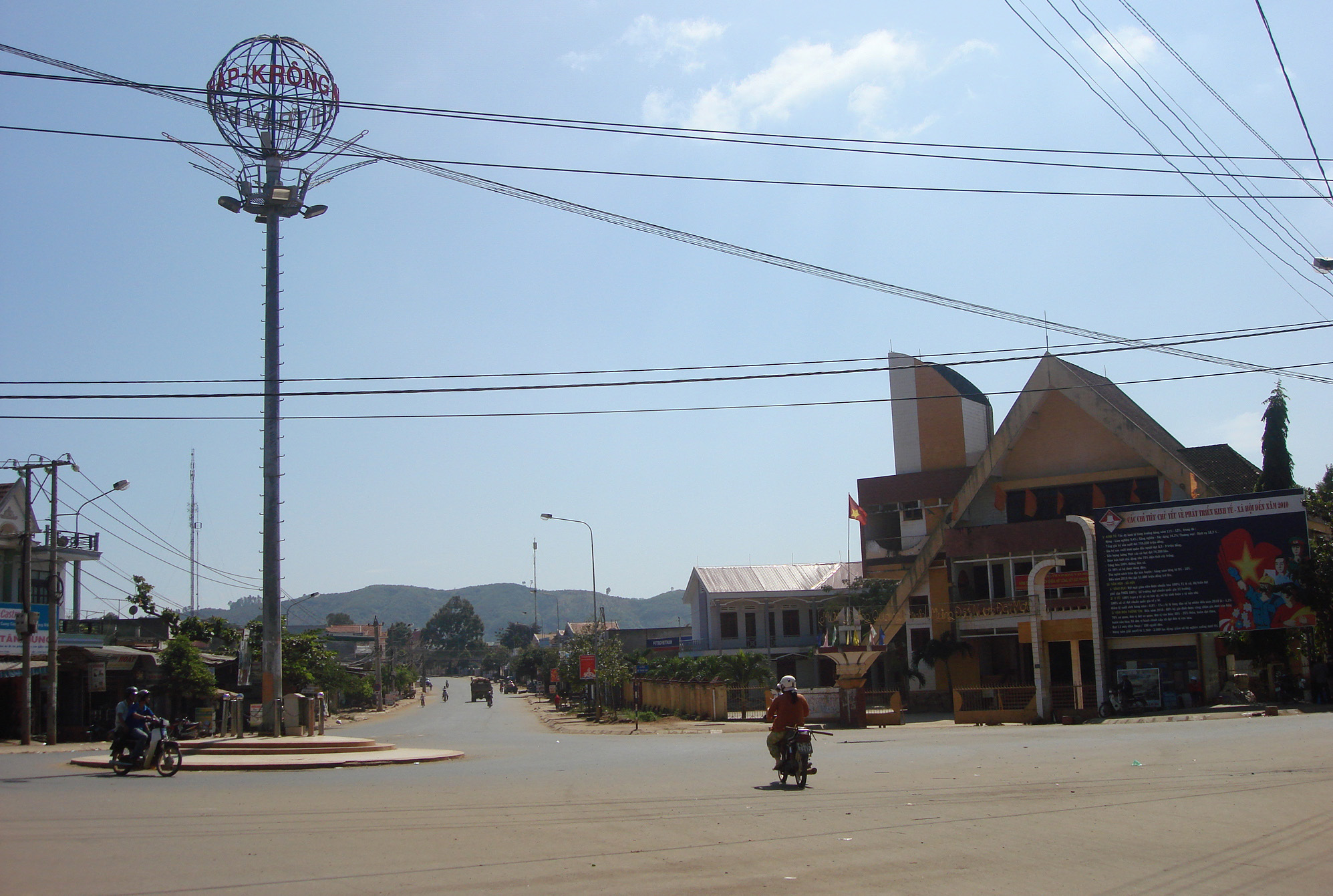
- Central roads in Buôn Trấp
- Interactive map of Krông Ana
- Country: Vietnam
- Region: Central Highlands
- Province: Đắk Lắk

Government
  - Type: Township People's Committee
  - Chairman: Trịnh Thành Đô
  - Party Committee's Secretary: Y Ter Buôn Krông

Area
  - Total: 30.47 km^{2} (11.76 sq mi)

Population (2010)
  - Total: 23,863
  - Density: 783/km^{2} (2,030/sq mi)
- Time zone: UTC+7 (UTC + 7)
- ZIP code: 64206
- Area code: 12°29′05″B 108°01′46″Đ
- Website: buontrap.krongana.daklak.gov.vn

Krông Ana is a commune of Đắk Lắk province, Vietnam. It is one of the 102 new wards and communes of the province following the reorganization in 2025.

On June 16, 2025, the Standing Committee of the National Assembly issued Resolution No. 1660/NQ-UBTVQH15 on the reorganization of commune-level administrative units in Đắk Lắk Province in 2025 (the resolution took effect on the date of its adoption). Accordingly, the entire natural area and population of Buôn Trấp Township, Bình Hòa Commune, and Quảng Điền Commune were reorganized into a new commune named Krông Ana Commune.

== History ==
In the Rade language, buôn trấp means "sunken village", presumably in reference to the area's low-lying, muddy terrain.

During the period of the Republic of Vietnam (1955–1975), Buôn Trấp, along with Êcăm and Rung, were small villages located on the outskirts of Ban Mê Thuột, Darlac province, in the 2nd Military Zone.

On March 5, 1977, according to Decision No. 14/TC of the Provisional Revolutionary People's Committee of Đắk Lắk province regarding administrative boundary adjustments and the establishment of three new communes of Buôn Ma Thuột town, the communes of Eă Bông, Eă Nă, and Quảng Điền were established. At that time, Buôn Trấp belonged to Eă Bông Commune.

On September 19, 1981, the Council of Ministers of Vietnam issued Decision No. 75/HĐBT on the reorganization of district boundaries in Đắk Lắk Province and Buôn Ma Thuột town, thereby establishing Krông Ana District. Buôn Trấp remained part of Eă Bông Commune within Krông Ana District.

On March 6, 1984, according to Decision No. 35-QĐ/HĐBT of the Council of Ministers, Eă Bông Commune was divided into three new administrative units: Eă Bông Commune, Dur Kmăl Commune, and Buôn Trấp Township.

The newly formed township area originally consisted of three merchant communities. With the implementation of the Đổi Mới policy, the area began to attract settlers who came to start businesses and develop agriculture. Among the first were people from within the province, such as the Mường from the Hòa Bình area and residents of Hòa Thắng Commune, Buôn Ma Thuột, who settled near the river to cultivate wet rice and established Phú Đức Village. Migrants from Huế, originally from Đạt Lý Village (now in Hòa Thuận Commune, Buôn Ma Thuột), settled near the lotus (now Hồ Sen) and reestablished Đạt Lý Village. Northern migrants, primarily from Thái Bình province, formed Quỳnh Tân Hamlet. From these settlements, three agricultural production groups were later established: Ward 7, Phú Đức, and Buôn Êcăm, which included immigrants from Thừa Thiên-Huế, Thái Bình, and Quảng Nam.

Due to its muddy terrain, which becomes flooded during the rainy season, Buôn Trấp has developed as an intensive farming area and plays an important role in stabilizing wet rice production throughout the Central Highlands region of Vietnam.

== Subdivisions ==
Buôn Trấp township is divided into 8 residential groups (tổ dân phố): 1, 2, 3, 4, 5, 6, 7, Buôn Trấp; 5 villages (thôn): 1, 2, Quỳnh Tân 1, Quỳnh Tân 2, Quỳnh Tân 3; and 2 buôns: Ê Căm, Rung.

== Geography ==
Buôn Trấp is located on the left bank of the Krông Ana River (also known as "the mother river"). To its south lies Cư Abao ("the snail mountain"), a mountain range that is mostly flat.

Over more than 40 years of development, Buôn Trấp has become home to a population that is approximately 80% Kinh people. Most belong to families of workers who migrated to the Buôn Trấp Forestry Farm to reclaim land beginning in 1981. The remaining population consists mainly of small groups from the Rhade and Raglai ethnic communities.

== Culture ==
Buôn Trấp's customs and cultural practices have been shaped by a large number of immigrants from northern Vietnam and the central coastal delta regions, resulting in a diverse and distinctive local culture. Over the 40 years since its establishment as a township, Buôn Trấp has developed from a simple forestry farm into one of the leading wet rice cultivation areas in the Central Highlands, adopting agricultural models and techniques from northwestern Vietnam.

The most notable tourist attraction in Buôn Trấp is the Hồ Sen Eco-tourism Area (Khu du lịch sinh thái Hồ Sen). Originally developed as part of the Hồ Sen Indigenous Cultural Complex project and managed by the Krông Ana district People's Committee beginning in 1988, the project initially proved ineffective. In August 2010, management and operations were transferred to Đại Hùng International JSC for renovation and further development.

Each year, on the fourth day of the Lunar New Year, a traditional boat racing festival is held at the lake. This festival originated from Quảng Nam immigrants who settled in the area.

During the COVID-19 pandemic, both the government and local residents of Buôn Trấp faced challenges related to waste pollution, an issue exacerbated by the expansion of tourism activities.
