= Yok Đôn National Park =

National park in Vietnam

- IUCN category II (national park)
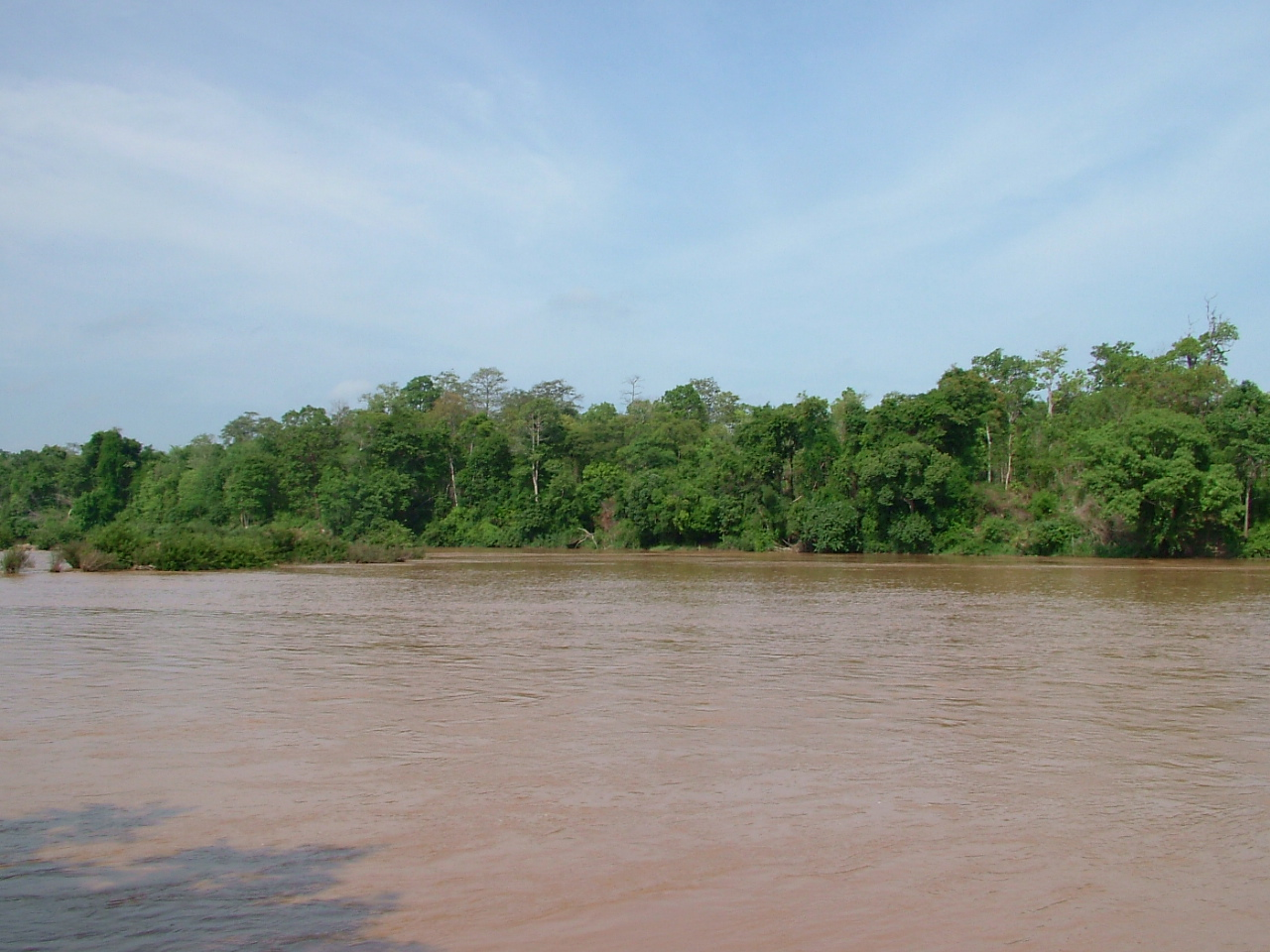
- Yok Don National Park

- Location within Vietnam
- Location: Đắk Lắk Province, Vietnam
- Coordinates: 12.80375719°N 107.67065465°E
- Area: 1,155.45 km^{2} (446.12 sq mi)
- Established: 1986

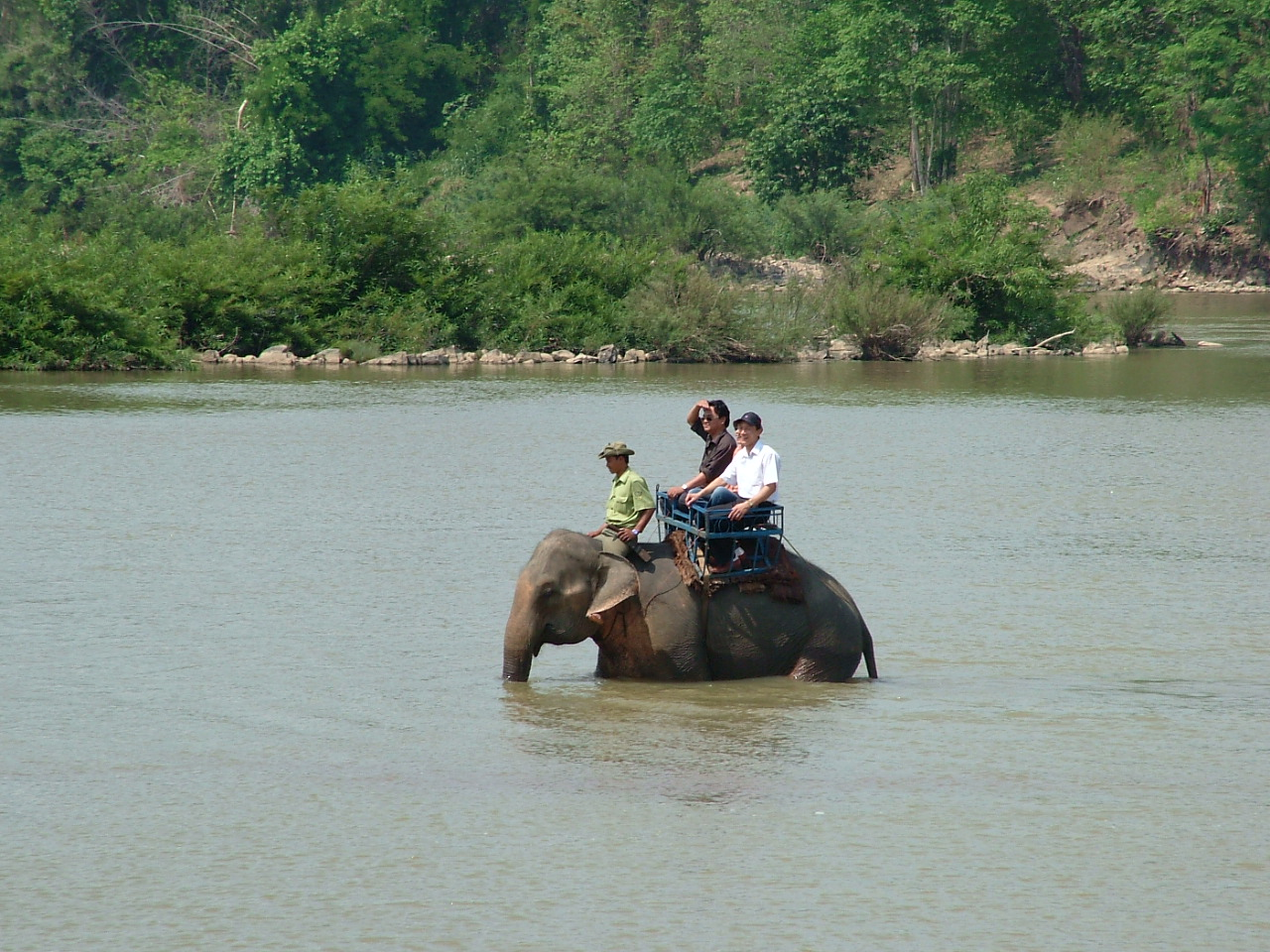

Yok Don National Park (Vietnamese: Vườn quốc gia Yok Đôn) is a national park located in Buôn Đôn commune, Đắk Lắk Province, South Central Coast and Central Highlands of Vietnam, 40 km west of Buôn Ma Thuột ward. The park was established in 1991 to protect 582 km² of a biological area of khộp lowland forest. The total area is 1,155.45 km² (not including a buffer zone of 1,138.9 km^{2}). It borders Mondulkiri Protected Forest (Cambodia) to the west and is part of maybe the largest protected area complex in southeast Asia

== Biodiversity ==
The vegetation at Yok Don National Park is dominated by a mosaic of deciduous forest and semi-evergreen (mixed deciduous) forest, with smaller areas of evergreen forest, particularly on hills and along watercourses. 474 vascular plant species have been recorded in the park.

Yok Don National Park has one of the most biodiverse forest in Vietnam. This park is an important site for the conservation of globally endangered species such as Indochinese tiger, Indochinese leopard, Indian elephant and gaur. However, the population of the four species at the park have suffered major declines.
