= Ea Wer =

Ea Wer Xã Ea Wer
- Rural commune and village
- Ea Wer
- Location within Vietnam
- Coordinates: 12°50′09″N 107°52′18″E
- Country: Vietnam
- Region: Central Highlands
- Province: Đắk Lắk

Area
  - Total: 184.61 km^{2} (71.28 sq mi)

Population (2025)
  - Total: 29,708
  - Density: 161/km^{2} (420/sq mi)
- Time zone: UTC+07:00 (Indochina Time)
- Postal code: 63806
- Area code: 24241
- Website: eawer.daklak.gov.vn

Ea Wer is a commune (xã) and village of Đắk Lắk Province, Vietnam.

On June 16, 2025, the Standing Committee of the National Assembly issued Resolution No. 1660/NQ-UBTVQH15 on the reorganization of commune-level administrative units in Đắk Lắk Province in 2025 (the resolution took effect on the date of its adoption). Accordingly, the entire natural area and population of Ea Huar Commune, Tân Hòa Commune, and Ea Wer Commune were consolidated to establish a new commune named Ea Wer Commune.

== Name ==
Its name Ea Wer means "the flaming river" from Rhade language.

== Geography ==
The commune covers an area of 184,61 square kilometres and as of 2025 had a population of 29.708 people.

Ea Wer commune is located along Tỉnh Lộ 1 (ĐT1), with a geographical location:

To the east, it borders Ea M'Droh commune .

To the southwest, it borders Đắk Wil commune , Lam Dong province.

To the south, it borders Ea Nuôl commune .

To the north and northwest, it borders Buôn Đôn, Đắk Lắk commune .
