= Krông Nô, Lâm Đồng =

Krông Nô Xã Krông Nô
- Commune
- Krông Nô commune
- Location within Vietnam
- Coordinates: 12°27′51″N 107°51′35″E
- Country: Vietnam
- Region: Central Highlands
- Province: Lâm Đồng

Area
  - Total: 7.01 sq mi (18.16 km^{2})

Population (2020)
  - Total: 7,525
  - Metro density: 1,070/sq mi (414/km^{2})
- Time zone: UTC+7 (UTC + 7)

Krông Nô is a commune (xã) of Lâm Đồng Province, Vietnam.
