= Cư M'gar district =

Cu M'gar district Huyện Cư M'gar
- District
- Interactive map of Cu M'gar district
- Country: Vietnam
- Region: Central Highlands
- Province: Đắk Lắk province
- Capital: Quảng Phú

Area
  - Total: 317 sq mi (822 km^{2})

Population (2018)
  - Total: 173,024
- Time zone: UTC+7 (Indochina Time)
- Website: http://cumgar.com http://www.cumgar.daklak.gov.vn/

Cư M'gar is a rural district (huyện) of Đắk Lắk province in the Central Highlands mountainous region of Vietnam.

== History ==
Its name Cư M'gar means "the mountain of the crab" in Rhade language.

== Geography ==
As of 2003, the district had a population of 157,295. The district covers an area of 822 km^{2}. The district capital lies at Quảng Phú town, where used to be a large pepper farm.

== See also ==
- Cư M'jut district
