= Ea Nuôl =

Ea Nuôl Xã Ea Nuôl
- Rural commune and village
- Location within Vietnam
- Coordinates: 12°43′06″N 107°56′11″E
- Country: Vietnam
- Region: Central Highlands
- Province: Đắk Lắk

Area
  - Total: 111.74 km^{2} (43.14 sq mi)

Population (2025)
  - Total: 43,706
  - Density: 394/km^{2} (1,020/sq mi)
- Time zone: UTC+07:00 (Indochina Time)

Ea Nuôl is a commune (xã) and village of Đắk Lắk Province, Vietnam. The commune covers an area of 67.73 square kilometres and in 1999 had a population of 8,591 people.

On June 16, 2025, the Standing Committee of the National Assembly issued Resolution No. 1660/NQ-UBTVQH15 on the reorganization of commune-level administrative units in Đắk Lắk Province in 2025 (the resolution took effect on the date of its adoption). Accordingly, the entire natural area and population of Ea Bar Commune (Buôn Đôn District), Cuôr Knia Commune, and Ea Nuôl Commune were consolidated to establish a new commune named Ea Nuôl Commune.

== Name ==
Its name Ea Nuôl is related with the legend of Krông Ana ("the river of the elder sister"), a story of the incest love. It means "the spring of the little brother".
