= Buôn Đôn =

- Commune
- Xã Buôn Đôn
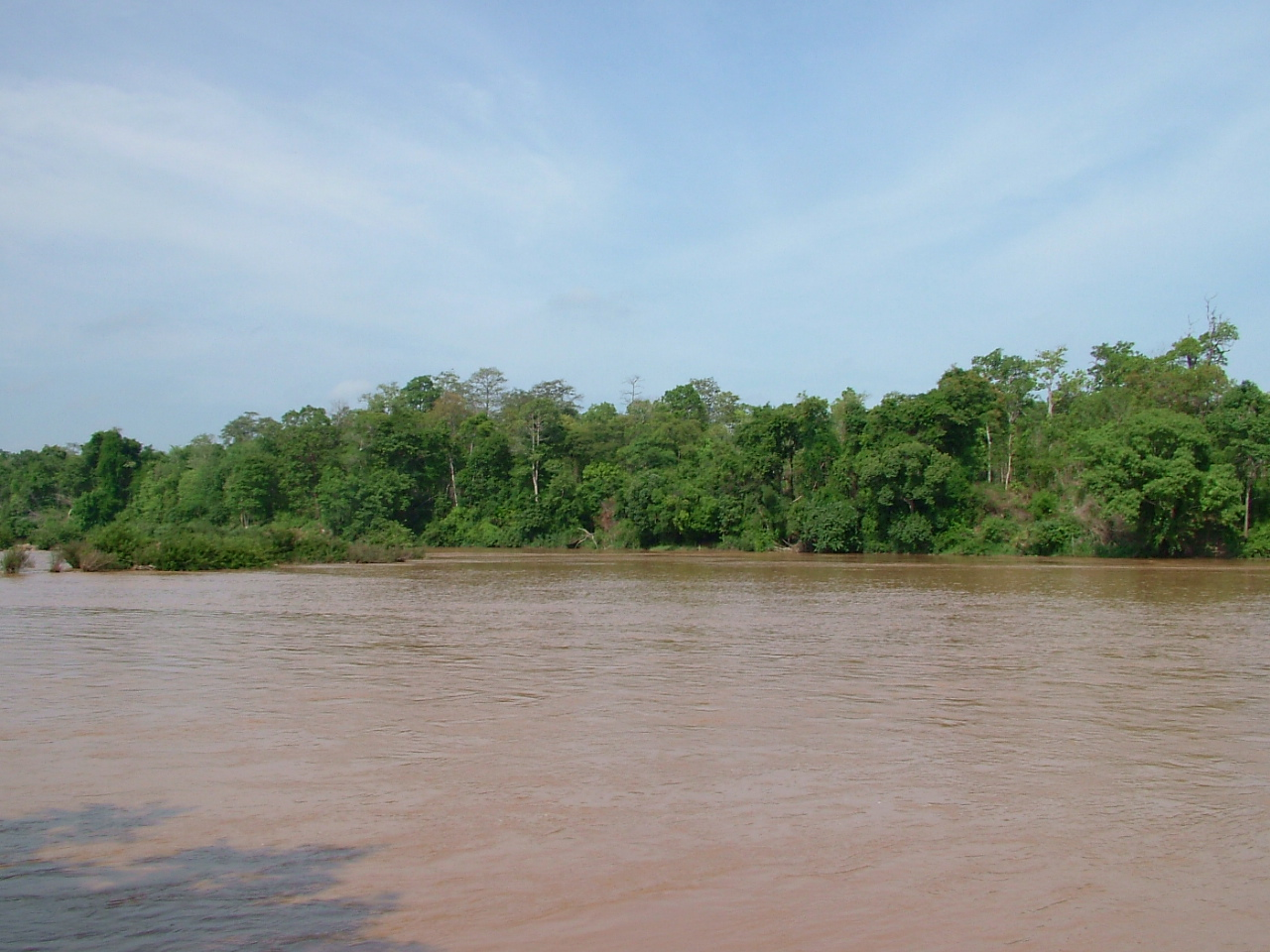
- Yok Đôn in Central Highlands dry season

- Location within Vietnam
- Coordinates: 12°48′30″N 107°40′40″E
- Country: Vietnam
- Region: Central Highlands
- Province: Đắk Lắk

Area
  - Total: 1,113.79 km^{2} (430.04 sq mi)

Population (2025)
  - Total: 6,582
  - Density: 5/km^{2} (13/sq mi)
- Time zone: UTC+07:00 (Indochina Time)
- Website: buondon.daklak.gov.vn

Buôn Đôn is a commune of Đắk Lắk Province, Vietnam, not far from the Cambodia border. The village lies in the centre of the Srepok River basin, within Yok Đôn National Park. The national park lies on the Ea Sup plain which dominates the landscape of the commune. The commune is home to festivals such as Buon Don Ethnic Traditional Cultural Festival and also hosts an elephant race.

It is one of the 102 new wards and communes of the province following the reorganization in 2025. On June 16, 2025, the Standing Committee of the National Assembly issued Resolution No. 1660/NQ-UBTVQH15 on the reorganization of commune-level administrative units in Đắk Lắk Province in 2025 (the resolution took effect on the date of its adoption). Accordingly, the former Krông Na Commune (Buôn Đôn District) was renamed Buôn Đôn Commune.
