= Krông Nô River =

River in Vietnam

The Krông Nô River (Vietnamese: Sông Krông Nô) is a river of Vietnam. It flows through Đắk Lắk Province for 156 kilometres and has a basin area of 3920 km².
