= Buôn Đôn district =

Buôn Đôn district Huyện Buôn Đôn
- District
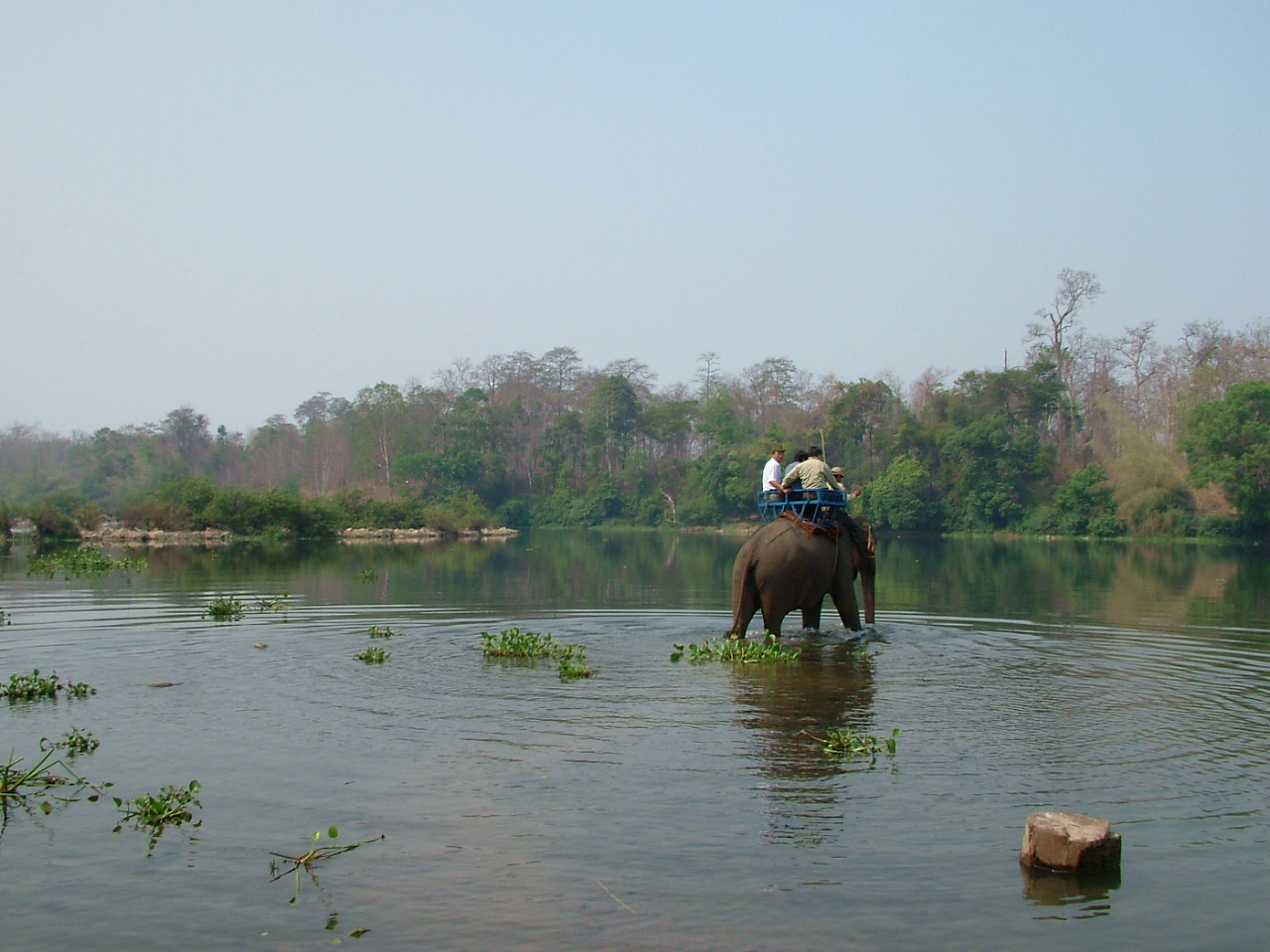

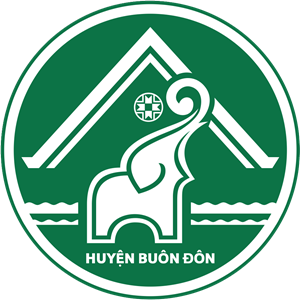
- Seal
- Interactive map of Buôn Đôn district
- Country: Vietnam
- Region: Central Highlands
- Province: Đắk Lắk
- Capital: Ea Wer

Population (2018)
  - Total: 63,816
- Time zone: UTC+7 (Indochina Time)

Buôn Đôn is a former rural district of Đắk Lắk province in the Central Highlands region of Vietnam. As of 2003, the district had a population of 56,238. The district covers an area of 1,414 km². The district capital lies at Ea Wer.

== Name ==
Its original name is Băn Dón (Buôn Dôn in Rhade language) from Laotian language, what means "the village of the isle". It is related with a small stone bund on Srepok River, where Laotian people have lived since the 19th century.

== Administrative divisions ==
It contains one township, Buôn Đôn, and seven communes:

- Cuôr Knia
- Ea Bar
- Ea Huar
- Ea Nuôl
- Ea Wer
- Krông Na
- Tân Hòa
