= Ea Súp =

Ea Súp Xã Ea Súp
- Commune
- Location within Vietnam
- Coordinates: 13°4′15″N 107°53′2″E
- Country: Vietnam
- Region: Central Highlands
- Province: Đắk Lắk

Area
  - Total: 161.67 sq mi (418.72 km^{2})

Population (2025)
  - Total: 30,762
  - Density: 190/sq mi (73/km^{2})
- Time zone: UTC+7 (UTC + 7)
- Area code: 24211
- Website: easup.daklak.gov.vn

Ea Súp is a commune (xã) of Đắk Lắk Province in the Central Highlands region of Vietnam.
