= Commune (Vietnam) =

Type of second-level administrative unit in Vietnam

A commune (Vietnamese: xã) is a type of second tier subdivision of Vietnam. It is divided into 2,621 units. Communes have a lower status than provinces and centrally-governed city.

This subdivision has existed since 1428, when Emperor Lê Thái Tổ re-organised the country into five administrative levels. Xã (or 社) was the lowest level, equivalent to a village.

Since 2019, Vietnam has undertaken a comprehensive rearrangement of administrative units in order to streamline the apparatus of local authorities. The re-organisation, conducted in two periods, between 2020 and 2023 and between 2023 and 2030, comprises forced mergers of several districts and commune-level administrative units and localities. As of April 2023, the number of third-level subdivision units dropped to 10,598 units including 1,737 wards, 614 commune-level towns and 8,247 communes. This has been a significant reduction from 11,162 in 2018.

== Facts ==
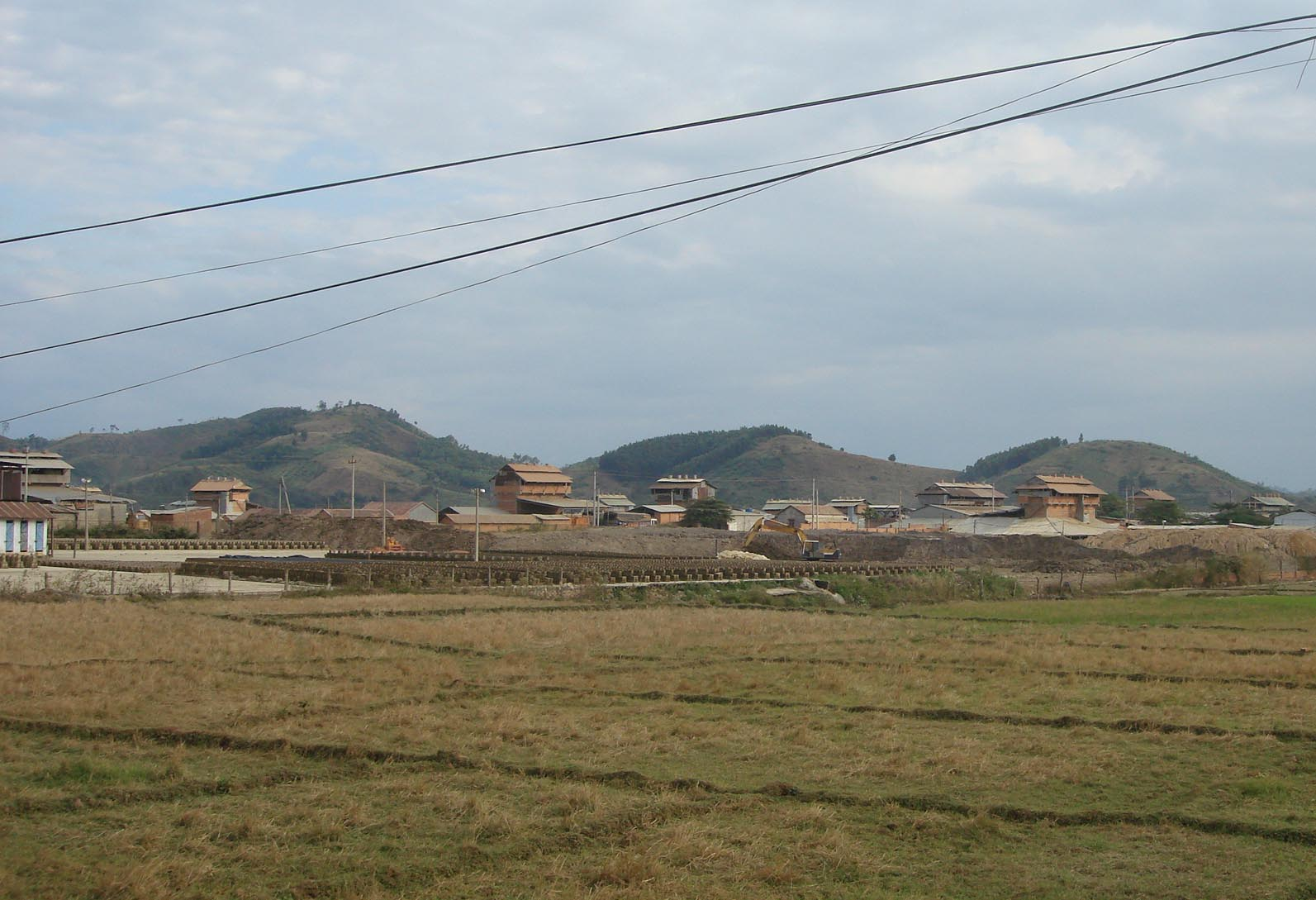
Ea Bông commune in Đắk Lắk Province.

Certain small villages are not officially regarded as administrative communes.

As of December 31, 2008, Vietnam had 9,111 communes. Thanh Hoá Province contained the highest number of communes (586) amongst all province-level administrative units, followed by Nghệ An Province with 436 and Hanoi with 408. Đà Nẵng, with only 11 communes, contained the fewest. Counted together, the ten province-level administrative units containing the most communes—namely, Thanh Hoá (586), Nghệ An (436), Hanoi (408), Thái Bình (267), Phú Thọ (251), Hà Tĩnh (238), Hải Dương (234), Quảng Nam (210), Bắc Giang (207) and Lạng Sơn (207)—contain one-third of all the communes in Vietnam. Three of these are located in the Red River Delta region, three in the Đông Bắc (Northeast) region, three in the Bắc Trung Bộ (North Central Coast) region and one in the Nam Trung Bộ (South Central Coast) region.

According to data extracted from General Statistics Office of Vietnam, there were 11,164 third-level (commune-level) administrative subdivisions. As of 2018 February, the number of third-level administrative subdivisions in Vietnam was 11,162.

As of April 2023, the number of third-level units dropped to 10,598 units including 1,737 wards, 614 commune-level towns and 8,247 communes

== History ==
=== Dynastic period ===
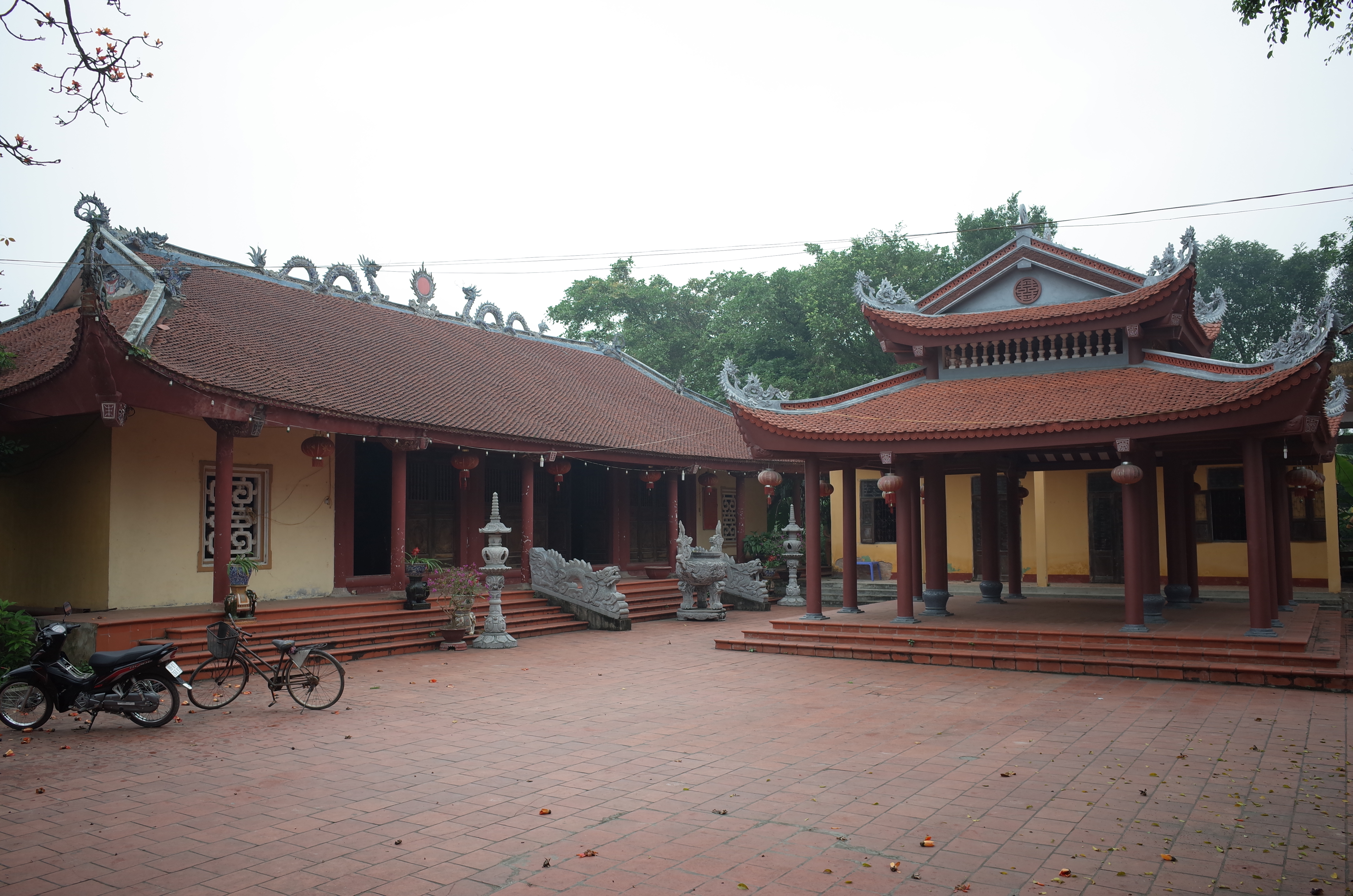
A village temple in Bắc Ninh province

After ascending to the throne of Vietnam and established the Lê Dynasty, Lê Thái Tổ divided the country into đạo 道 (province), phủ 府, huyện 縣 (district or county), and xã 社 (commune). The leader of the basic administrative unit xã was titled xã quan 社官, later renamed xã trưởng 社長. Xã were classified as đại xã 大社, trung xã 中社 and tiểu xã 小社 based on their population.

The Nguyễn Dynasty (1802-1945) maintained xã as the smalles administrative unit. The name of the manager was renamed to lí trưởng 里長 by Emperor Minh Mạng in his 1831 administrative reforms. The lí trưởng was elected by villagers democratically among members of a legislative council called Hội đồng kỳ dịch or Hội đồng kỳ mục, which was made up of most educated people in the village.

After successfully colonising Cochinchina and the whole Vietnam, the French introduced reforms to the village councils, the latest of which saw the council shortened to a group of 7 members, however, the leader was selected among this group, not by villagers.

=== South Vietnam ===
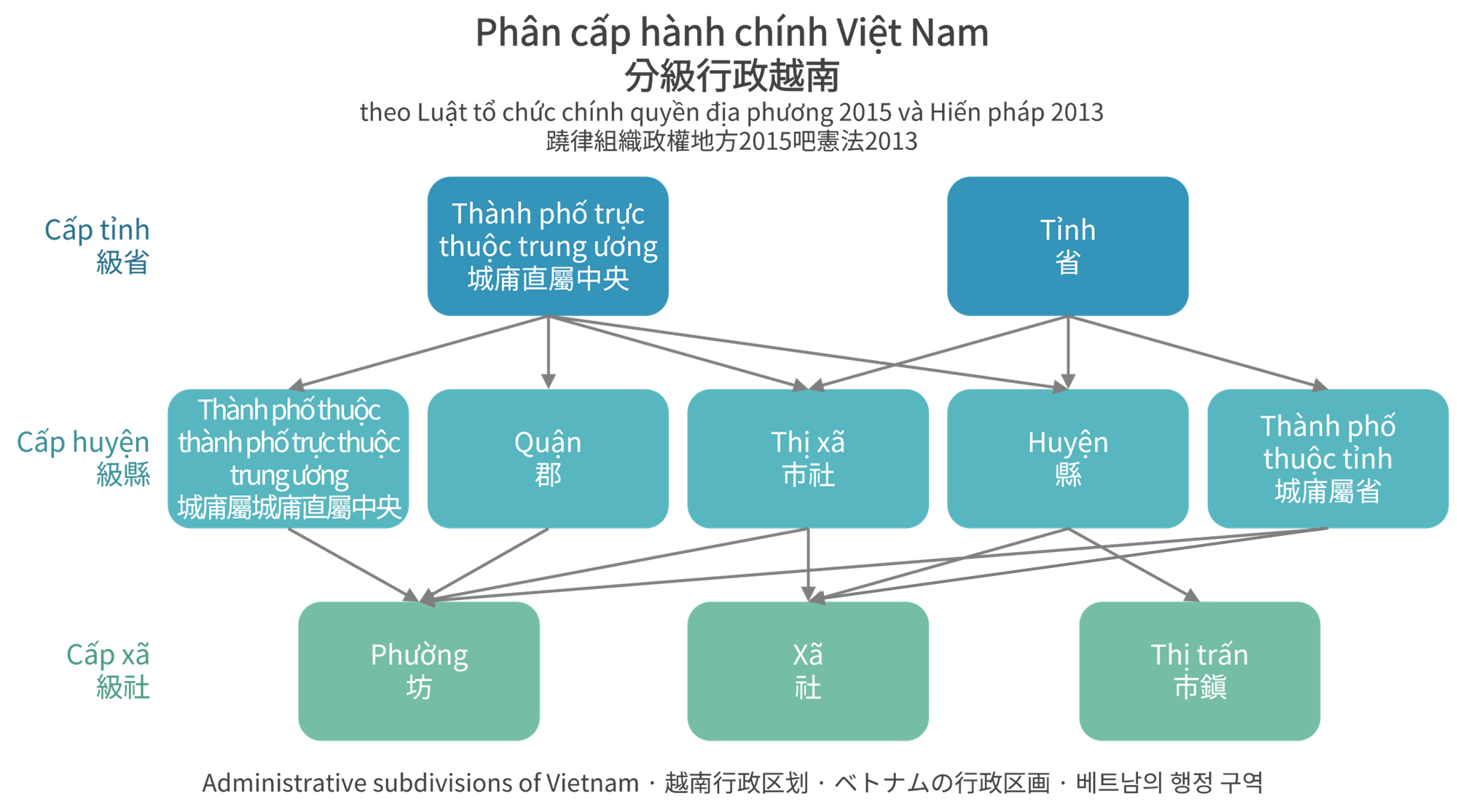
Xã (communes) lie at the 3rd levels of administrative divisions in Vietnam

Under the jurisdiction of State of Vietnam and South Vietnam, xã was the lowest administrative unit under quận (district). Xã existed in almost all urban and rural places in South Vietnam with the exception of Saigon. For example, the city centre of Vĩnh Long town lied in the area of xã Long Châu, Châu Thành district, Vĩnh Long province, despite it was a vibrant town centre.

Communes that reached a higher urbanisation status could be elevated to the status of thị xã (literally 'urban commune') such as Rạch Giá, Biên Hòa, Nha Trang. In such case, the xã was recognised as an autonomous unit in the same level as a province or a centrally-governed city.

Politically, a xã was governed by a xã trưởng, usually a government official assigned by the District head. The xã trưởng was assisted by a hội đồng xã (commune council), made up of a sheriff, treasurer, administrative official and home affairs official.

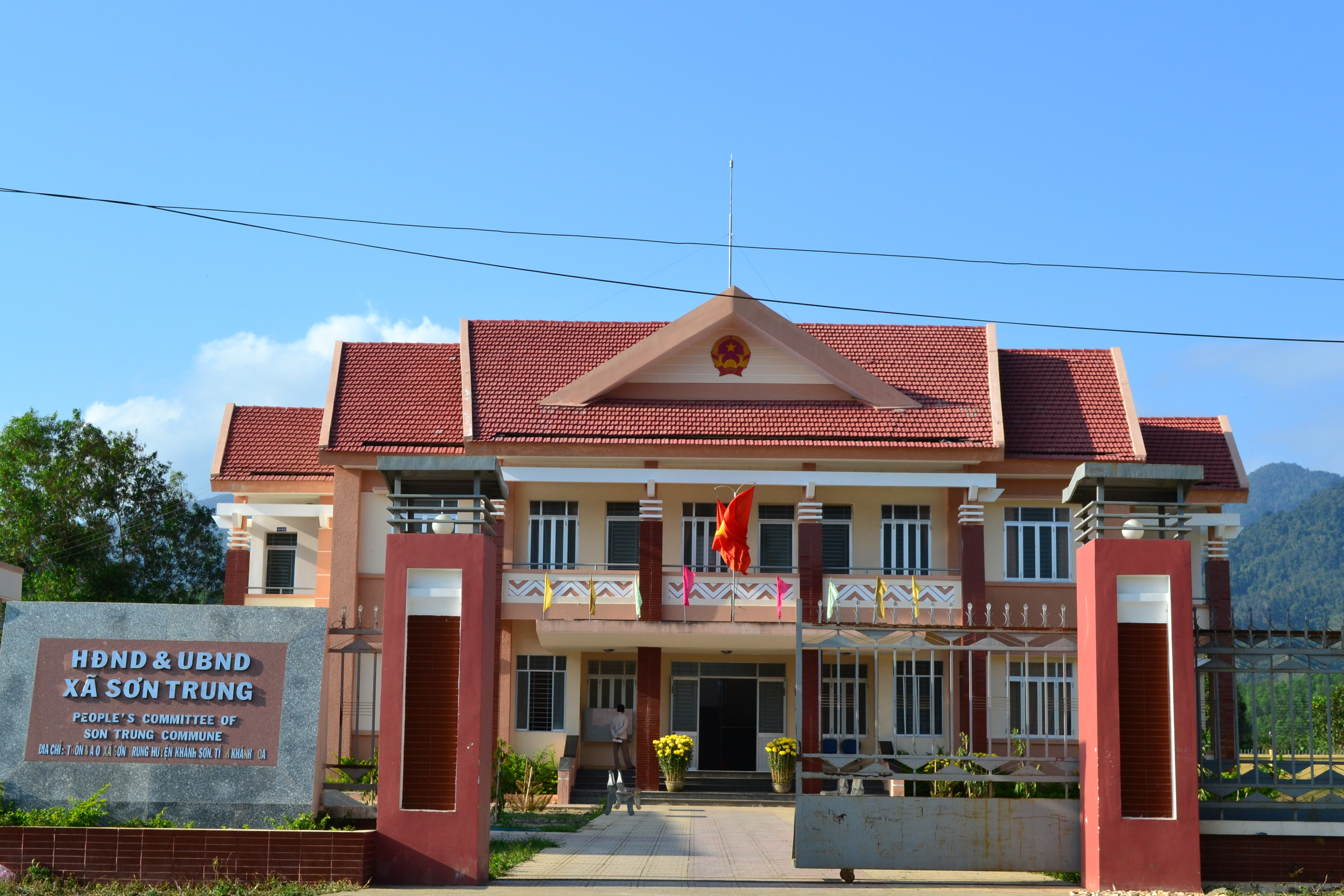
Government office of Sơn Trung Commune, Hương Sơn district, Hà Tĩnh province

In 1957, South Vietnamese President Ngo Dinh Diem launched a counter-insurgency project known as Strategic Hamlet Program, in order to isolate the rural Vietnamese from contact with and influence by the communist National Liberation Front (NLF). A number of "fortified villages", called "joint families" (Vietnamese: liên gia), were created throughout South Vietnam, consisting of villages that had been consolidated and reshaped to create a defensible perimeter. The peasants themselves would be given weapons and trained in self-defense. Several problems—including corruption, unnecessary amounts of forced relocation and poor execution—caused the program to backfire drastically, decrease support for Diem's regime and increase sympathy for Communist efforts.

=== Socialist Republic of Vietnam ===
After reunifying the country, xã remains the lowest administratrive unit in Vietnam. It continues to be the name of the lowest administrative unit in a rural district as well as the rural outskirts of larger provincial towns and cities.
