= Ea Na =

- Commune
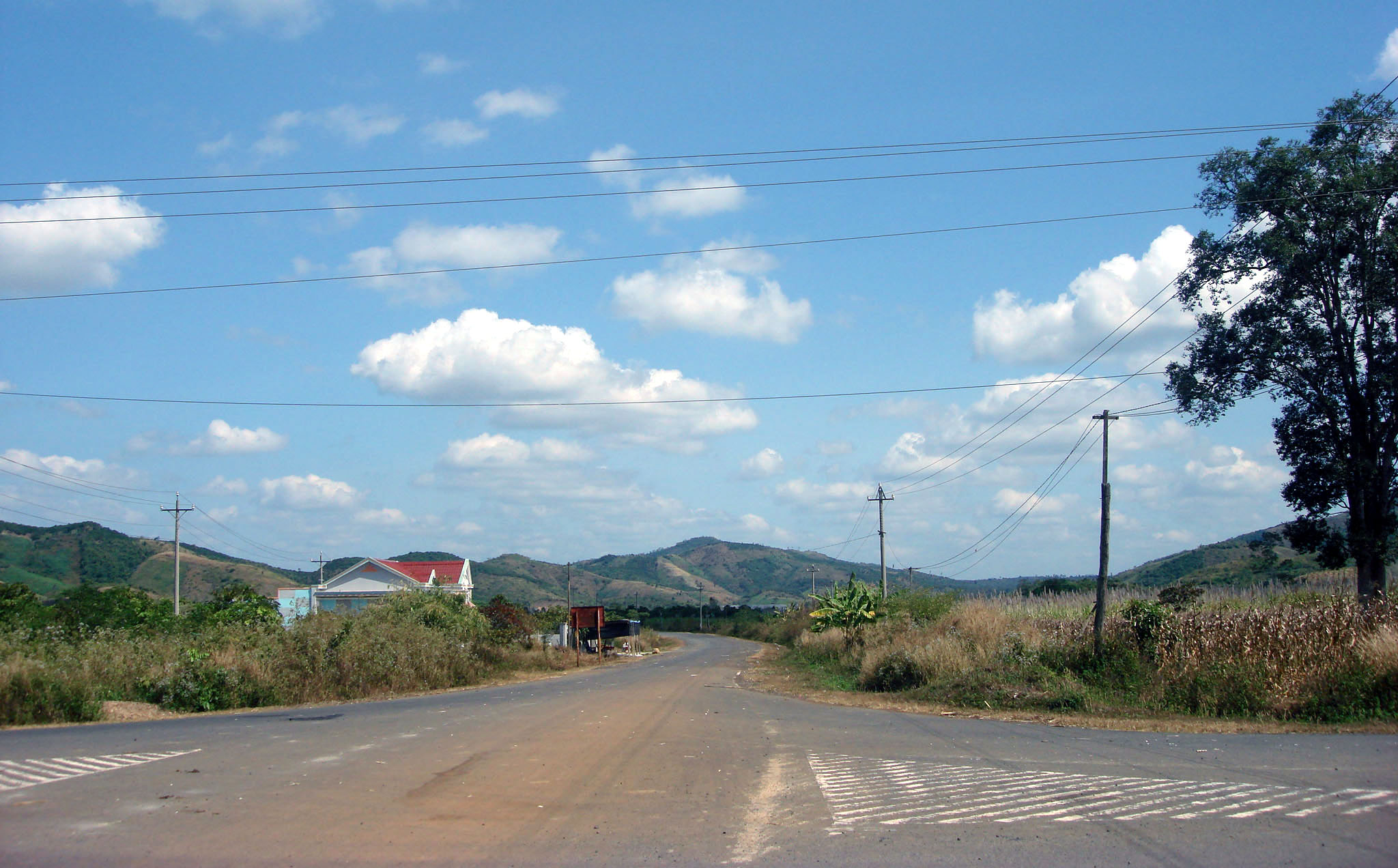
- A highland village in the commune of Dray Sáp.

- Location within Vietnam
- Coordinates: 12°7′16″N 108°32′38″E
- Country: Vietnam
- Region: Central Highlands
- Province: Đắk Lắk
- Time zone: UTC+07:00 (Indochina Time)

Ea Na is a commune (xã) in Đắk Lắk Province, Vietnam.

On June 16, 2025, the Standing Committee of the National Assembly issued Resolution No. 1660/NQ-UBTVQH15 on the reorganization of commune-level administrative units in Đắk Lắk Province in 2025 (the resolution took effect on the date of its adoption). Accordingly, the entire natural area and population of Ea Bông Commune, Dray Sáp Commune, and Ea Na Commune were consolidated to establish a new commune named Ea Na Commune.

== Economy ==
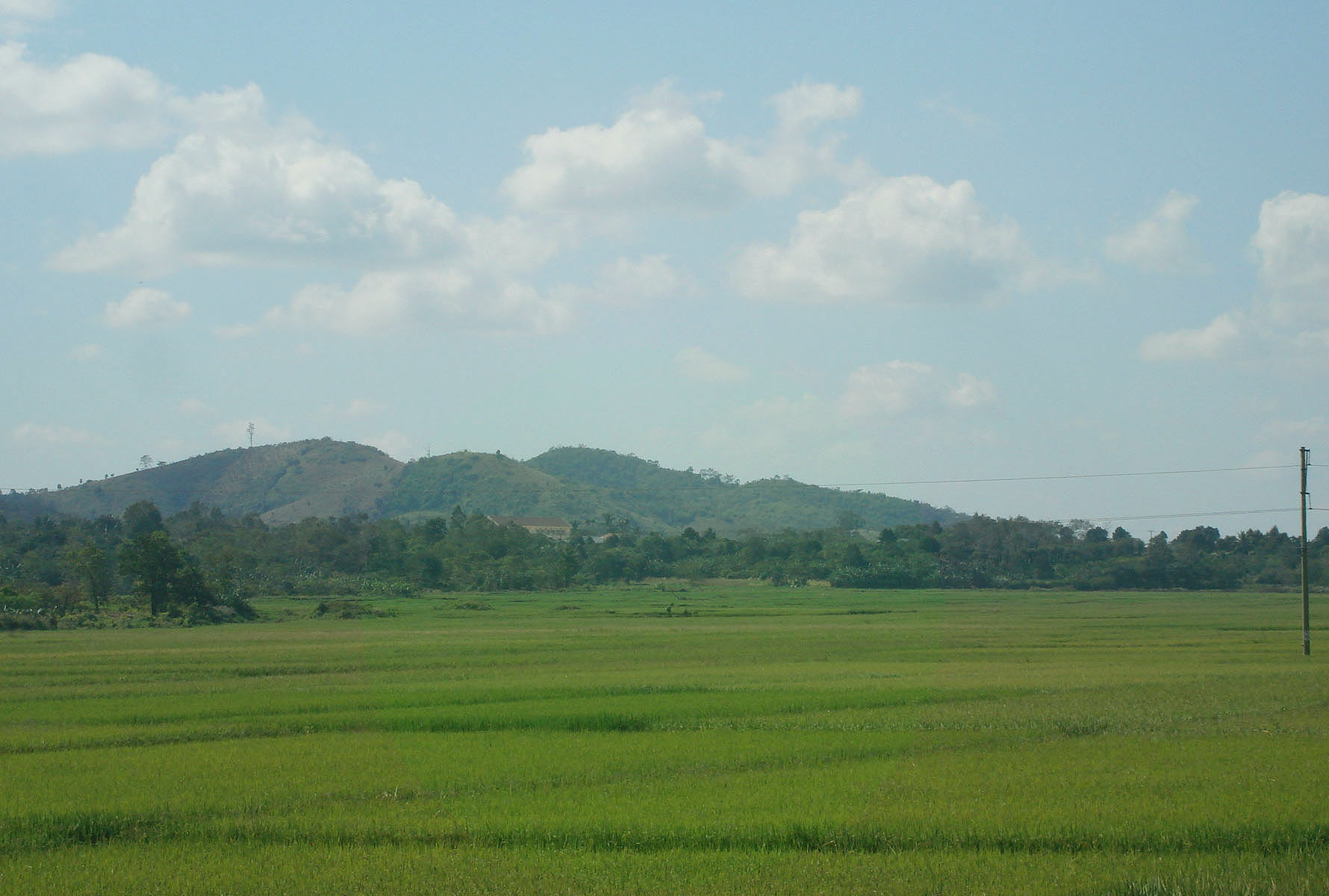
Rice fields

An agricultural commune, it produces rice, coffee and pepper. The Buon Kuop hydropower plant in the commune has a capacity of 280MW. There are two waterfalls that flow through the commune, including the Gia Long and Dray Sap waterfalls which attract tourists.
