= Krông Ana River =

River in Vietnam

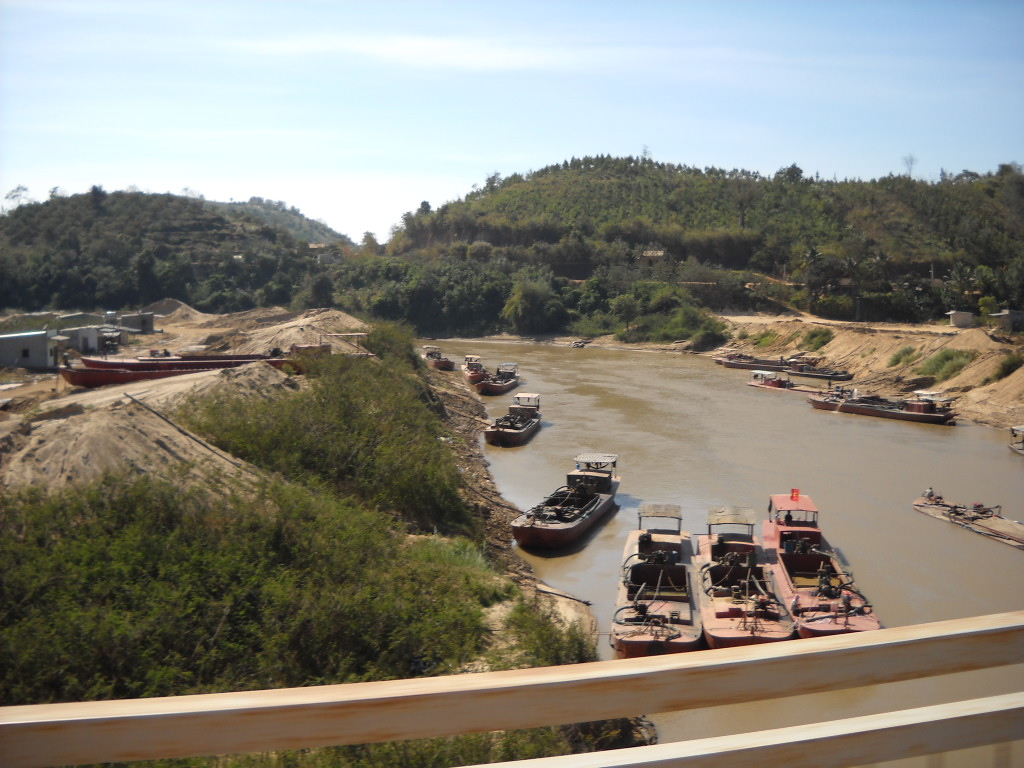
Krông Ana River

The Krông Ana River (Vietnamese: Sông Krông Ana) is a river of Vietnam. It flows through Đắk Lắk Province for 215 kilometres and has a basin area of 3960 km². It is the principal tributary of the Srepok River. The Gia Long and Dray Nur Falls lie along this river.
