= Doko =

Doko may refer to:

== Places ==
- Doko, Benin, arrondissement in Kouffo, Benin
- Doko, Democratic Republic of the Congo, town served by Doko Airport
- Doko, Guinea, town in Guinea
- Doko, Pakistan, a village in Gilgit-Baltistan, Pakistan

== Languages ==
- Doko language (Bantu), a language spoken in Democratic Republic of Congo
- Basketo language, a language spoken in Ethiopia one of whose two dialects is Doko
- Uyanga language, a language spoken in Nigeria, also known as Doko or Iko
- Doko language (Nigeria), a language spoken in Nigeria

== Other uses ==
- Doko (basket), carrying basket used in Nepal and nearby countries
- "Doko" (song), song by Kaela Kimura on Hocus Pocus album
- Dōkō, Japanese gay men's magazine
- Don Doko Don, Japanese video game
- Doppelkopf, German card game

== People with the name ==
=== Surname ===
- Izaak Huru Doko (1913–1985), Indonesian politician
- Mayo Doko (土光 真代; born 1996), Japanese women's footballer
- Tania Doko, vocalist in Australian 1990s duo Bachelor Girl
- Toshiwo Doko, (1896–1988), Japanese engineer
- Ibrahim Hussaini Doko, DG Raw Materials Research and Development Councils

=== Given name ===
- Đoko Šalić (born 1995), Serbian basketball player
- Tetsugen Doko (1630–1682), Japanese zen master

== See also ==
- Dokos, island of Greece
- Dokos shipwreck
