= Austroasiatic carrying basket =

Traditional wicker backpacks of Southeast Asia

The austroasiatic carrying basket or kapha is a wicker basket common to many Austroasiatic and Austronesian peoples in Cambodia, Indonesia, Laos, Malaysia, Myanmar, Philippines, Thailand and Vietnam. It is carried on their back to go to the fields, but also at parties, where it serves as an adornment for the girls. Weaving these carrying baskets is a craft that has been passed down from generation to generation with a unity in style which has defined tribal identity and raised interest of ethnologists.

== History ==
Since the arrival of European ethnologists in the second hald of the 19th century, the austroasiatic carrying basket referred to by the French scientists as "hotte" attracted attention.

Backpack baskets did not appear with archeological evidence in Europe until the end of the 13th century. While the origin date of the austroasiatic carrying basket remains uncertain, André-Georges Haudricourt links the double straps of the Austroasiatic carrying basket with the arrival of kaftan from Mongolia, presuming that the gesture of putting on a coat and a basket are closely linked.

It has been presumed that this carrying basket common to Austrasiatic people spanning from Indonesia to Laos can also be explained by geography, as mountainous areas such as the ones in Southeast Asia, make it more difficult to keep one's gravity center, thus explaining the double-saddle balanced shape of the basket. It can also be compared to those found in Sikkim, in the Himalayas, which use one more band tied to the forehead for better levy.

== Typology ==
=== Description ===
The austroastic carrying baskets is usually woven with bamboo and rattan materials; the base is made of hewn wood (for the baskets of the Ede) or bamboo (for the baskets of the M'nong). The basket is woven in the shape of a round cylinder, with two straps made of very tough braided forest rope, one end is knitted with the body close to the mouth of the basket, the other end is tied with the base of the basket.

The hewn wooden base in the basket of the Ede people is also unique because it is a 4-sided wooden box, hewn completely by hand with a traditional axe from soft woods such as rice, and forest toads. It is also special because it is plaited from the bark of the cow's hoof, the rope made from the bark of the tree gives can improve durability, so it has also been used to make leashes or armchairs for riding elephants.

The austroastic carrying baskets are most often carried on the back, using support from "tumplines", or "burden straps" that wrap around shoulders in a way similar to papoose cradleboards. Some berry pickers tie austroasiatic carrying basket to their hip instead. These knotted straps for carrying on the back are the most distinctive feature of these baskets which also indicate their proper use.

=== Variety ===
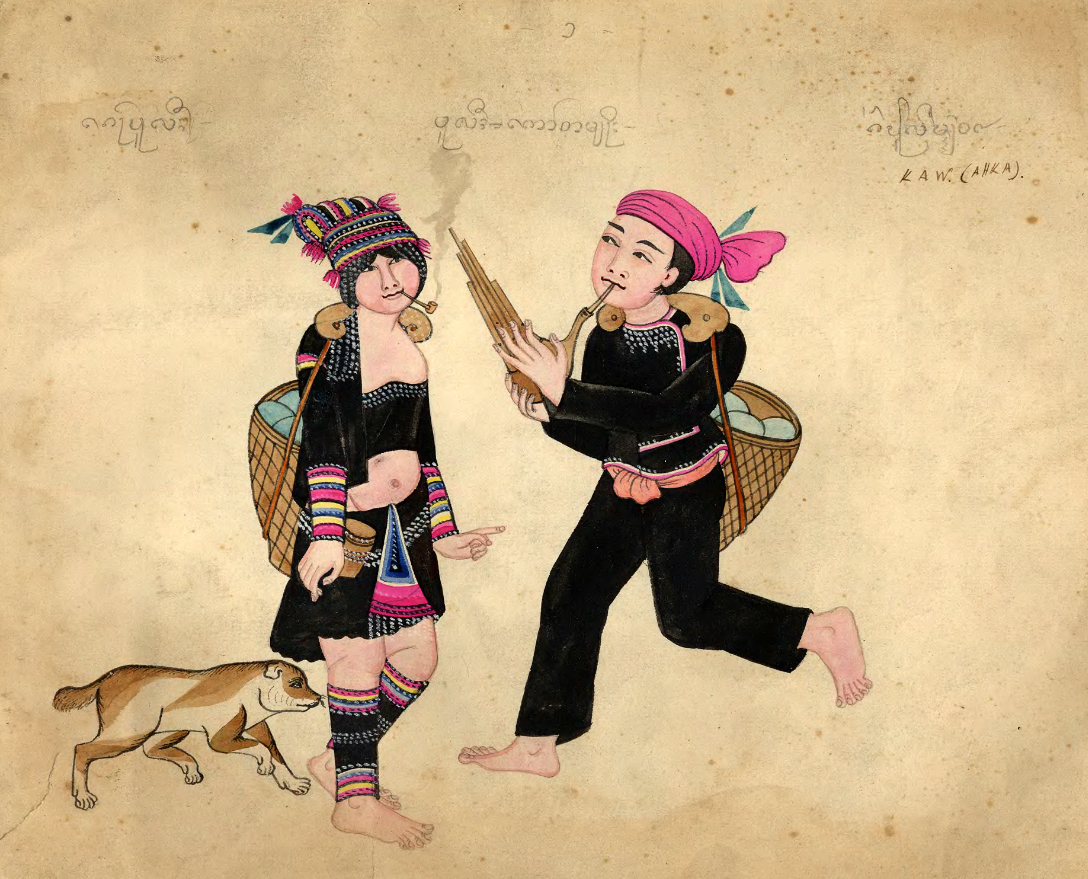
The Tibeto-Birman carrying basket uses a noticeably different single strap, putting the weight either on the neck or on the forehead.

As irrigated rice paddies, maze and ray fields leave gund to terraced paddie fields, the Austroasiatc carrying bag also becomes more prevalent from Laos to Indonesia. Despite its geographical unity, the carrying basket is also easily identified through specific characteristics from one area to the other.

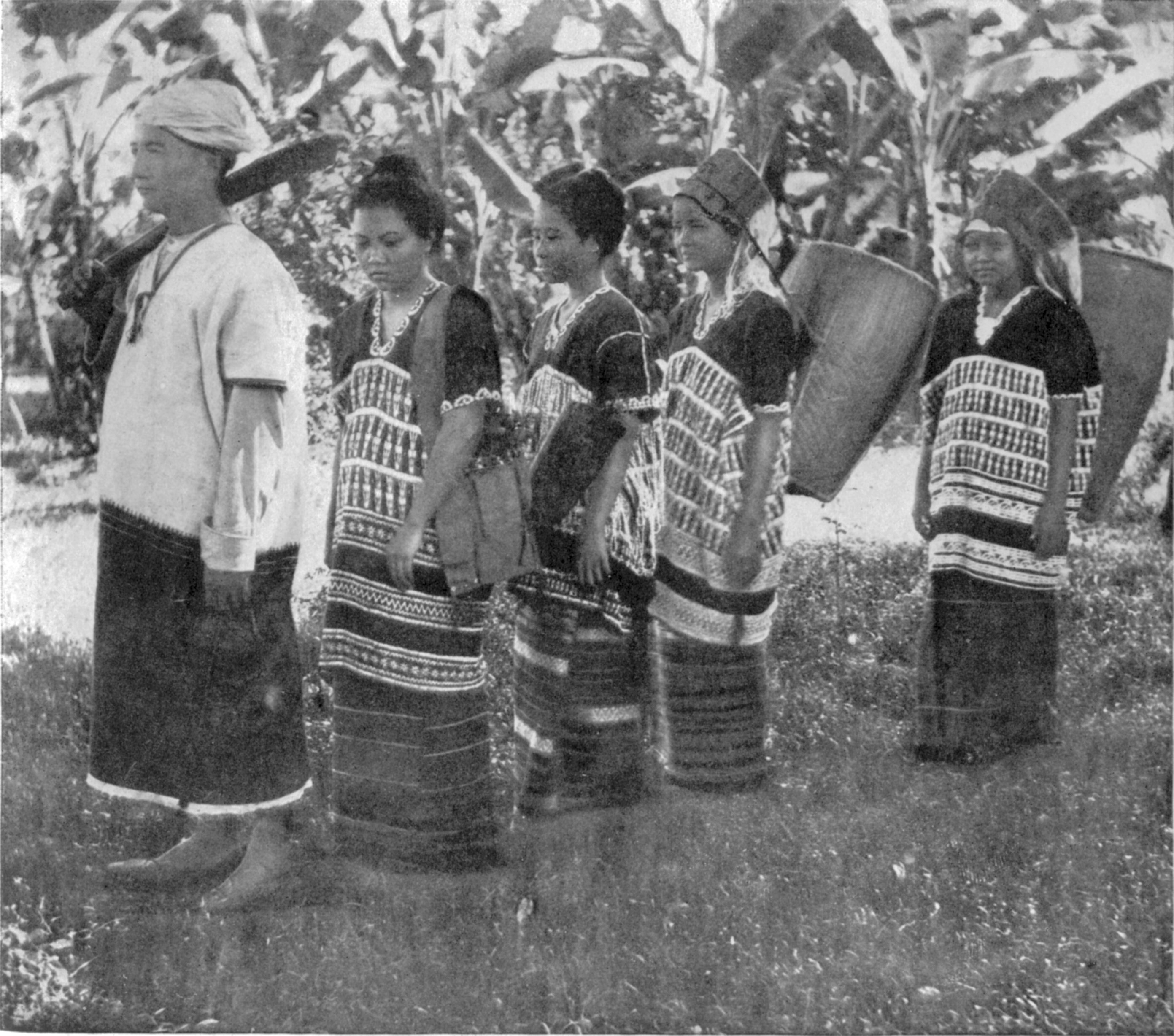
Different carrying baskets of the Karen people of Burma with all the weight on their foreheads in the Tibetan way.

The square base is the most characteristic element of the austroasiatic carrying basket. It varies from one region and one tribe to another, depending on the available materials and the local customs. Thus, the base is made of hewn wood for the baskets of the Rade people or it is made of bamboo for the baskets of the M'nong.

The Moi and the Khas people seem to be acquainted with the one-strap front-carried baskets so typical of the doko Nepali baskets found in the Himalayas. Different from most other Austroasiatic ethnic groups, these one-strip carrying bags have also been noted in Yunnan. Austroasiatic carrying bags usually have double straps to be carried on the back with more stability.

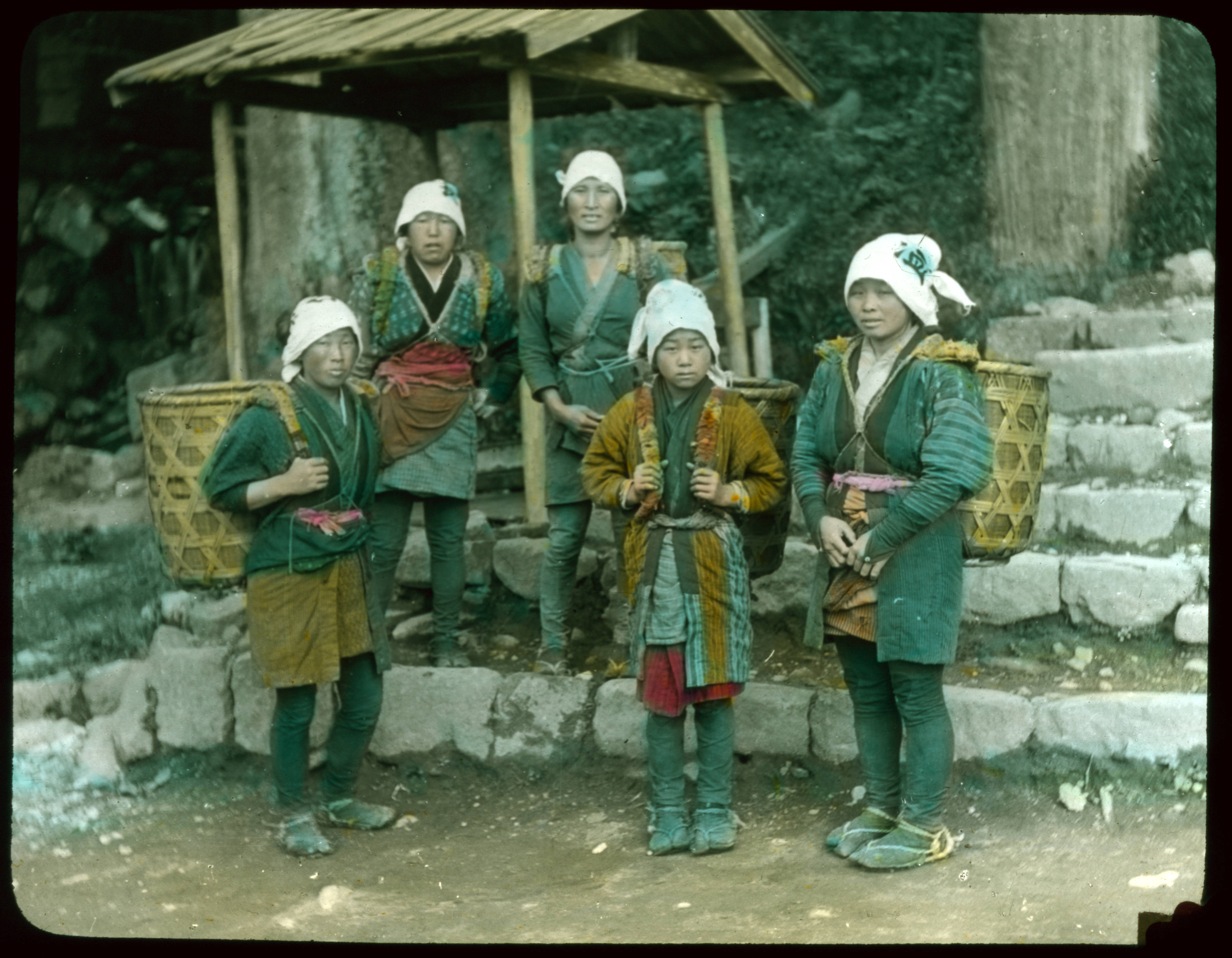
Distinct Japanese carrying similar strapped bags with no base but rattan criss-cross frame.

The Katu people are known for their wide variety of carrying bags while the Churu people are notorious for having the most heavily decorated Austroasiatic carrying bags.

== Craftmanship ==
An austroasiatic carrying basket is usually made of bamboo, a bamboo that only men are authorized to fetch in the forest, in June and July during the monsoon season in Southeast Asia. Only during these months have the bamboos reached an ideal level of development. They are neither too young nor too old. Straight bamboos, which knots are widely spaced and the top forms a sharp curve, are the best for making hoods. Once cut, these bamboos are dried in the sun for a week before being split into strips. Special knives which are small and extremely sharp with a pointed end are used to split these bamboos. The decisive factor is the skill and meticulousness of the basket weaver. Making a hood takes a lot of time, in order to decorate it with traditional patterns.

Kapha is not only an instrument in daily life, but also an art form that expresses the artistic talents, expresses the emotions of the weavers who create it.

— Kapha in Jarai culture

== Use ==
=== Rice measure ===
The tribal populations calculate the quantity not in weight but in volume of basket and the yield in number of baskets harvested for a basket sown. According to the Tampuan people, when one basket is sowed, it can reap as many as thirty five of the same-sized paddy baskets.

During harvest, the carrying basket was personalized as the skin and body of the rice to which promises and threats were made in popular rites: thus, a knife was stabbed in the ground or in a tree behind the carrying basket as an apotropaic sign of threat and protection.

In modern days, the austroasiatic carrying basket rice measurement has often been replaced by a kerosene tin.

=== Tribal identity ===
Along with the big jars known as sra peang and the gongs, the family's baskets are often part of the treasure and wealth of Austroasiatic indigenous families. In Ratanakiri, the carrying bags of kapha are seen carried by ominous statues on roundabouts as a sign of welcome and topographical identity amid fears of losing it.

=== Dance and esthetics ===
The austroasiatic carrying baskets are often included in tribal dances.

In fact, the carrying baskets are not only used for practical reasons, they are also part of a certain tribal esthetic. Thus, the Jeh-Tariang tribe has three differing carrying baskets, the largest being used to carry wood. According to their custom, a young bride must cut logs into five pieces which – and this is essential – must remain linked to each other, like the five petals of a flower. These logs of love will be part of her dowry delivered in the very same carrying basket, one of the gifts she will give to her future in-laws to keep them warm in winter.

== Gallery ==
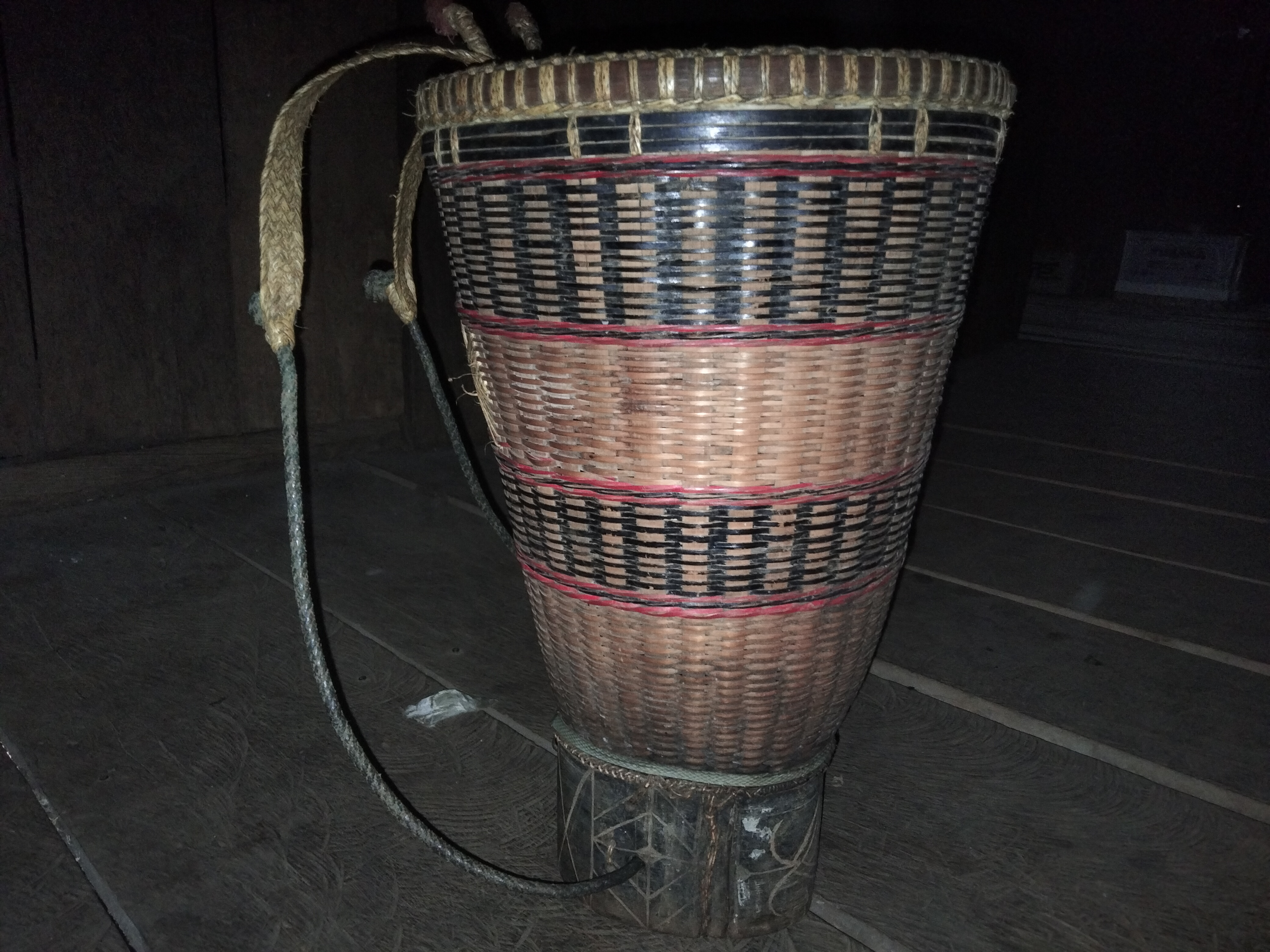
Tampuan version with its specific black and red rattan

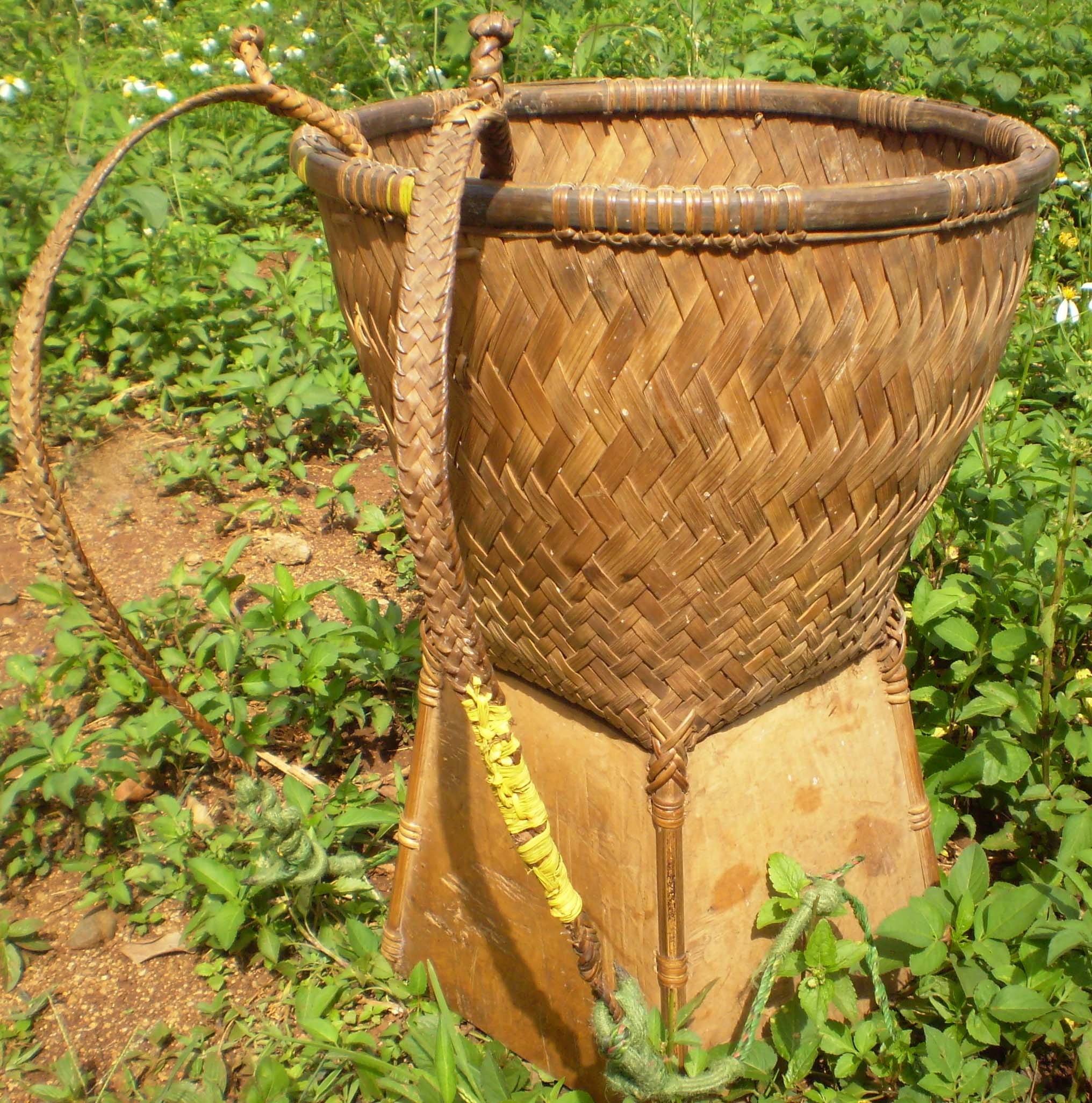
Rade version with its distinct oversized bambo base

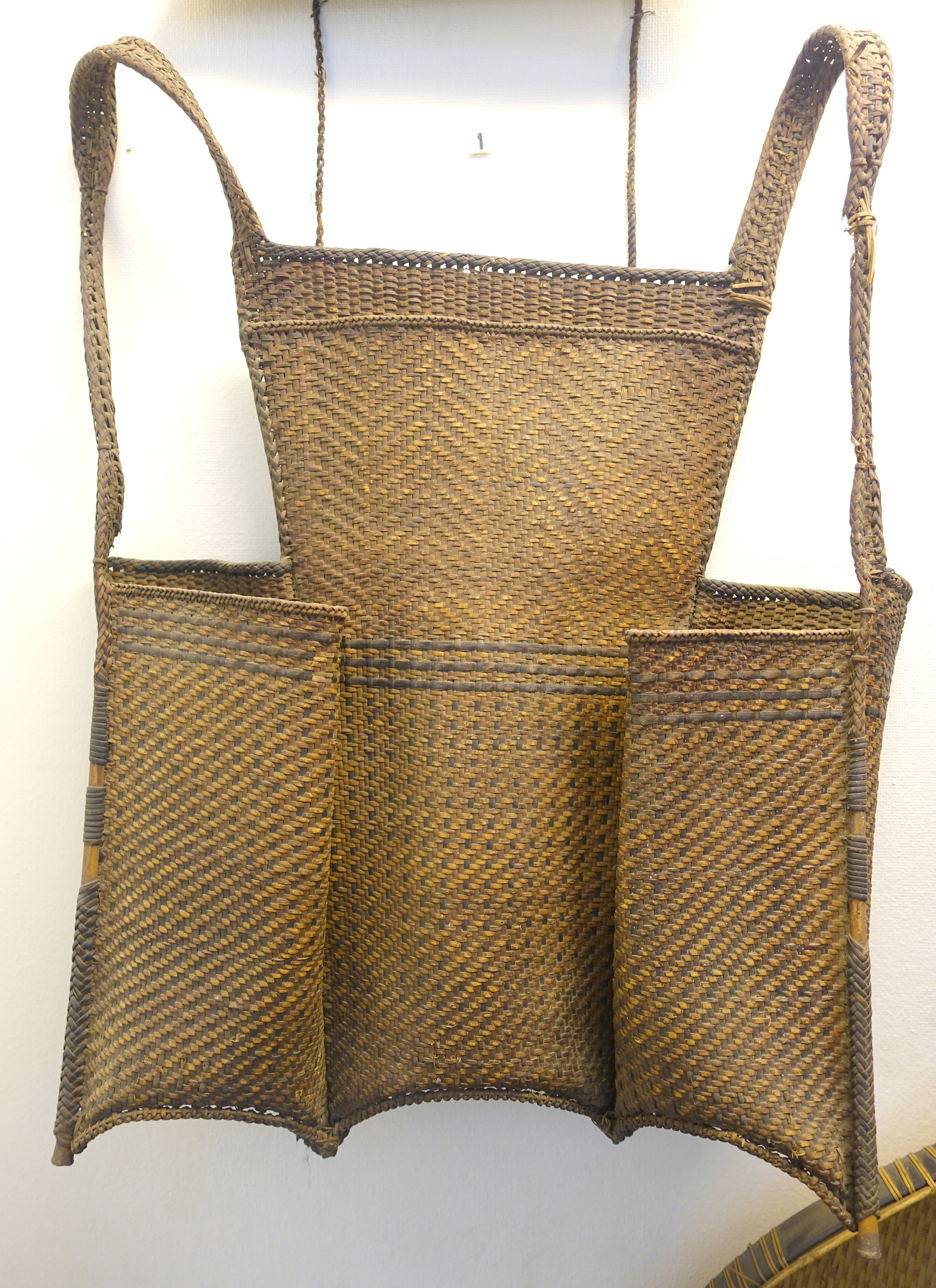
A more complex carrying bag of the De people in Vietnam

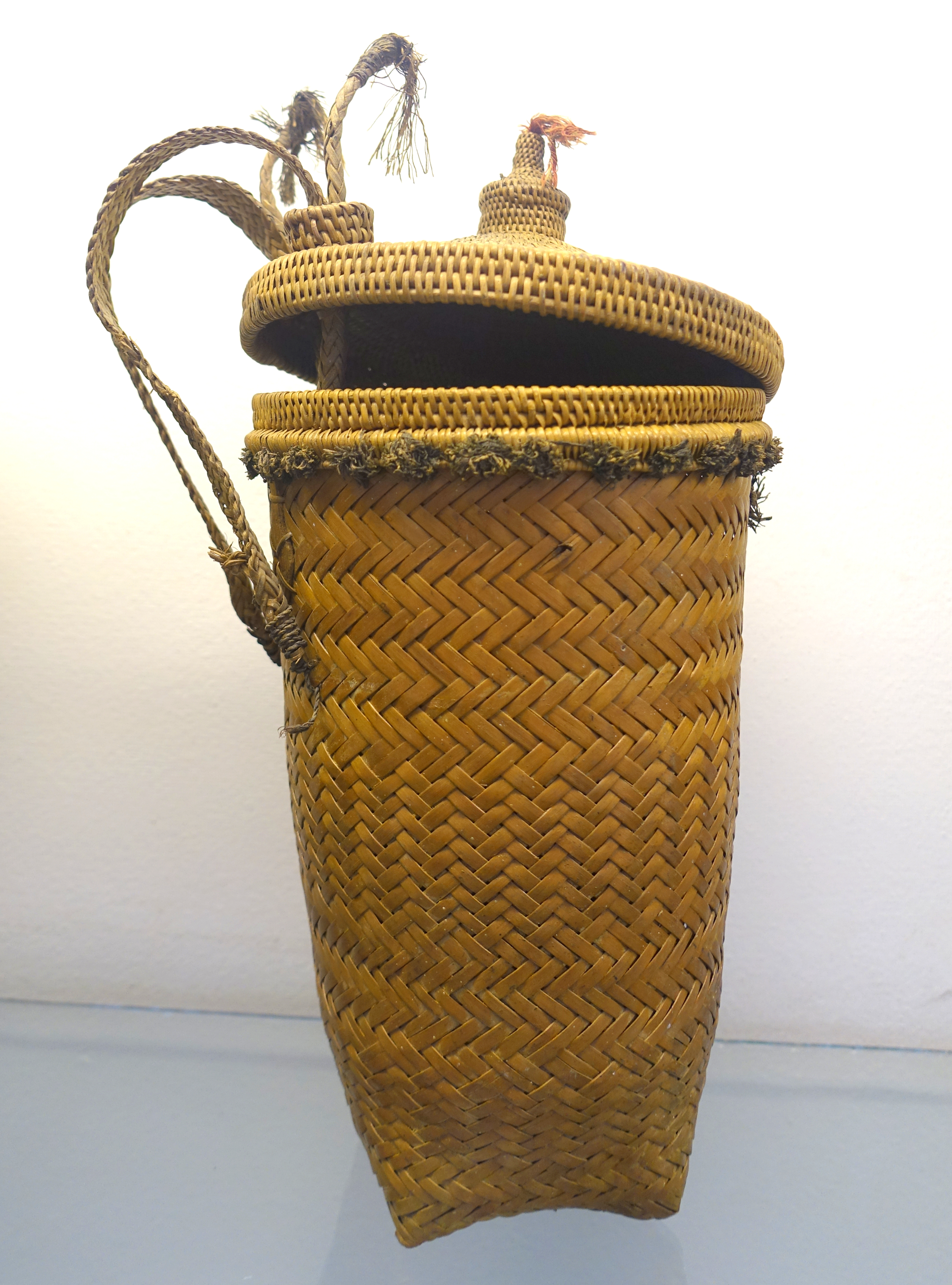
Carrying bag with a rattan cover from Vietnam

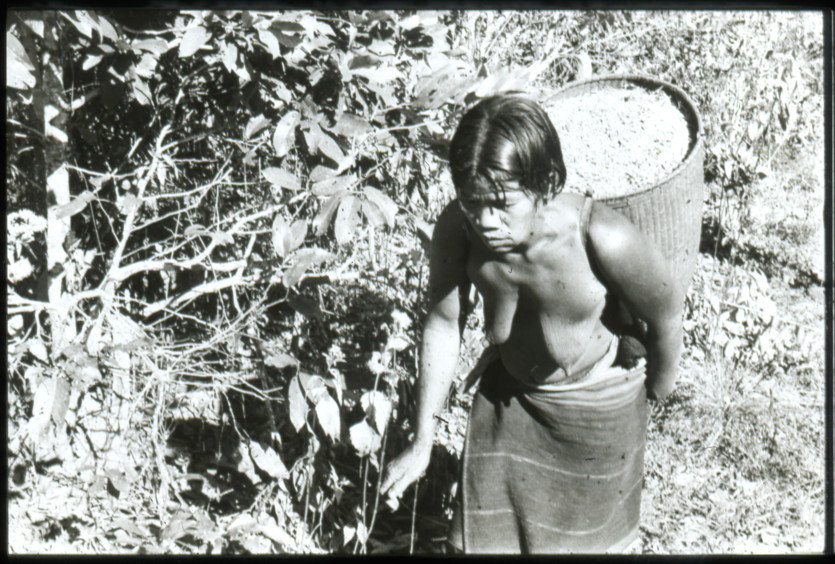
1962 picture of a carrying bast in Pleiku, Vietnam

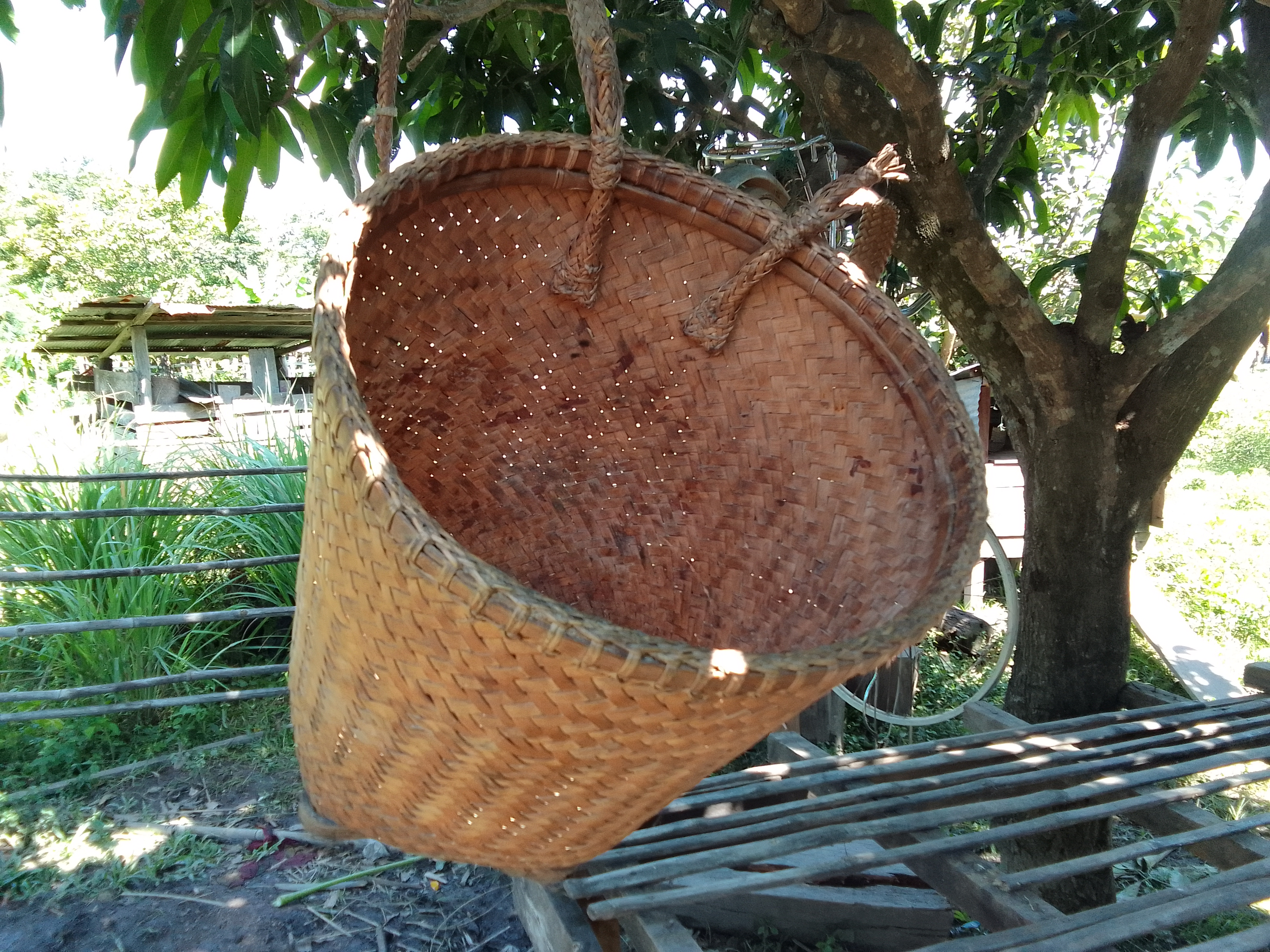
A carrying bag from Mondolkiri as seen from above

== Related articles ==
- Doko (basket), traditional Nepalese carrying basket
