= Doko, Pakistan =

Village in Gilgit-Baltistan, Pakistan

Doko ڈوکو
- Village
- Location within Gilgit Baltistan Location within Pakistan
- Coordinates: 35.49°N 75.24°E
- Country: Pakistan
- Province: Gilgit-Baltistan
- District: Shigar District
- Elevation: 2,400 m (7,900 ft)

Population (2017)
  - Total: 1,200
  - Estimate: 1,000

Languages
  - Official: Urdu, Balti
- Time zone: UTC+5 (PST)

Doko is a small village in Gilgit-Baltistan, Pakistan, located along the Shigar Valley in the Baltistan region. It is part of Shigar District and lies near the Shigar River, serving as a waypoint for travelers heading towards Skardu City.

The village is situated in a mountainous region, with an estimated elevation of 2,400 meters (7,874 feet) above sea level. It is surrounded by rugged terrain and steep valleys, characteristic of the Karakoram Range.

Doko is primarily inhabited by the Balti people, an ethnic group native to the region. The Balti language is the most widely spoken. The estimated population of Doko is between 800 and 1,200 people. Doko experiences a cold desert climate, with extreme temperature variations between summer and winter. The economy of Doko is based on subsistence farming and livestock rearing.
