= Doko (basket) =

Traditional bamboo basket from Nepal

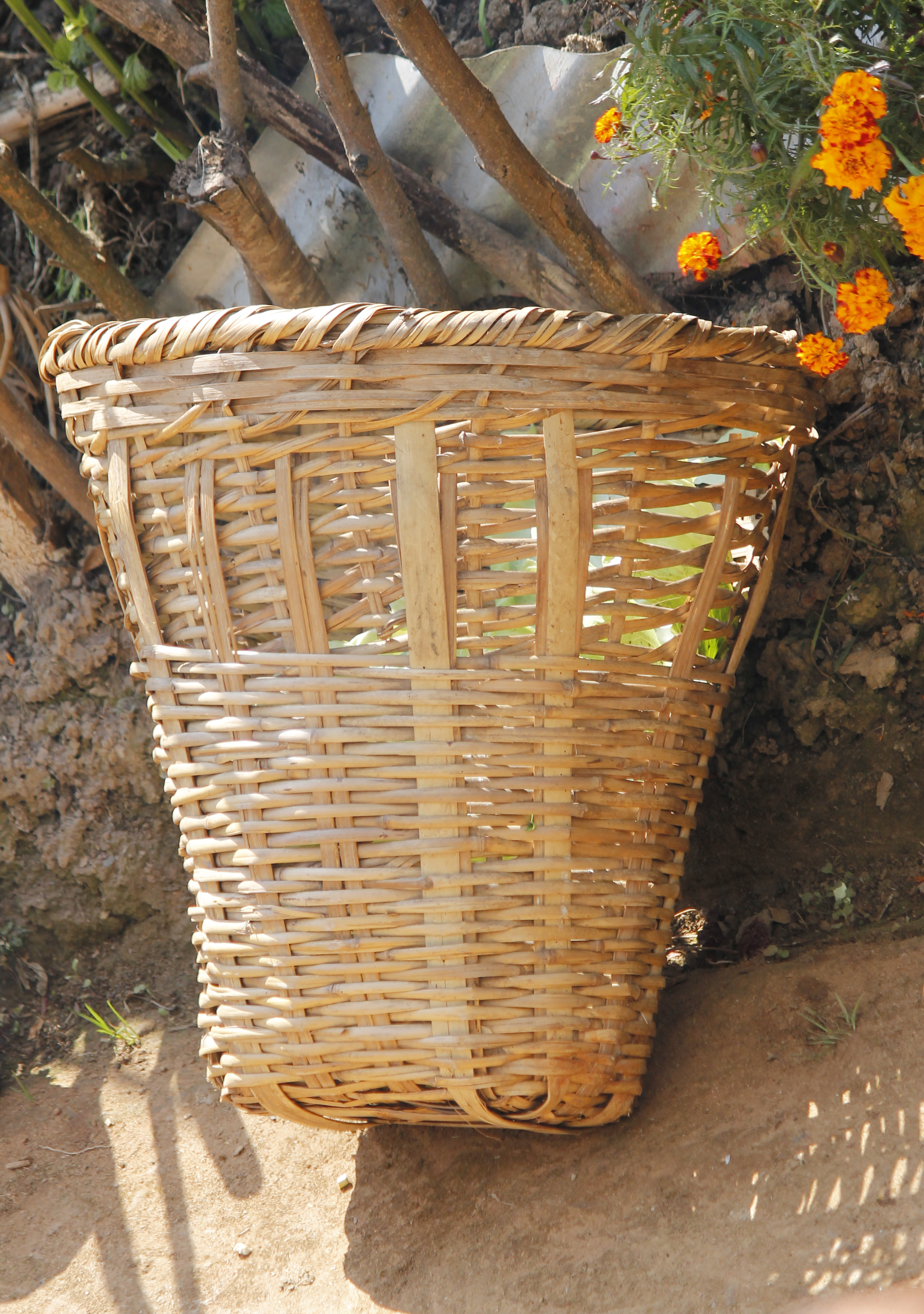
Doko, a bamboo basket used in Nepal.

Doko (Nepali: डोको) is a type of basket made from bamboo. It is hand-woven into a conical or "V" shaped structure. Dokos are especially used by porters to carry goods in Nepal, and other mountainous regions.

== Materials ==
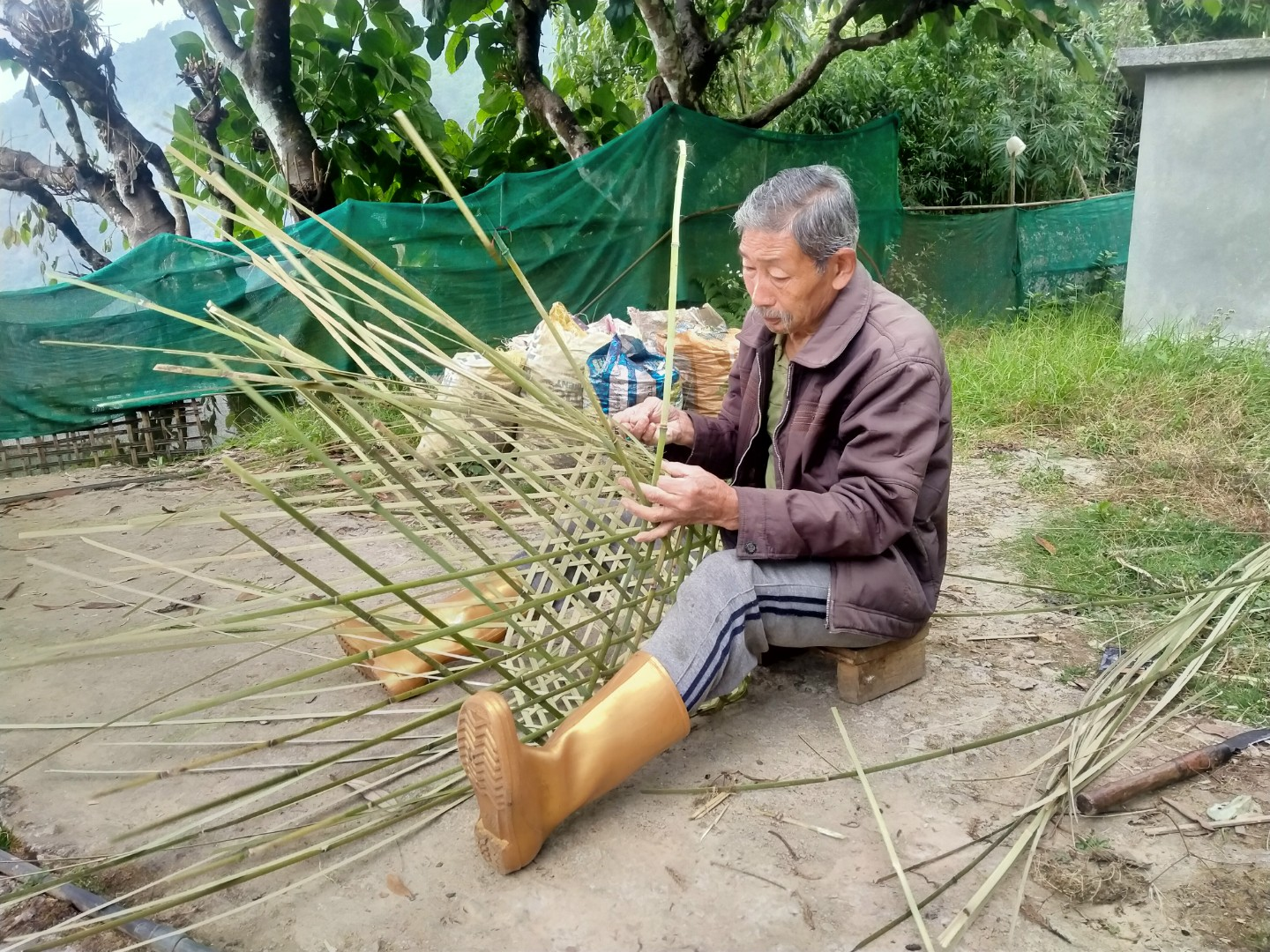
Nepali man making a doko.

Dokos are made from dried bamboo strips, which are valued for their strength, flexibility, and durability in harsh weather conditions. The weaving is traditionally done by hand, often using simple tools such as knives or scissors to split and shape the bamboo.

== Traditional uses ==
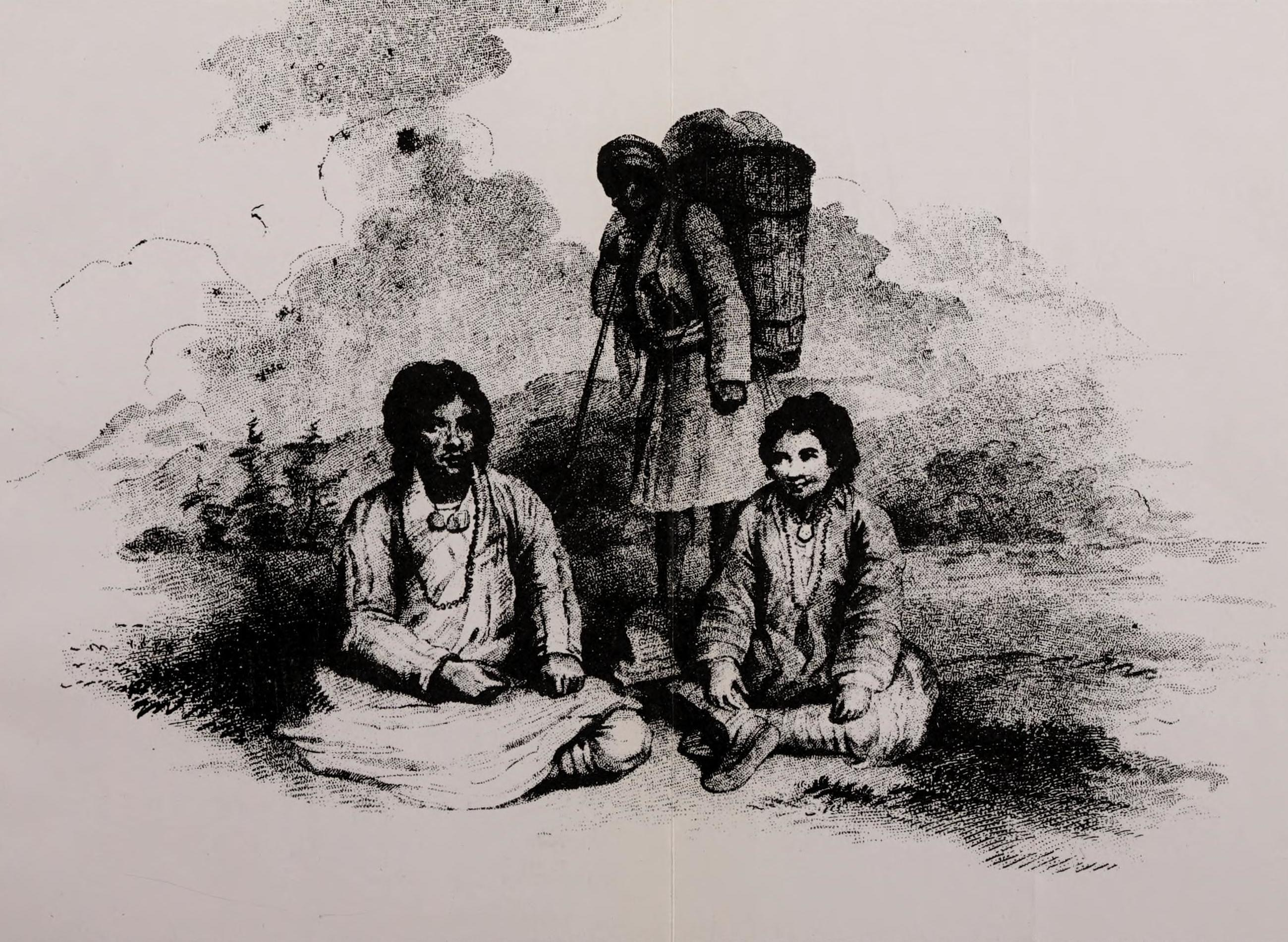
Nepali people with a doko, 1793 (published 1811).

Dokos typically have a volume of around 0.1 to 0.2 m^{3}, allowing an average person to carry loads of 20–50kg. They are fitted with a head strap known as namlo (Nepali: नाम्लो) and sometimes soldier strap, which can help distribute weight and reduce strain on carry.

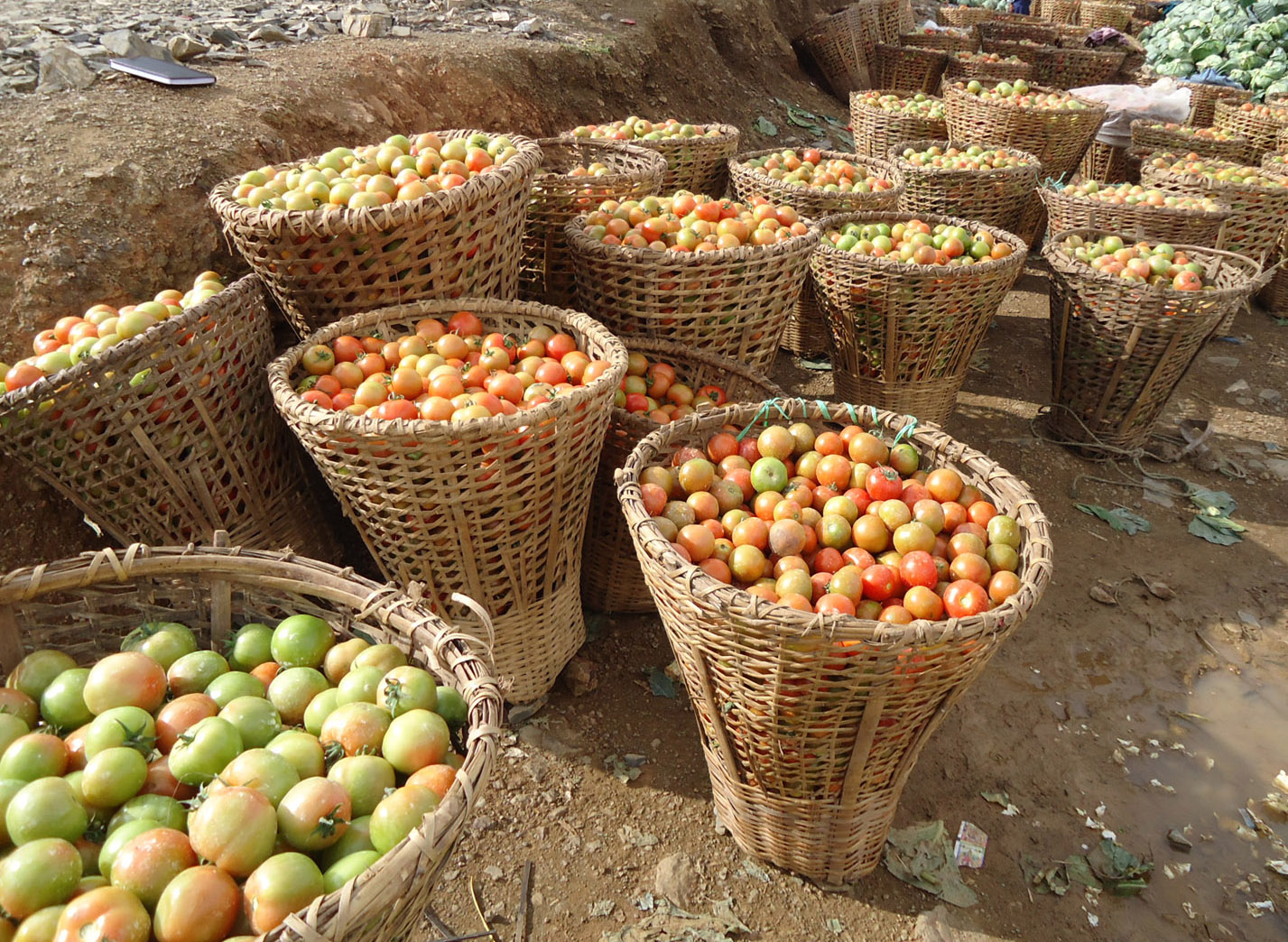
Dokos filled with tomatoes.

Dokos are used for transporting a wide range of goods, including vegetables, firewood, grass for cattle, and other agricultural products. They are also occasionally used to carry small animals and poultry, and can serve as temporary cages for animal babies. In areas without motorable roads, larger dokos are sometimes used to transport people who are unable to walk long distances.

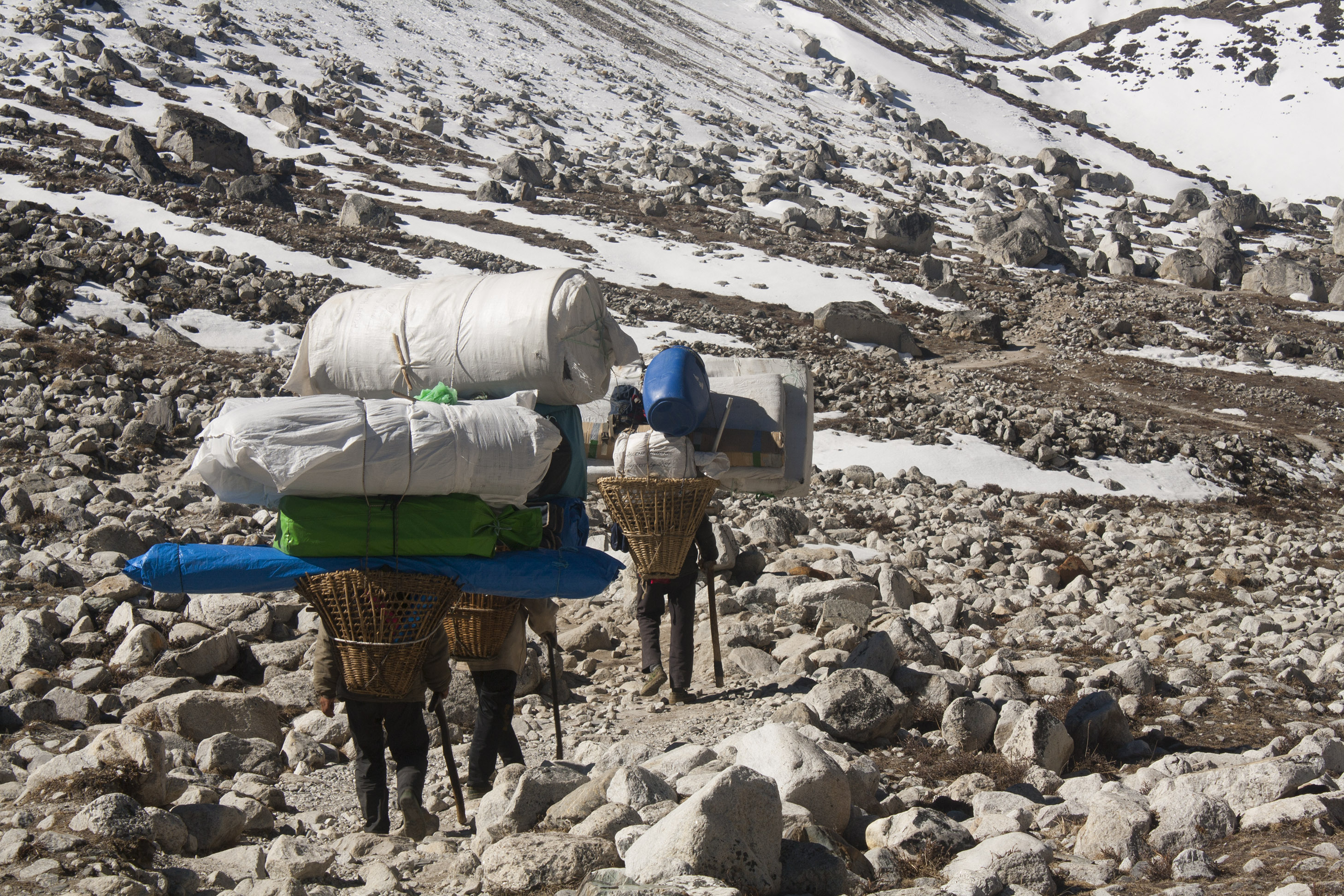
Nepali porters carrying dokos, Lobuche.

Doko-making is also a source of income in many rural communities. In Nepal, training programs have included basket weaving skills, including doko production, as a means of livelihood support for visually impaired people. In rural areas of Nepal, the doko remains a widely used traditional tool for carrying heavy loads.

== Use in military selection ==
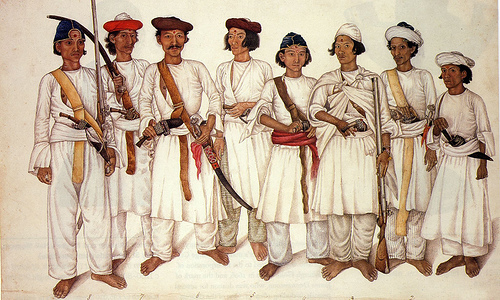
Nepalese Gurkha soldiers, 1815.

Doko has become an iconic part of the Gurkha selection process. In the traditional recruitment trials for Nepali soldiers serving in the Brigade of Gurkhas of the British Army and the Gurkha Contingent of the Singapore Police Force, candidates are required to carry heavy loads in a doko on their backs using a head strap (namlo), and complete long, steep uphill and downhill marches within strict time limits. This test is designed to simulate the physically demanding conditions soldiers encounter in rugged, mountainous terrain and on the battlefield. The weight carried in the doko can be extremely heavy, and the challenging routes quickly reveal a candidate’s stamina, strength, and determination. This practice is long-standing element of Gurkha recruitment traditions, which has developed over generations since 1815.

== See also ==
- Nanglo (नाङ्लो) – A large, flat woven tray used for drying grains, cleaning rice, and sorting food items; very common in households.
- Dalo (डालो) – A Nepalese basket used for storing and carrying grains, vegetables, and household items.
- Thunse (थुन्से) – A smaller bamboo basket used by Nepalese communities, often for carrying lighter loads, food, or supplies.
- Bhakari (भकारी) – A large cylindrical storage container made of bamboo or wood, used for storing grains like rice and maize for long periods.
