= Dōkō =

Japanese gay men's magazine

Dōkō (同好) is a Japanese gay men's magazine published exclusively for members of Dōkō Shumi no Kai (同好趣味の会), a gay men's group founded in Osaka, Japan, around October 1959. It started publication in 1960 under the title Dōsei (同性), and the title was changed to Dōkō (同好) from the fourth issue. Under the editorship of Seiichi Mōri (毛利晴一 Mōri Seiichi), who had been also involved with a conservative political organization, the magazine's circulation reached over 1,000 at its peak. The title of the magazine was changed to Seishin (清心) around 1968.

According to an article Junan no 16-nichikan (受難の16日間) by the editor, published in issue 30/31, the police raided his office and confiscated all the materials related to the magazine. He was imprisoned and interrogated for 16 days. The police concluded that the past issues of the magazine had contained obscenity and that it was possibly illegal that the magazine sold homoerotic photos to the subscribers.
