= Nanglo =

Tray for winnowing

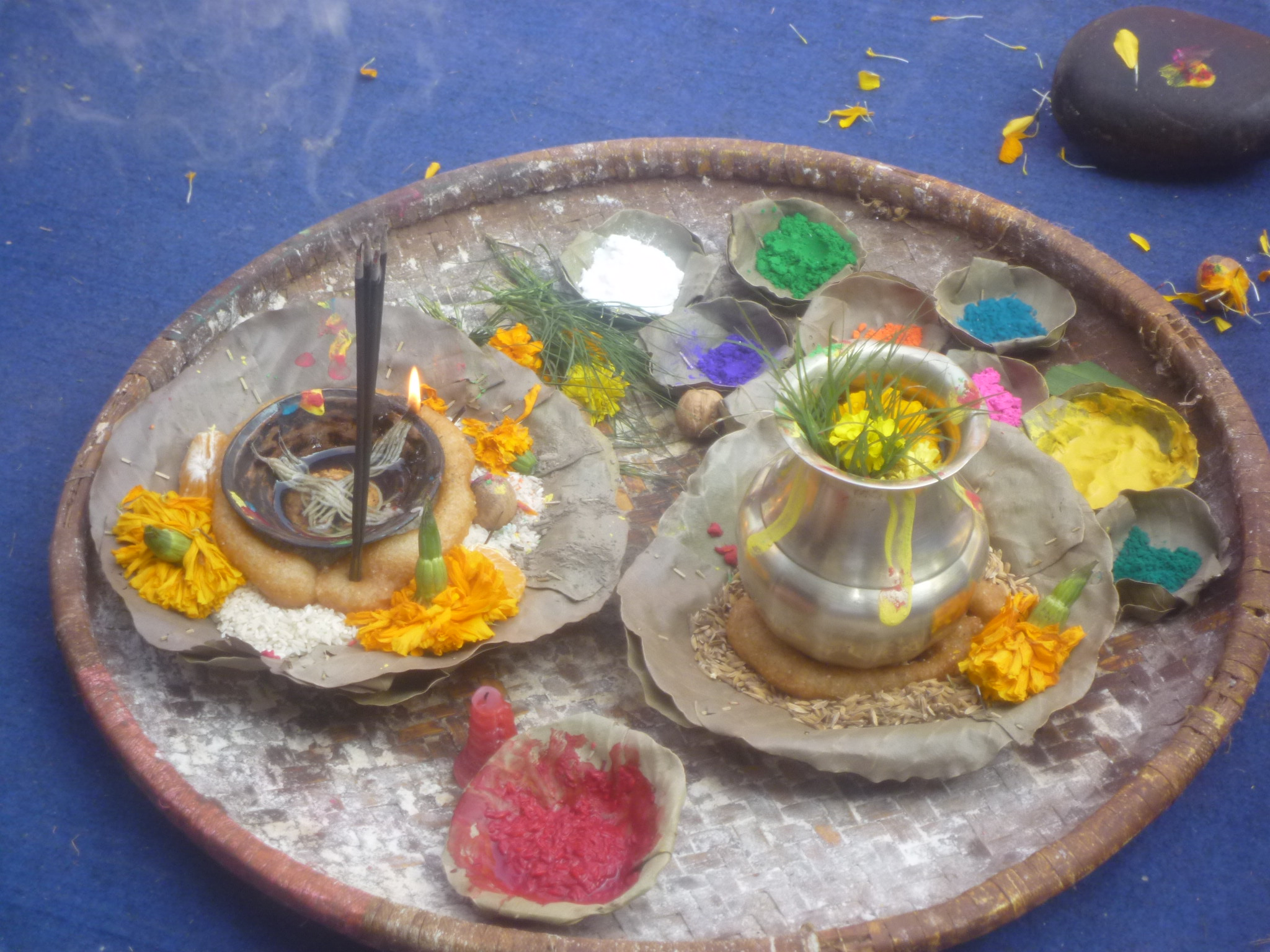
Nanglo is also used for cultural purposes.

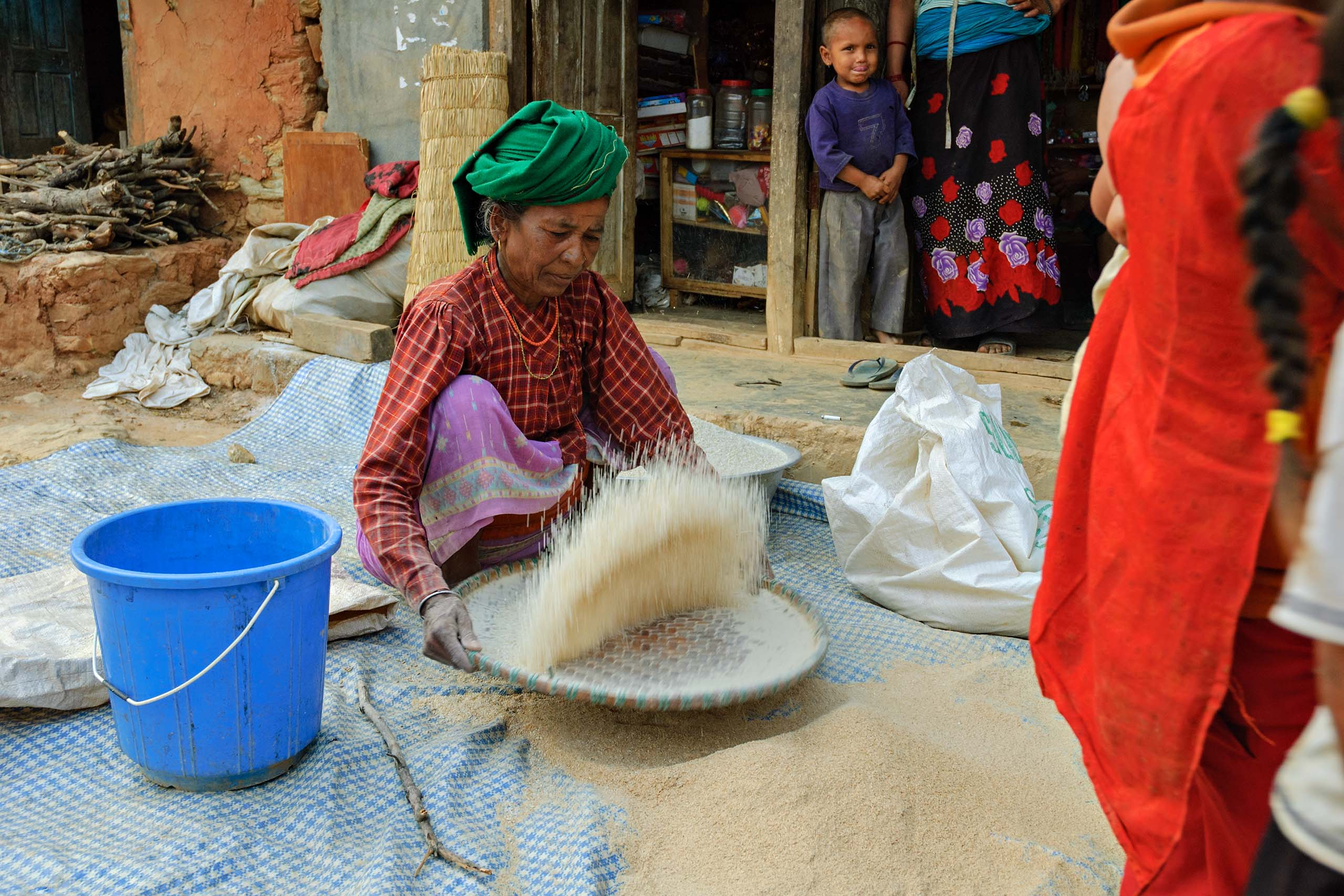
A woman sitting on the ground uses a nanglo to winnow rice in Dhading, Nepal

A nanglo (Nepali: नाङ्लो; pronounced [naŋlo]) is a flat round woven tray made of bamboo used in Nepal. It is traditionally made of thin bamboo strips woven to make a flat surface, then a firm bamboo rim is attached.

It is used for winnowing, that is, to sift grain and to separate dust and chaff from paddy, rice, dal, beans, and other cereals.

Nanglos are an indispensable part of Nepali kitchens. While mostly limited to villages, they can occasionally be found in large cities as well.
