= Duan language (Austroasiatic) =

Austroasiatic language spoken in Southeast Asia

Duan
- Halang Doan
- Native to: Laos, Vietnam
- Native speakers: (5,000 cited 2000–2007)
- Language family: Austroasiatic: Bahnaric; North; (unclassified); Duan

Language codes
- ISO 639-3: hld
- Glottolog: hala1253
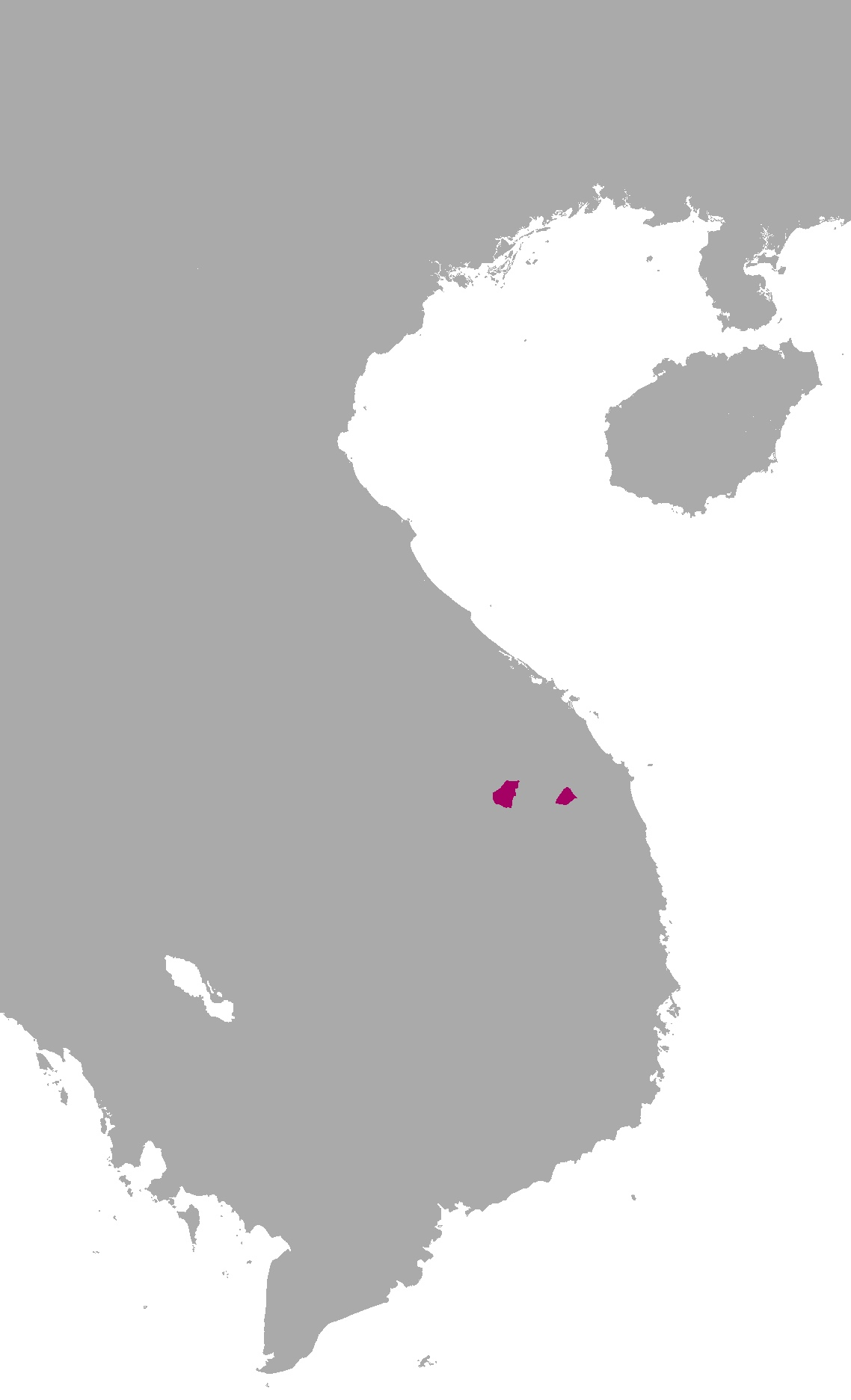

Duan, Doan, or Halang Doan, is a language spoken by more than 4,000 people on either side of the Laotian–Vietnamese border. There are some 2,346 speakers in Attopu Province, Laos, and another couple of thousand in Kon Tum Province, Vietnam. It is too poorly known to classify completely and may be mutually intelligible with Takua, Kayong, Halang, and Rengao. Might be a part of the Xơ Ɖăng ethnic group.
