= Stieng =

Stieng (also spelled Xtieng or Xtiêng) may refer to:

- The Stieng people, an ethnic minority of Cambodia and Vietnam
- Stieng language, the Austro-Asiatic language of the Stieng people
