= Tampuan language =

Austroasiatic language spoken in Cambodia

Tampuan
- Tumpoon តំពួន
- Native to: Cambodia
- Ethnicity: Tampuan people
- Native speakers: 31,000 (2008 census) to 57,000 (2013 survey)
- Language family: Austroasiatic: Bahnaric; Central; Tampuan
- Writing system: Khmer

Language codes
- ISO 639-3: tpu
- Glottolog: tamp1251
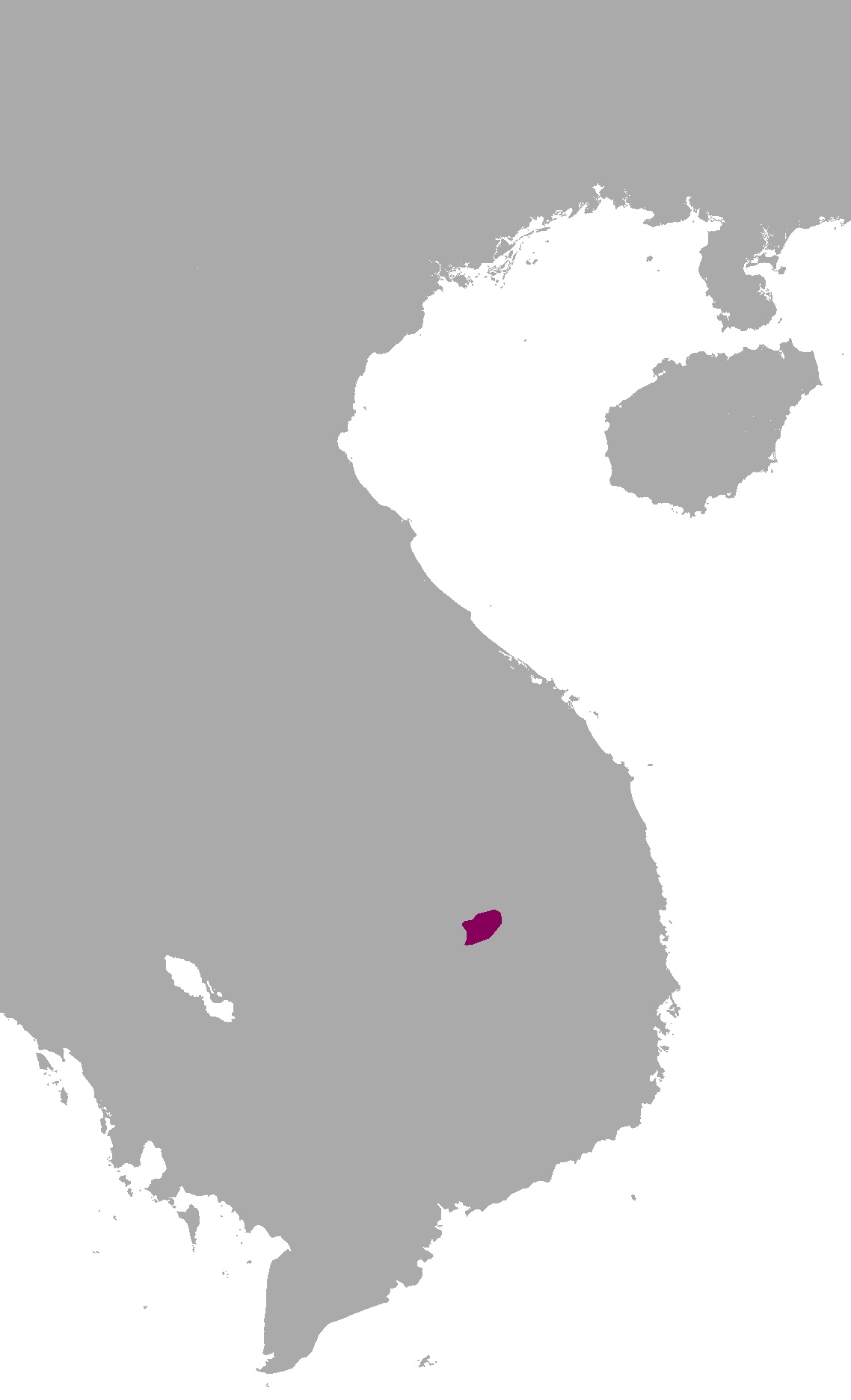

Tampuan is the language of Tampuan people indigenous to the mountainous regions of Ratanakiri Province in Cambodia. As of the 2008 census there were 31,000 speakers, which amounts to 21% of the province's population. It is closely related to Bahnar and Alak, the three of which form the Central Bahnaric language grouping within the Mon-Khmer language family according to traditional classification. Sidwell's more recent classification groups Tampuan on an equal level with Bahnar and the South Bahnaric languages in a larger Central Bahnar group. The Tampuan language has no native writing. EMU International began linguistic research in 1995 and produced an alphabet using Khmer letters. The alphabet was further refined by linguists from International Cooperation for Cambodia (ICC) and the Ministry of Education, Youth, and Sport (MOEYS). The modified Khmer script was approved by MOEYS in 2003 for use in bilingual education programs for Tampuan implemented by ICC, UNESCO, and CARE .

== Geographic distribution ==
Map of Ratanakiri Province

The vast majority of Tampuan speakers live in a contiguous zone that runs approximately north-east from Lumphat past the provincial capital of Banlung to the Tonle San river near the Vietnamese border. This region lies north-west of the area inhabited by speakers of the unrelated Jarai language with whom the Tampuan maintain close ties. A much smaller population of about 400 Tampuan speakers lives 20 miles to the north of Banlung, down the Tonle San river, separated from their brethren by Brao speakers.

== Dialects ==
Three dialects of Tampuan have been identified. The Tampuan spoken in the larger region forms a dialect continuum with Western Tampuan at the south-west extreme and Eastern Tampuan found in the north-east. These two dialects show only a small difference in phonology. However, the Northern dialect spoken by a much smaller, more isolated community near the town of Ka Choun is more divergent both in phonology and lexicon, possibly due to greater influence from the neighboring Lao language. Native speakers report that all three dialects are mutually intelligible. The dialect used for this description is the most-studied Western Tampuan as spoken around the town of Banlung.

== Phonology ==
Similar to many Mon-Khmer languages, Tampuan employs clear (modal) vowels and lax (breathy) vowels. However the existence of relatively few minimal pairs in which difference in register or phonation is the sole difference in two words led Huffman to categorize Tampuan as a “transitional language” rather than a register language. Crowley, on the other hand, cites extensive diphthongization, especially in the Eastern Dialect, as a sign that Tampuan has crossed the threshold into the category of a register language and is possibly in the process of evolving to Huffman's final phase, namely, a “restructured” language exemplified by modern Khmer.

=== Consonants ===
The 28 consonant phonemes of the Tampuan language are laid out in the table below as reported by Crowley. All may occur as initial consonants while only the phonemes in the colored cells may occur as a syllable coda.

		Bilabial	Dental/Alveolar		Palatal	Velar	Glottal
Plosive	Aspirated	pʰ	tʰ			kʰ	
Plosive	Voiceless	p	t		c	k	ʔ
Plosive	Voiced, Preglottalized	ʔb	ʔd				
Nasal	Voiceless	m̥	n̥		ɲ̥		
Nasal	Voiced	m	n		ɲ	ŋ	
Fricative	Voiceless		[s]*		ç		h
Approximant	Voiceless		l̥	r̥			
Approximant	Voiced	w	l	r	j		
Approximant	Preglottalized	ʔw	ʔl		ʔj		

*[s] sometimes occurs as an allophonic variant of syllable-initial [ç]

=== Vowels ===
The vowels of Tampuan show a two-way register contrast between lax and modal voicings as well as length (duration) contrast. As with other Bahnaric languages, tense vowels occur significantly more often than lax vowels. Seventy-five percent of dictionary words use tense vowels. As can be seen in the chart below, the vowels are unevenly distributed. For example, the short lax close vowels have no tense equivalents. Also, there are more close lax vowels than open. Crowley notes that the tense vowels show a trend toward diphthongization in the close range while in the open vowels, it is the lax sounds that are diphthongs, a pattern well documented in historical stages of Khmer and Brao that indicates the language is possibly in an evolutionary stage of restructuring away from a register language.

		Front		Central		Back	
		short	long	short	long	short	long
Close	lax	i̤	i̤ː	ɨ̤	ɨ̤ː	ṳ	ṳː
Close	tense		əi		əɨ		ou
Close-mid	lax				ə̤ː		
Close-mid	tense		eː	ə	aə	o	oː
Open-mid	lax	ɛ̤	ɛ̤ː			ɔ̤	ṳa
Open-mid	tense	ɛ	ɛː			ɔ	ɔː
Open	lax			a̤	i̤a		
Open	tense		ai	a	aː		ao

In addition to the vowels above, the tense diphthong ɨə can be found in Lao borrowings and personal names. The lax vowels [i̤a] and [ṳa] have the allophones [i̤ɛ] and [ṳɛ], especially in the southern Western dialect. Short [a̤] also has a slightly diphthongized allophone [əɛ̤]. The tense vowel [əi] varies to [ʌi] or [oi], depending on dialect.

=== Syllable structure ===
Tampuan words can either be monosyllabic or exhibit the typical Mon-Khmer “sesquisyllabic” pattern of a main syllable preceded by an unstressed “pre-syllable”. The maximal word is represented by C(R)v(N)-C(C)V(C) where “C” is a consonant, “R” is /r/, “v” is an unstressed vowel, “N” is a nasal, /l/ or /r/, and “V” can be any of the vowel nuclei listed above. The pre-syllable and the components in parentheses are optional (not necessary for proper word formation) and the final “C” is limited to the phonemes noted above. In many words the pre-syllable, being unstressed, is further reduced to a syllabic nasal or, in Crowley's terms, a “nasal presyllable” represented as a glottal stop followed by a nasal as in /ʔntrɛ̤ː/ “pestle” or /ʔmm̥ao/ “stone”.

== Numbers ==
The numbers in Tampuan are as follows. The alternative forms for seven, nine and ten were reported by Thomas.

1
/maoɲ/
2
/pi̤ar/
3
/paiŋ/
4
/pwan/
5
/prəta̤m/
6
/trao/
7
/ʔmpaəh/
(/pə̤h/)
8
/təŋhaːm/
9
/ʔŋçən/
(/nsi̤n/)
10
/ʔŋci̤t/
(/tsit/)
11 /ci̤t maoɲ/
20 / pi̤ar ci̤t/

-30 (paiŋ ci̤t) -40 (pwan ci̤t) -50 (prəta̤m ci̤t) -60 (trao ci̤t) -70 (ʔmpaəh ci̤t) -80 (təŋhaːm ci̤t) -90 (ʔŋçən ci̤t)

100
/rəja̤ŋ/
1000
/rəpṳː/
