= Khom script (Ong Kommadam) =

Writing system used by a religious rebellion in Laos

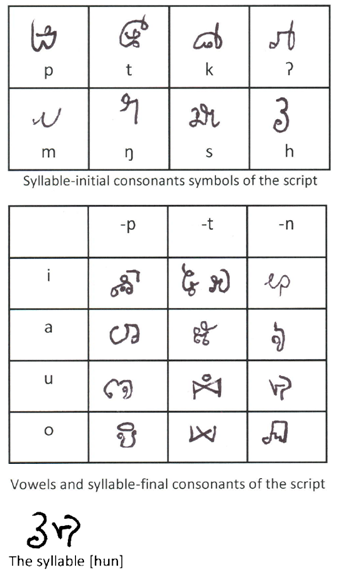
Samples of symbols from the Khom script, showing how it creates syllables

The Khom script (Note: There are two scripts in Southeast Asia called Khom script. This article describes the obscure script from Laos that Sidwell (2008) and Jacq (2001) have described under the name "Khom script", not to be confused with the Khom Thai script.) is a writing system created by Ong Kommadam that was formerly used in Laos. The term "Khom" is also used to refer to the adaptation of the Khmer script used in Thailand to inscribe sacred Buddhist mantras and prayers, but neither the Khom Thai and Ong's Khom script are related to each other.

== History ==
The script was invented by Ong Kommadam, a leader in the rebellion against the French colonizers. He began using the script as early as 1924, but its use did not continue after his death in 1936. Ong Kommadam claimed supernatural titles, including “King of the Khom”, “God of the Khom”, “Sky God of the Khom” (Sidwell 2008:17). The script was linked to his divine claims, messages written in this script carried mystical power as well as meaning. The script was invented by Ong Kommandam for conveying secret messages that could not be deciphered by the French or Siamese forces that had divided Laos. He had taken over as leader after the death of Ong Kèo during the Holy Man's Rebellion. As Ong Kommandam and many of his closest followers were speakers of Bahnaric languages spoken in southern Laos, most of the known texts in the language were written in Alak, as well as in the Bahnaric Loven languages of Juk, Su' and Jru', with some in Lao.

The script was revealed to outsiders by old, dying insiders on two occasions (Sidwell 2008:18). Although the word Khom originally referred to the Khmer, it was later applied to related Austroasiatic peoples such as the Lao Theung, many of which had supported Ong Kammandam.

== Characteristics ==
This Khom script is unusual in the way it divides syllables. It has one set of symbols to represent initial consonants, then it uses another set of symbols to represent the final vowel and consonant. That is, unlike a syllabary (which has unitary symbols for consonants followed by vowels—CV, with a vowelless consonant occasionally following by), Khom script divides the syllable as C-VC, rather than CV-C (Sidwell 2008). This onset-rime division does not exist in the majority of the existing typologies of scripts outside Zhuyin Fuhao.

Some of the symbols resemble those from nearby scripts, but many are original. The script contains more than 300 characters in order to fully encompass the rich morphology of the Bahnaric languages. Although the shapes of the letters have a superficial resemblance to several writing systems in the area, it was not related to any of them.

The script could be used to write various Bahnaric languages, including the Laven dialects, especially Jru', and languages like Alak, Ong Kommadam's native language.
