= Khom script =

Khom script may refer to either of the following writing systems derived from the Khmer script:

- Khom Thai script, a script based on Khmer script and historically used in Thailand
- Khom script (Ong Kommadam), a script developed in Laos by the rebel leader Ong Kommadam in the 1920s
