= Kavet =

Kavet may be,

- Kavet language
- Gregg Kavet
