= Duan language =

Duan language may refer to:

- Duan language (Austroasiatic), a language of Laos and Vietnam
- Duan language (Para-Mongolic), an extinct language of China
