= Su' language =

Austroasiatic language spoken in Laos

Su'
- Native to: Laos
- Native speakers: (2,400 cited 2000)
- Language family: Austroasiatic: Bahnaric; West; Laven; Su'
- Writing system: Lao script, Khom script

Language codes
- ISO 639-3: sqq
- Glottolog: souu1238

Su' (autonym: ɟruʔ; or Suq) is a Mon–Khmer language of the Bahnaric branch spoken in Attapeu Province, Laos. The 1995 Attapeu census recorded a population of only 124 speakers in Sanamsay District. Su' autonyms are identical with that of the Jru' (known to the Lao as Laven), but they consider themselves to be a separate ethnic group (Sidwell 2003:19). There could also possibly be speakers in Stung Treng Province, Cambodia.

Su' speakers live in villages on both sides of Route 18, from Ban Chanto to about 10 km before Ban Mai.
