= Palau language =

Palau language may refer to:

- Palauan language
- the Palau dialect of Lave language
- Languages of Palau
