= JEG =

JEG may refer to:

- Jeg Coughlin Jr. (born 1970), American motorsports driver
- Aasiaat Airport, in Greenland
- Cheng language
