= Tariang language =

Austroasiatic language spoken in Laos

Taliang
- Trieng
- Kasseng
- Native to: Laos
- Ethnicity: Gie-Trieng
- Native speakers: 45,000 (2005)
- Language family: Austroasiatic: Bahnaric; Central; Taliang

Language codes
- ISO 639-3: Variously: tdf – Talieng stg – Trieng tgr – Tareng
- Glottolog: trie1243 Trieng

Taliang (Tariang, Talieng, Trieng) is a Bahnaric language spoken by the Jeh-Tariang people of Laos and Vietnam. It is possibly related to the Stieng language of Vietnam and Cambodia.

There are various languages that have gone by the name Taliang/Trieng, which means 'headhunters'; SEALang classifies two of these as dialects of the same language as Kasseng.
