= Juk =

Juk, JuK, or JUK may refer to:

- Juk (Korean food), Korean rice porridge
- Juk language, a Mon–Khmer language spoken in Laos
- JuK, software
- Ukkusissat Heliport (IATA: JUK), in Greenland
- Wapan language (ISO 639-3: juk), a Jukunoid language of Nigeria

== See also ==
- Congee, East Asian rice porridge, pronounced [tsʊ́k] in Cantonese and romanized jook [d͡ʒʊ́k] in some Cantonese diasporic communities
