= Takua people =

Takua
Total population
- 6,000

Regions with significant populations
- Vietnam

Languages
- Takua

Religion
- Traditional animism

Related ethnic groups
- Sedang, other Bahnaric speakers

The Takua people are an ethnic group of Vietnam. They live in the heavily forested mountainous regions of Quảng Nam and Quảng Ngãi provinces in Central Vietnam.
