= HRE (disambiguation) =

HRE usually refers to the Holy Roman Empire, a historic political entity in Central Europe.

HRE may also refer to:

- Hanno R. Ellenbogen Citizenship Award, an annual award ceremony
- Hrê language, a North Bahnaric language spoken in Vietnam, mainly by the H're people
- H're people, an ethnic group of Vietnam who largely speak the Hrê language
- Harare International Airport, in Zimbabwe
- Holy Roman Emperor, the leader of the Holy Roman Empire, nominally in charge of these territories
- Hormone response element, a DNA sequence within genes, involved in the regulation of the genes' expression
- Hudson River Expressway, a proposed highway in New York state, United States
- Human rights education
- Hypo Real Estate, a German holding company and commercial property lender
- Hybrid Rocket Engine, a type of rocket engine with fuel and oxidizer in different states
- Waco HRE, an American biplane
- HRE, a Rockwell scale of hardness
