= Sedang =

Sedang may refer to

- Sedang people, a people in Vietnam
  - Sedang language, what they speak.
- Kingdom of Sedang, a defunct nineteenth-century kingdom in Indochina
