= JRU =

JRU may refer to:

- José Rizal University, Philippines

== See also ==
- Jru' language, language in Laos
- Jrue, given name
