= Raʼong language =

Bahnaric language spoken in Cambodia

Raʼong
- Native to: Cambodia
- Language family: Austroasiatic: Bahnaric; South Bahnaric; Stieng?; Raʼong

Language codes
- ISO 639-3: None (mis)
- Glottolog: None

Raʼong is a Bahnaric language of northeastern Cambodia. It may be a variety of Stieng, another Austroasiatic language spoken in Vietnam and Cambodia (Barr & Pawley 2013).

Raʼong is spoken in Ou Am village, Srae Khtum commune, Kaev Seima District, Mondulkiri Province, Cambodia.
