= Tampuan =

Tampuan or Tampuon may refer to:

- Tampuan people
- Tampuan language
