= Jeh-Tariang people =

Ethnic group in Vietnam

Jeh-Tariang
Jeh-Tariang/Giẻ Triêng
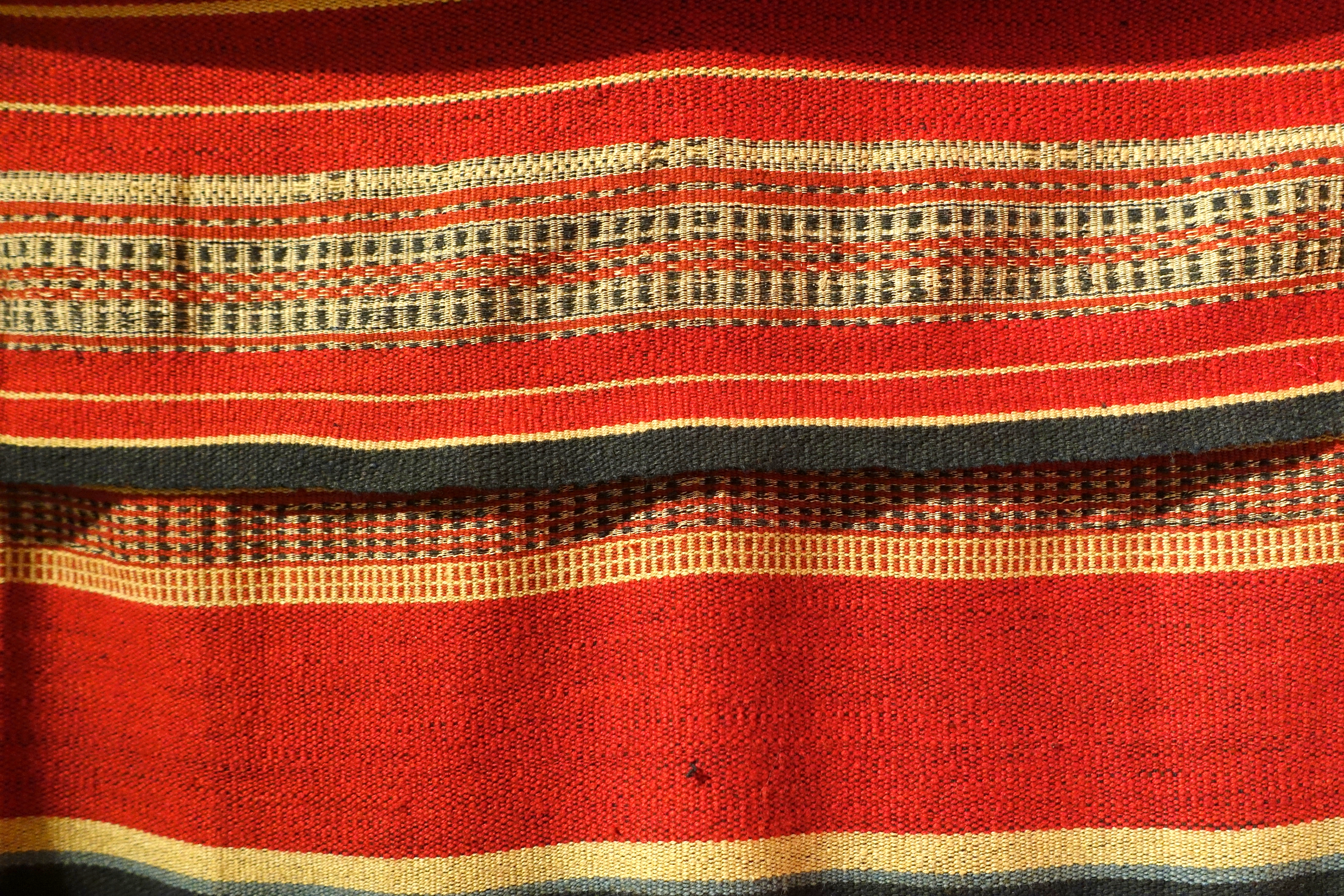

Total population
- 63,322 (2019)

Regions with significant populations
- Vietnam : Kon Tum

Languages
- Jeh and Tariang (native) • Vietnamese

Religion
- Traditional religion

The Jeh-Tariang people, also written as Gie Trieng people (Vietnamese: người Giẻ Triêng) are an ethnic group in Vietnam. Most Jeh-Tariang live in the province of Kon Tum, in Vietnam's Central Highlands region, and in 2019 the population was 63,322. They speak Jeh language and Tariang language—a part of the Mon–Khmer language family.

They practice the custom of interring bodies of the dead by hanging coffins on trees.

== Notable Jeh-Tariang ==
- A Hoàng, Vietnamese footballer

== Gallery ==
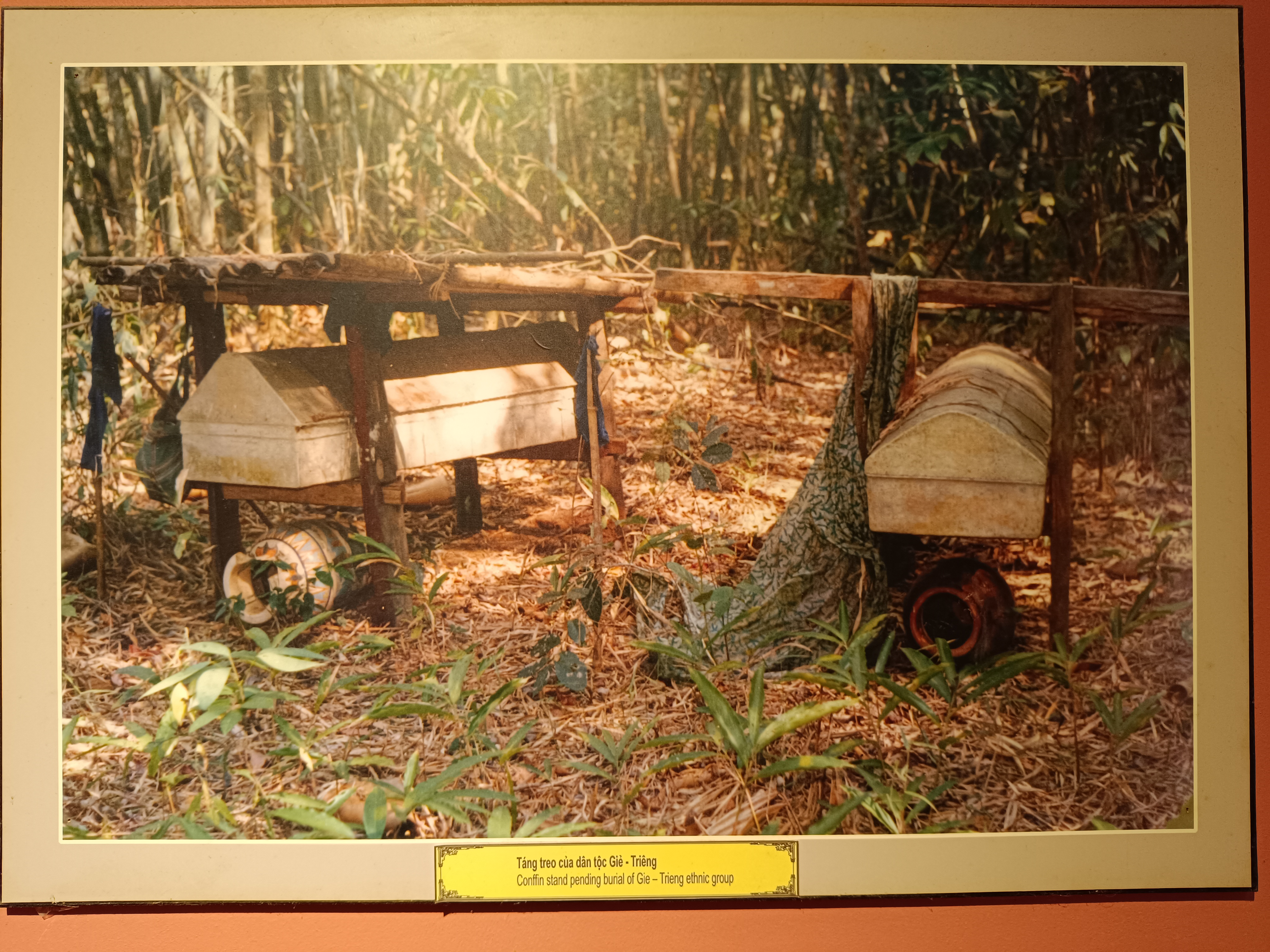
Hanging coffins
