= Koho people =

Cơ Ho
Total population
- 203,800

Regions with significant populations
- Vietnam: 200,800 (2019); Most in Central Highlands; United States: 3,000

Languages
- Vietnamese • Koho

Religion
- Animism • Christianity

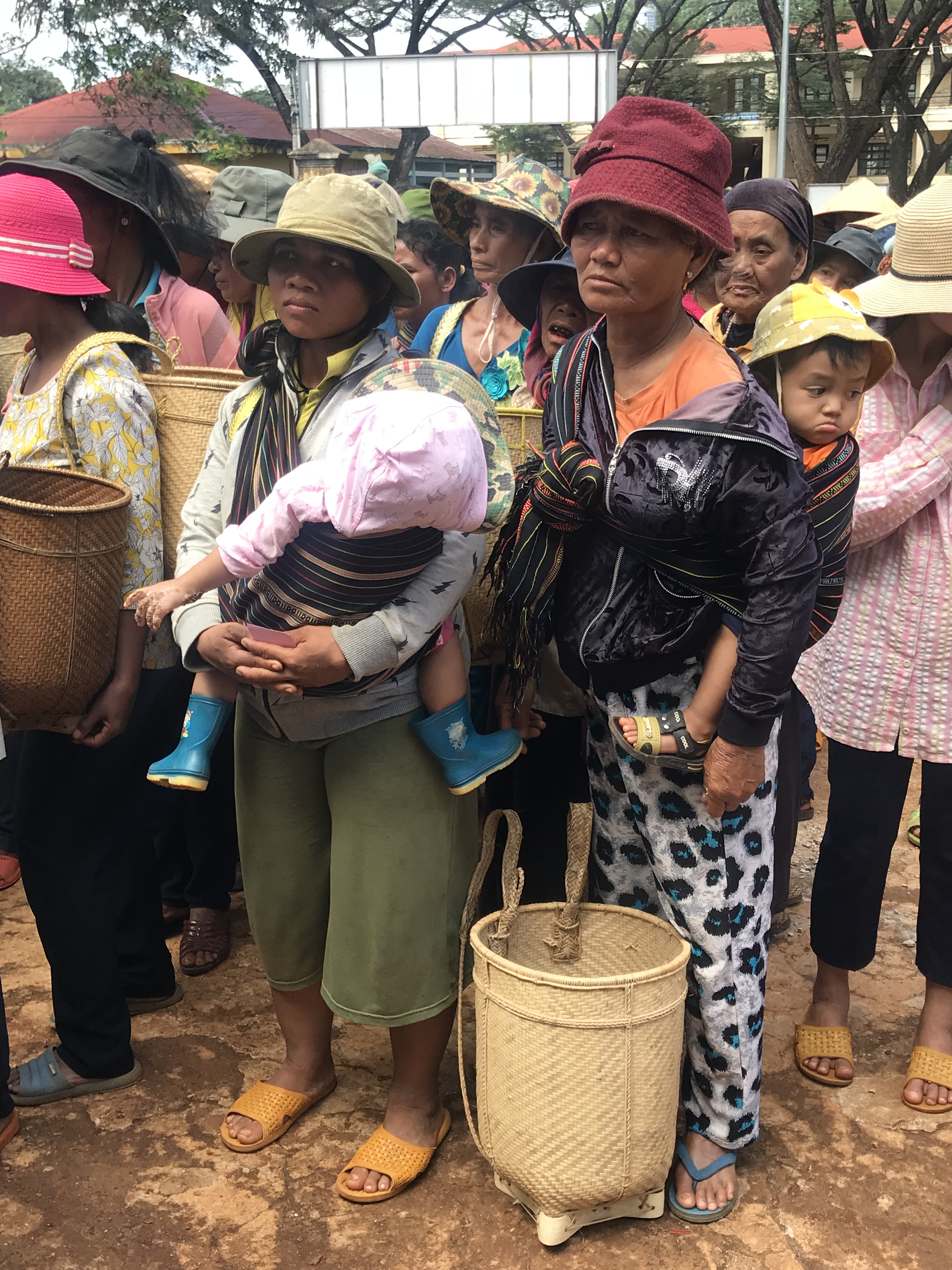
K'Ho Nop people in Gia Bắc (Ja Buk), Lâm Đồng

The K'Ho, Cơ Ho, Kaho, or Koho are an ethnic group living in the Lâm Đồng province of Vietnam's Central Highlands. They speak the K'Ho language, a southern Bahnaric branch of the Mon–Khmer language group. They are related to the Cho Ro and Mạ people.The K'ho people are the oldest ethnic group in The Southern Central Highlands of Vietnam.

The Lạch people, a subgroup of K'Ho, is the indigenous group of Lâm Đồng. The name of the city of Da Lat (Lâm Đồng's capital) originated from Đà Lạch (literally "water of the Lạch people"): now the Cam Ly stream, which eventually flows into the Đồng Nai river to the South-West of the city.

== Culture ==
They have a musical instrument called kăm boat and the dish sour gruel.

K'ho people's folk religion worships a pantheon of gods, including Yang N'Du, the Supreme God, forest god, water god, fire god... The majority of the Koho people now identify as Christian.

K'ho people also boast rich vernacular literature, such as the Epic of Gơ Plom kòn Yồi (literally "The child of Plom is Yồi").

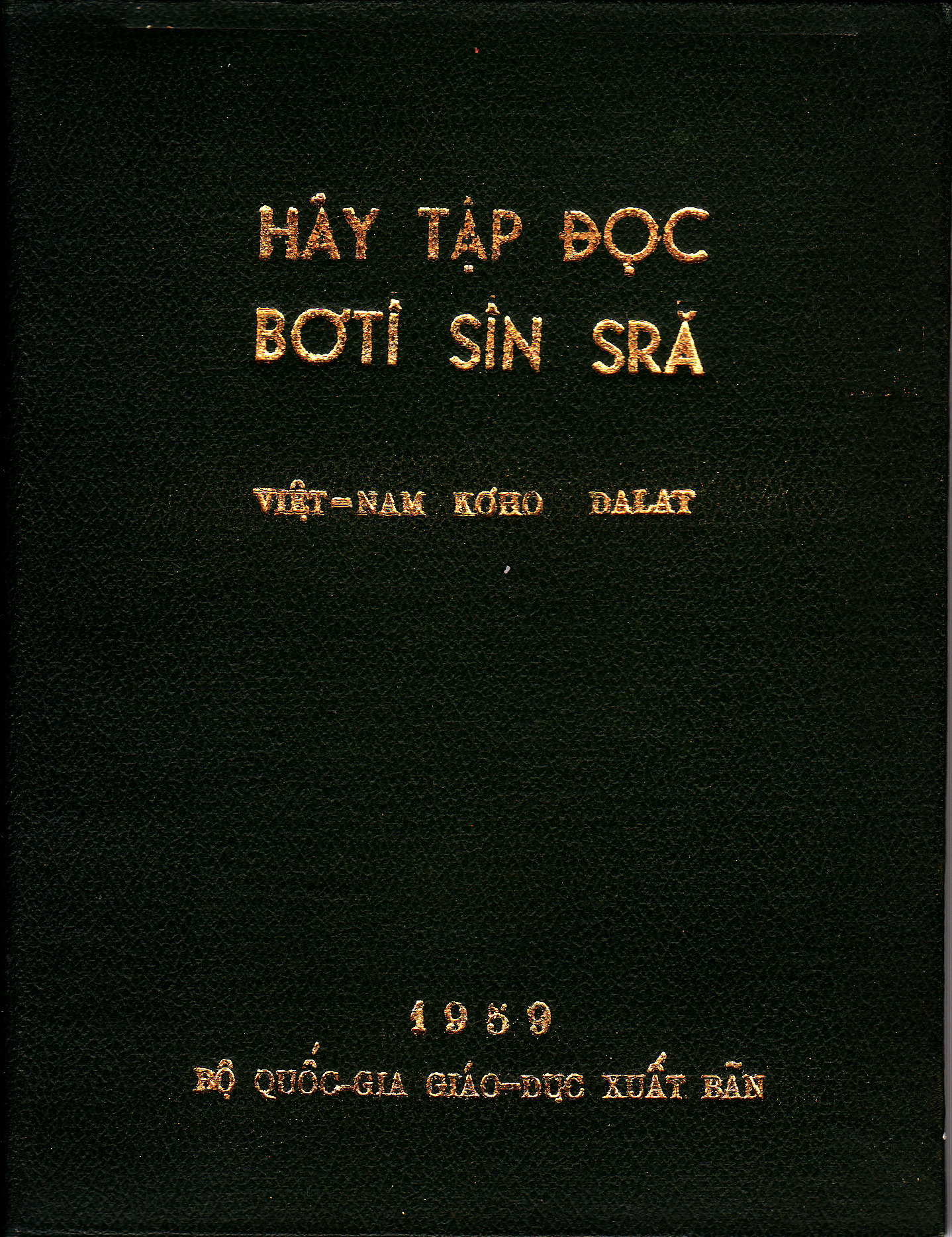
A Vietnamese- peide

== Subdivisions ==
According to Ngọc (2010:11), subdivisions of the Cơ-Ho include the following tribes.

- Srê
- Nộp
- C'don
- Cil
- Lach
- T'ring

Đưng K'nớ commune, Lạc Dương district, Lâm Đồng province has the following subdivisions (clans) (Ngọc 2010:14).

- Bon Dơng
- Rơ Ông
- K'Long
- Kơ Liêng
- Krajan
- Pang Ting
- Da-gout
- Bon Niêng
- Cil
- Liêng Hót
- Phi Srônh
- M'bon
- Kơ Să
- Đơng G
- Bon Đing
