= Jeh language =

Austroasiatic language of Vietnam and Laos

Jeh
- Gie
- Native to: Vietnam, Laos
- Ethnicity: Gie-Trieng
- Native speakers: 27,000 (2002 & 2015)
- Language family: Austroasiatic: Bahnaric; North; Jeh

Language codes
- ISO 639-3: jeh
- Glottolog: jehh1245
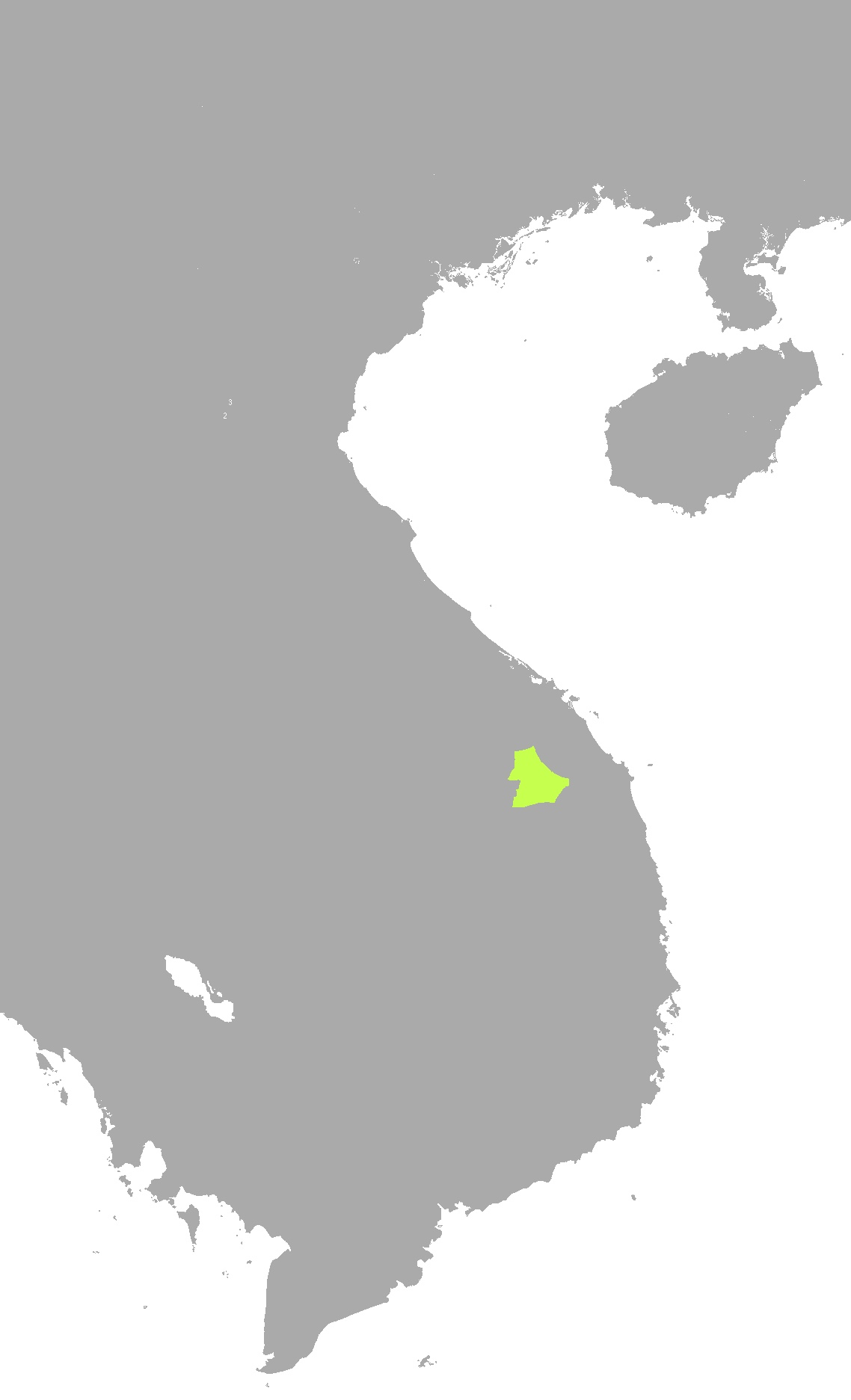

Jeh (also spelled Die, Gie, Yaeh) is a language spoken by more than fifteen thousand people in Vietnam. There are also several thousand speakers in the Laotian provinces of Xekong and Attapu.

== Sample Text ==
Few written texts of the Jeh language exist online, but in 2023, the John 3:16 project sent researchers to Jeh and translated John 3:16 into the Jeh language.

ພະເຢໂອວາວ໊າໂລກມໍ໊ໄຢ ອັນໂດ໊ກອນອັນໂກ໊ເນົາ ອັນຫງາຕາມຢີ໊ມັງອັນ(ກອນຄຼໍ) ແດ໊ຈິ໊ດ ອັນເຢງຊີວິດອະມະຕະ(ແທນ) ໂຢຮັນ 3:16
