= Monom language =

Austroasiatic language spoken in Vietnam

Monom
- Bonam
- Native to: Vietnam
- Native speakers: 6,000 (2007)
- Language family: Austroasiatic: Bahnaric; North Bahnaric; Monom

Language codes
- ISO 639-3: moo
- Glottolog: mono1268
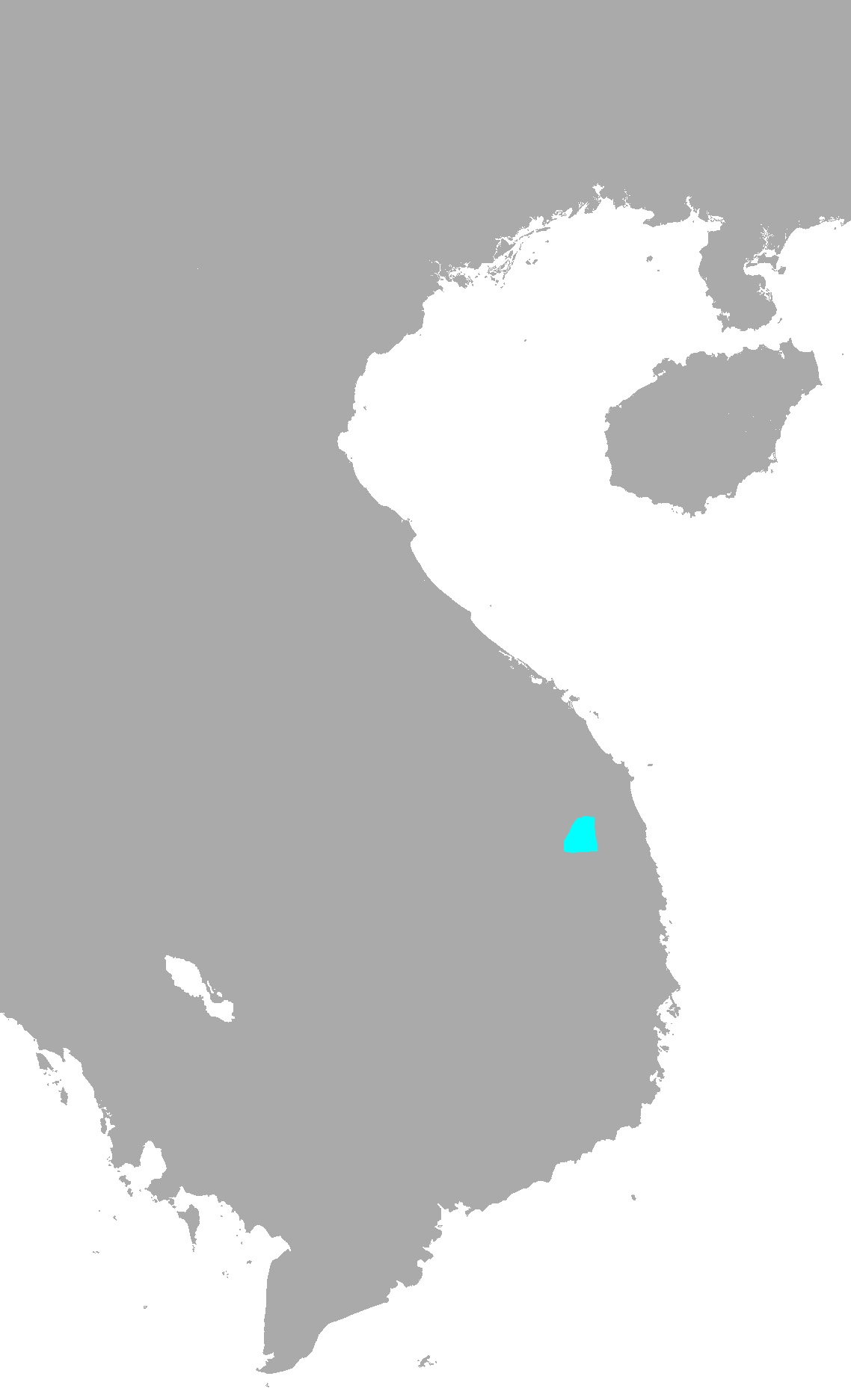

Monom (Monam), not to be confused with Bonam (a Bahnar subgroup), is an Austro-Asiatic language of Vietnam. Speakers are officially classified by the Vietnamese government as Sedang people.

Monom is spoken mostly in Kon Plông District, Kon Tum Province (Le et al. 2014:175)
