= Stieng people =

Ethnic group in Vietnam and Cambodia

Stieng
Regions with significant populations
- Vietnam: 100,752 (2019)
- Cambodia: 6,541 (2008)

Languages
- Stieng, Vietnamese, Central Mnong, Khmer

Religion
- Traditional religions, Christianity

The Stieng people (Vietnamese: Xtiêng/Stiêng) are an ethnic group of Vietnam and Cambodia. They speak Stieng, a language in the Bahnaric group of the Mon–Khmer languages.

Most Stieng live in Bình Phước Province (81,708 in 2009) of the Southeast Vietnam. In Cambodia, they are classified as a group that used to refer to non-Khmer people, under the name Khmer Loeu.
