= Todrah language =

Austroasiatic language spoken in Vietnam

Todrah
- Native to: Vietnam
- Native speakers: 6,000 (2007)
- Language family: Austroasiatic: Bahnaric; North Bahnaric; Sedang–Todrah; Todrah
- Dialects: Sodrah; Xodrah

Language codes
- ISO 639-3: tdr
- Glottolog: todr1244
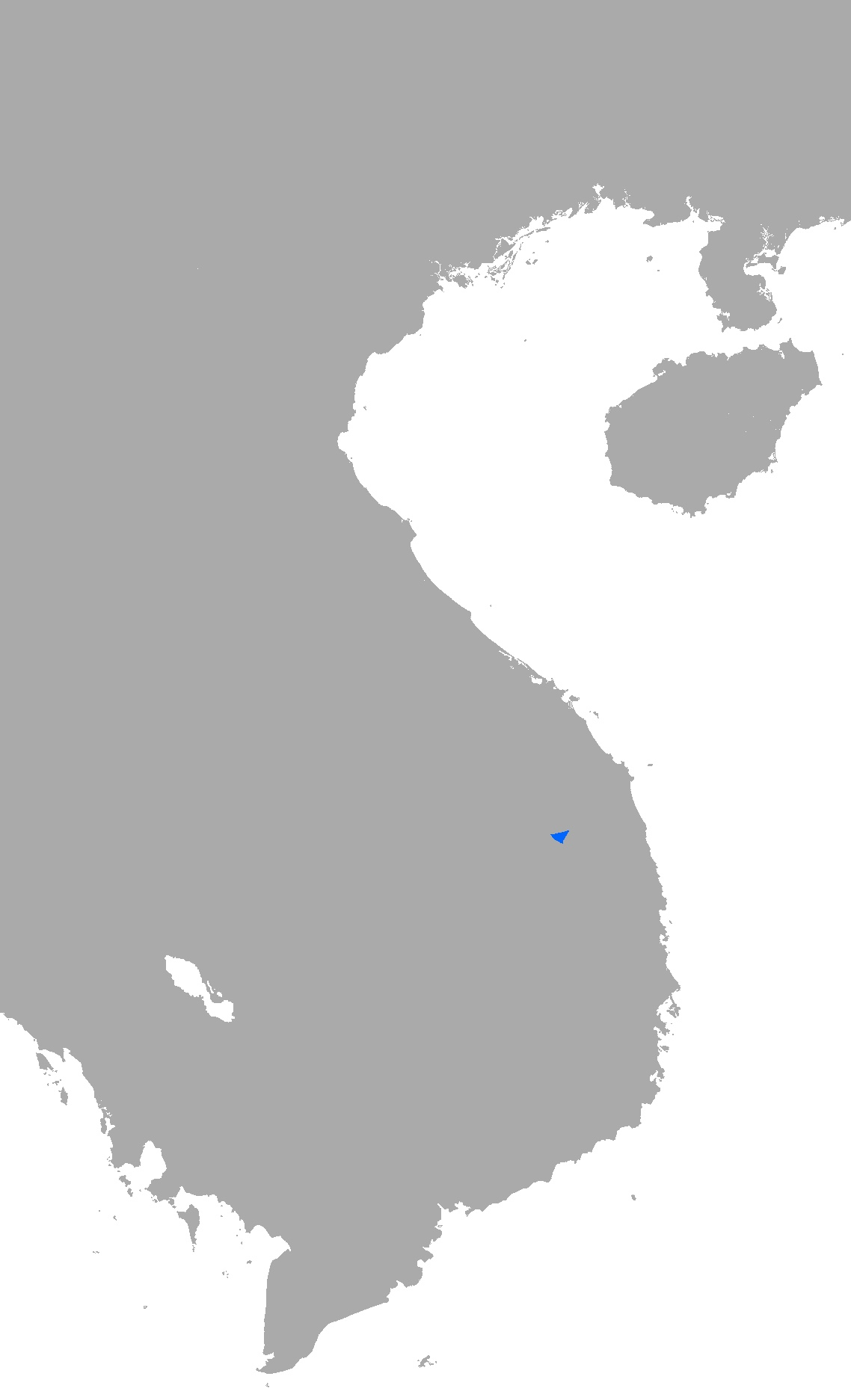

Todrah is an Austroasiatic language of Vietnam. The two dialects, Sodrah and Xodrah, are quite distinct. Speakers are officially classified by the Vietnamese government as Sedang people.

Todrah contrasts clear, breathy and laryngeal vowels.

== Distribution ==
Todrah (Sơ-Drá, Xơtrá, SơRá) is spoken in Đắk Glei District, Kon Tum town, and Kon Plông District of Kon Tum Province (Le et al. 2014:175)

According to Ethnologue, it is spoken northeast of Kon Tum city, from Kon Hring to Kon Braih.
