= Nyaheun language =

Austroasiatic language spoken in Laos

Heun
- Nyaheun
- Native to: Laos
- Native speakers: 9,000 (2015)
- Language family: Austroasiatic: Bahnaric; West; Heun

Language codes
- ISO 639-3: nev
- Glottolog: nyah1249
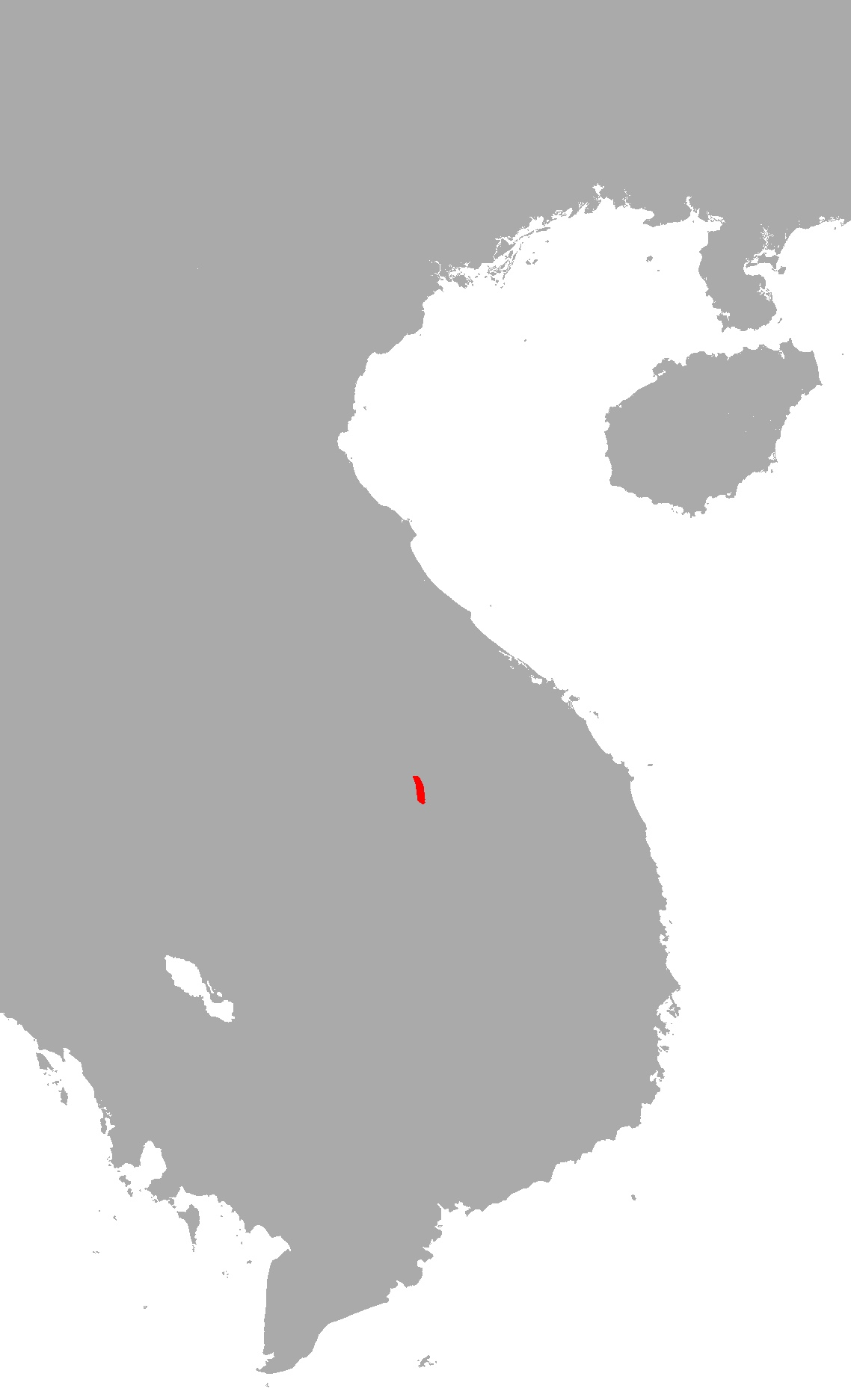

Nyaheun (autonym: Heun /hɐɐɲ/) is a Mon–Khmer language of the Bahnaric branch spoken in southern Laos. Chazée (1999:95) estimates the population at 4,200, while the 1995 Laotian census places the Nyaheun population at 5,152. According to Ethnologue, the language is "vigorous," which means it is spoken by people of all ages in its home community.

Nyaheun speakers were formerly distributed in the Senamnoy and Sepian valleys, but due to logging and hydroelectric power projects, they were forcibly relocated to Ban Tayeukseua (Tagneugsua; about 10 km southwest of Houeikong), and a new village 8 km north of Houeikong (near Ban Thongvay) (Sidwell 2003:21).

== Alternate names ==
Nyaheun is known by many alternate names including Nhaheun, Nhahem, Nya Hoen, Nia-Heun, Nyah Heuny, Gya Hon, Nahoen, Hoen, Honh, Hun, Hin, Iahoun, Nya Hön, Nyah Heuny, Nha Heun, Yaheun, and Nyahon.
