= Cua language (Austroasiatic) =

Mon–Khmer language of Vietnam

Cua
- Native to: Vietnam
- Native speakers: 12,000 (2007)
- Language family: Austroasiatic: Bahnaric; East Bahnaric; Cua
- Writing system: Latin

Official status
- Recognised minority language in: Vietnam

Language codes
- ISO 639-3: cua
- Glottolog: cuaa1241
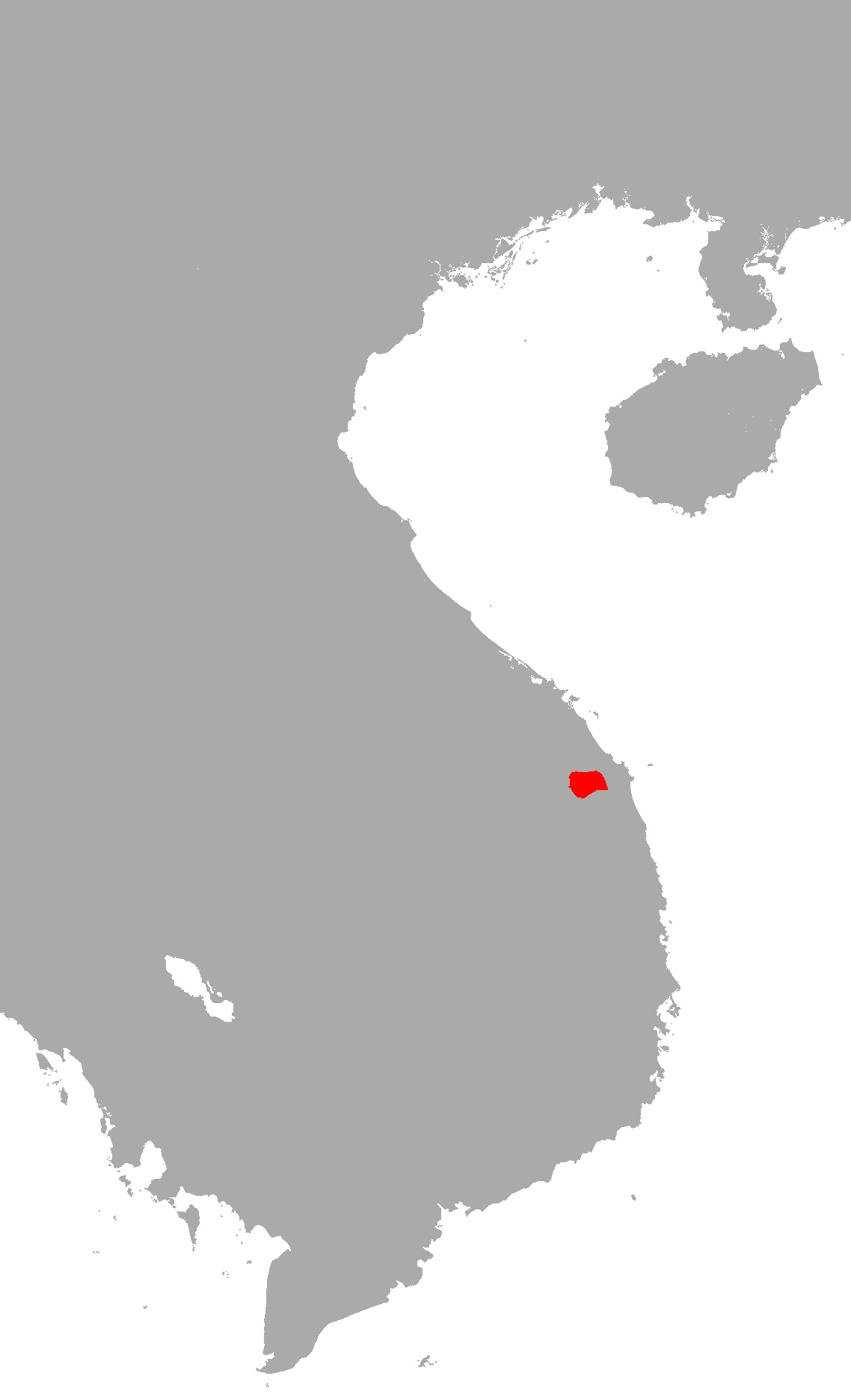

The Cua language (also known as Bòng Mieu) is a Bahnaric language spoken in the Quảng Ngãi and Quảng Nam provinces of Vietnam. Cua dialects include Kol (Kor, Cor, Co, Col, Dot, Yot) and Traw (Tràu, Dong). Maier & Burton (1981) is currently the most extensive Cua dictionary to date.

== Classification ==
Paul Sidwell (2009) considers Cua to constitute an independent primary branch of Bahnaric, which he calls East Bahnaric. Cua has also had extensive contact with North Bahnaric languages. However, Sidwell (2002) had previously classified Cua as a Central Bahnaric language.

== Phonology ==
The phonology of Cua, as cited by Sidwell (based on Maier 1969):

=== Consonants ===
		Bilabial	Alveolar	Palatal	Velar	Glottal
Plosive	aspirated	pʰ	tʰ		kʰ	
Plosive	voiceless	p	t	c	k	ʔ
Plosive	voiced	b	d	ɟ	ɡ	
Plosive	implosive	ɓ	ɗ			
Nasal		m	n	ɲ	ŋ	
Fricative			s			h
Approximant		w	l r ʰl	j		

=== Vowels ===
	Front		Central		Back	
	short	long	short	long	short	long
Close	i	iː	ɨ	ɨː	u	uː
Close-mid	e	eː			o	oː
Open-mid	ɛ	ɛː	ə	əː	ɔ	ɔː
Open			a	aː		
