= Katua language =

Austroasiatic language of Vietnam

Katua
- Kơtua
- Native to: Vietnam
- Native speakers: 4,000 (2007)
- Language family: Austroasiatic: Bahnaric; North Bahnaric; (?); Katua

Language codes
- ISO 639-3: kta
- Glottolog: katu1273
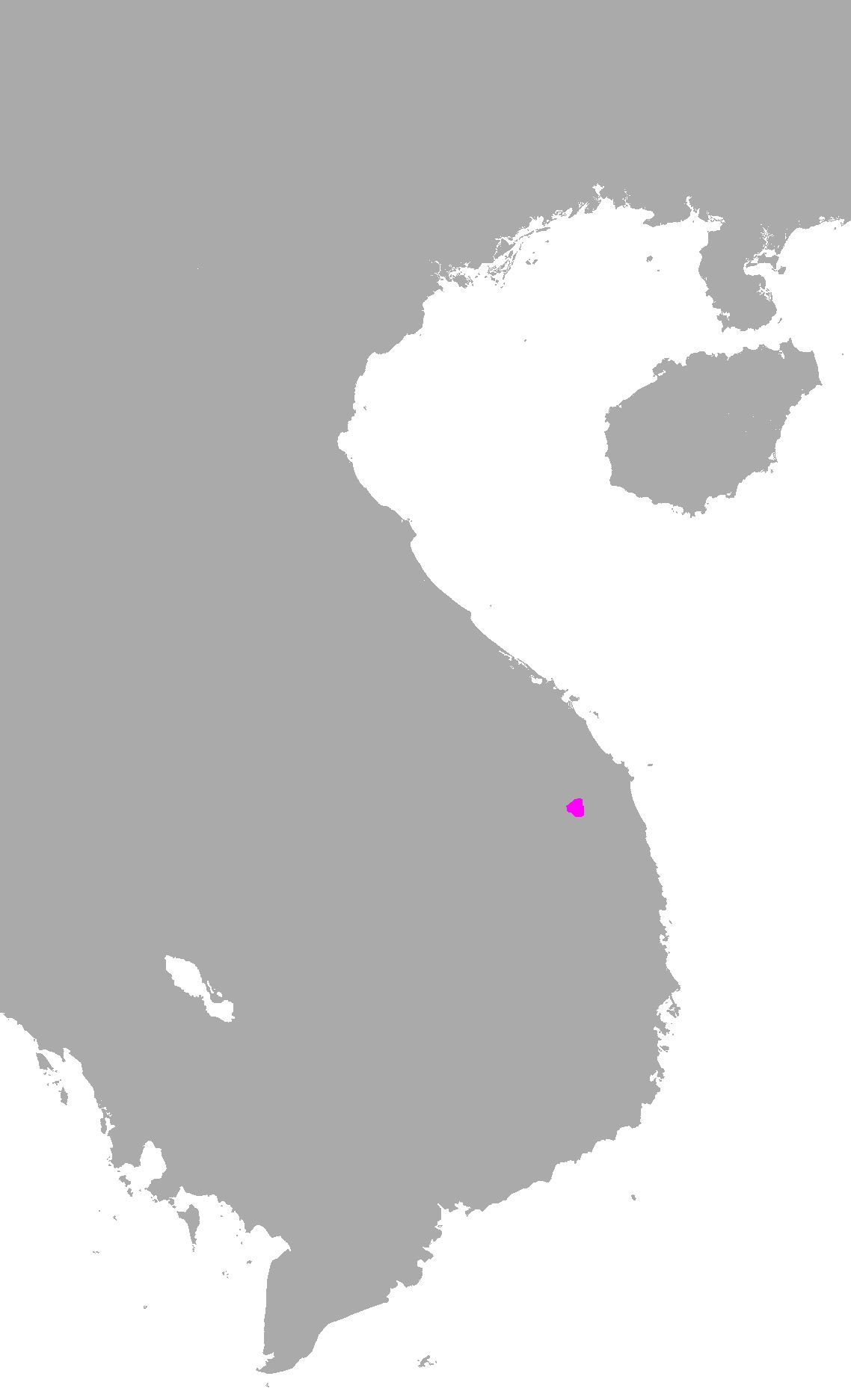

Katua (Ca Tua) is an Austroasiatic language of Vietnam.
