= Kacoʼ language =

Austroasiatic language spoken in Vietnam

Kachok
- Native to: Cambodia–Vietnam border
- Native speakers: 3,600 (2007)
- Language family: Austroasiatic: Bahnaric; North Bahnaric; Sedang–Todrah; Kachok
- Dialects: Kacoʼ; Romam

Language codes
- ISO 639-3: Either: xkk – Kachok rmx – Romam
- Glottolog: lama1291
- ELP: Kaco'
- Romam
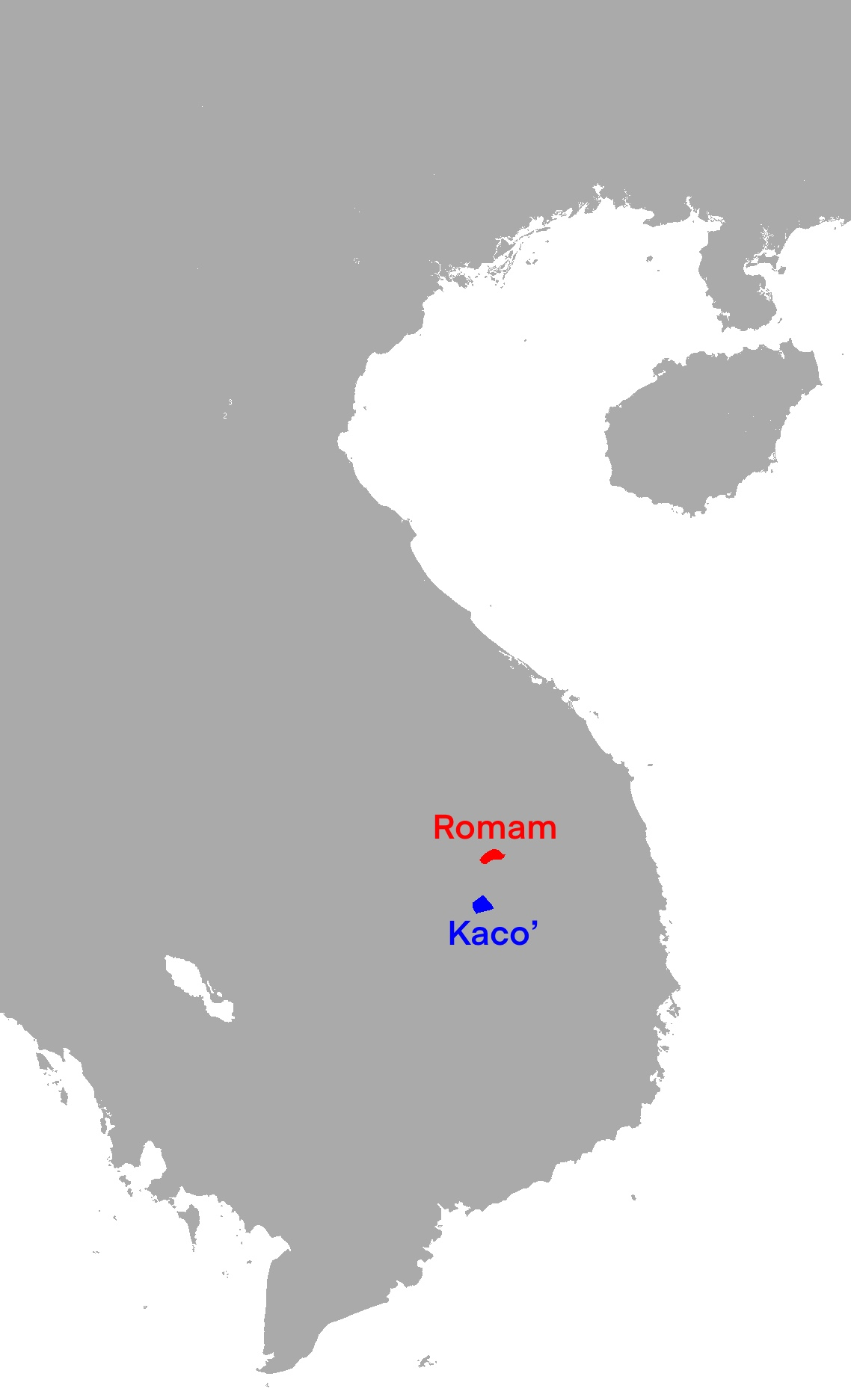

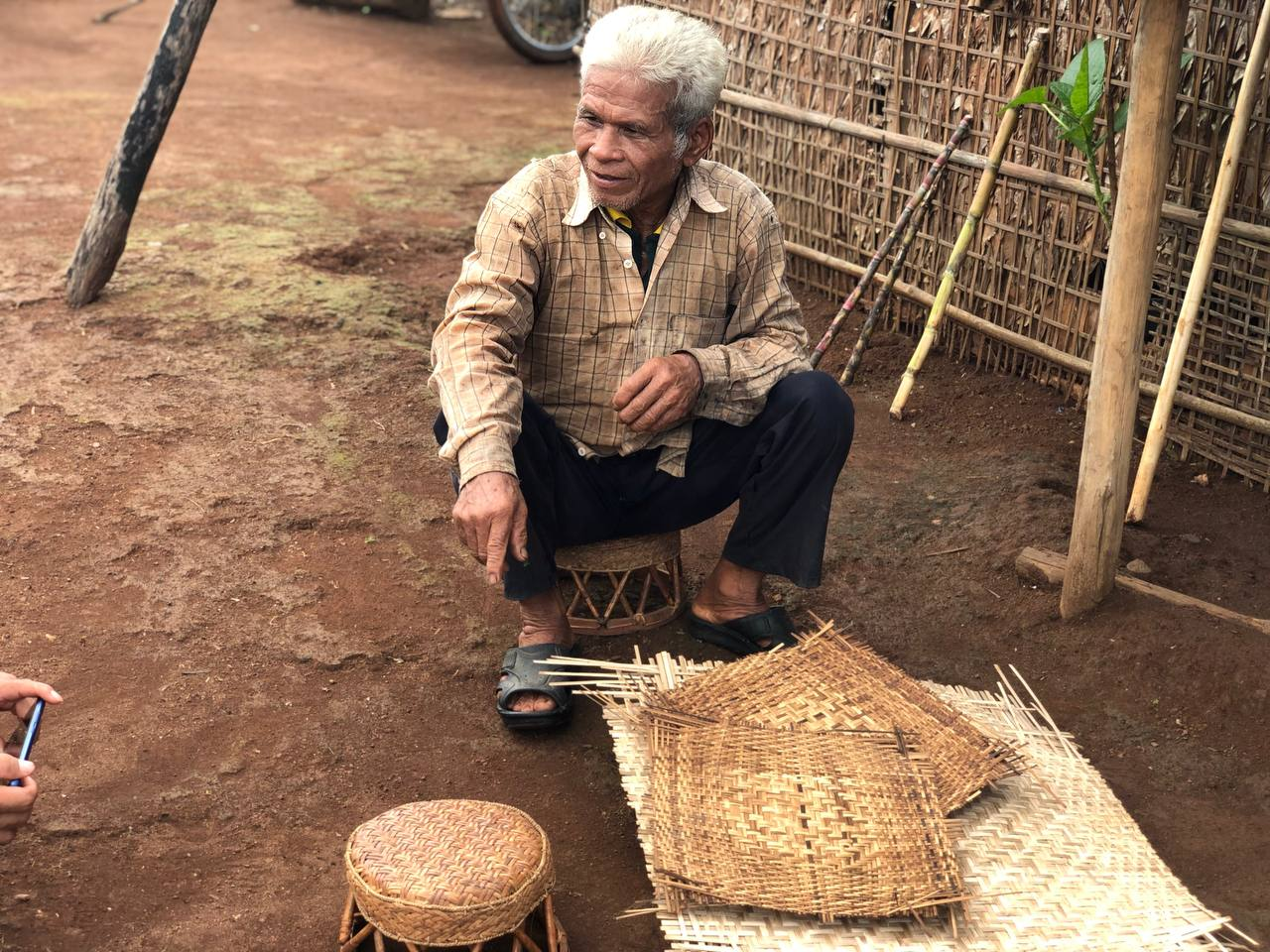
Kaco' ត្បាញចង្អេរ

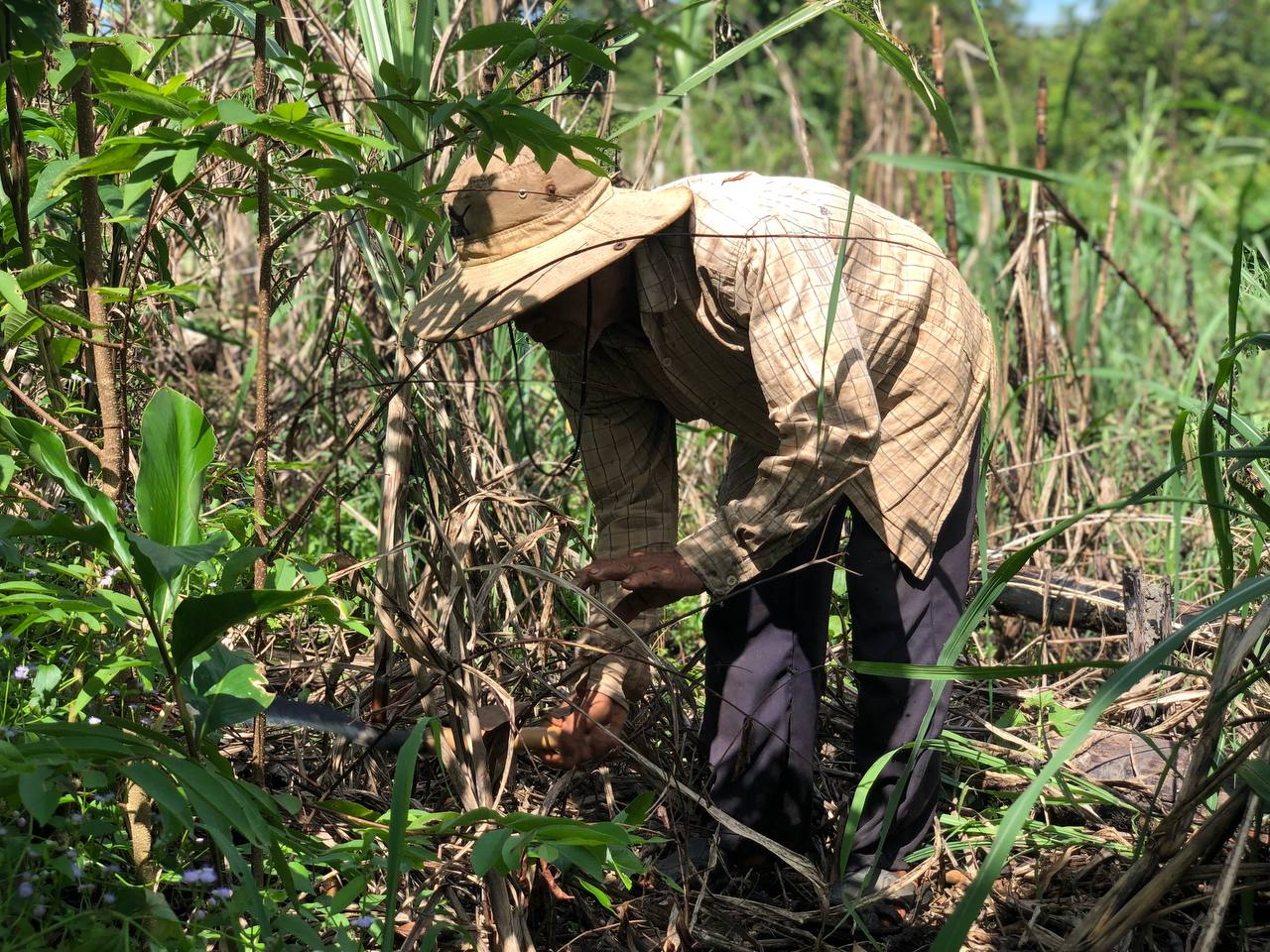
Grandpa clearing grass

Kacoʼ (Kachok) is an Austro-Asiatic language of Vietnam. The two dialects, Kacoʼ and Romam, are quite distinct. Lamam (Lmam) is a clan name found among the Kaco', not a distinct language.

In Vietnam, Romam (Rơ-măm) is spoken in Le village, Mo Rai commune, Sa Thầy District, Kon Tum province (Đặng, et al. 2010:115).
