= Jru' language =

Austroasiatic language spoken in Laos

Jru'
- Jruʔ, ຈຼ໌ຣູະ
- Native to: Laos
- Native speakers: 28,000 (2007)
- Language family: Austroasiatic: Bahnaric; West; Laven; Jru'
- Writing system: Lao script, Khom script

Language codes
- ISO 639-3: lbo
- Glottolog: lave1248

Jru' (IPA: [ɟruʔ]) is a Mon–Khmer language of the Bahnaric branch spoken in southern Laos. It is also known as "Loven", "Laven" or "Boloven" from the Laotian exonym Laven or Loven, which is derived from the Khmer name for the Boloven Plateau. The Jru' people engage in coffee and cardamom cultivation, as well as other agricultural activities.

== Classification ==
Jru' is a variety of Laven which belongs to the Western branch of the Bahnaric languages which also includes such languages as Brao.

== Geographical distribution ==
Jru' is the native language of the Jru' people, a hill tribe indigenous to the isolated mountains in Champasak, Sekong and Attapeu Provinces in the central part of extreme southern Laos. The variety described here is the most-studied variety that is spoken in Paksong District, Champasak in the towns of Paksong, Houeikong, Tateng, and various nearby villages.

== Phonology ==
The sounds and syllable structure of Jru' are typical of the West Bahnaric languages in general. Words are mostly monosyllabic although a few words have minor pre-syllables, retaining the classic Mon-Khmer sesquisyllabic structure. The register contrast seen in other Mon-Khmer languages has not been found in Jru' and, in contrast to the surrounding prestige language, Lao, Jru' has not developed phonemic tones.

=== Consonants ===
Similar to the other Mon-Khmer languages of the region, Jru' distinguishes five places of articulation in its consonant inventory and the stops can be either voiced, unvoiced or (unvoiced) aspirated. The consonants are given below in IPA as laid out by Jacq.

		Bilabial	Alveolar		Palatal	Velar	Glottal
Plosive	Aspirated	pʰ	tʰ			kʰ	
Plosive	Voiceless	p	t		c	k	ʔ
Plosive	Voiced	b	d		ɟ	ɡ	
Nasal		m	n		ɲ	ŋ	
Fricative			s				h
Approximant		w	l	r	j		

=== Vowels ===
The vowels of Jru' inherited from Proto-Mon-Khmer show three vowel heights and three tongue positions, or amount of "backness". An innovation in which Jru' developed a rounding contrast in the open-mid back vowels, results in ten vowel positions. All ten also show a length contrast, giving a total of 20 monophthongs. Unlike other languages in the Southeast Asian sprachbund, the length contrast is not between short and long, but between "regular" and "extra short".

	Front		Central		Back	
	extra short	regular	extra short	regular	extra short	regular
Close	i	iː	ɨ	ɨː	u	uː
Close-mid	e	eː			o	oː
Open-mid	ɛ	ɛː	ə	əː	ʌ, ɔ	ʌː, ɔː
Open			a	aː		

Jru' additionally has three diphthongs /ia/, /ɨə/, and /ua/. The diphthongs /ie/ and /uo/ are also found in certain environments as allophones of /i/ and /u/, respectively.

=== Syllable structure ===
The maximal monosyllable is represented as (C_{1})C_{2}(R)V(C_{3}) where C_{1} is any voiceless consonant, C_{2} is any consonant except one identical to C_{1} (or R if present), R is /r/ or /l/, V is any vowel or diphthong and C_{3} is any consonant except a voiced or aspirated stop. The components in parentheses are not present in all words.

The maximal sesquisyllabic word structure is represented C_{1}əC_{2}(R)V(C_{3}) where C_{1} is /p/, /k/ or /t/, C_{2} is /h/, /r/ or /l/, V is any vowel or diphthong and C_{3} is any consonant except a voiced or aspirated stop.

== Writing system ==
As is the situation with most of the Mon-Khmer languages, Jru' has no indigenous writing system. However, at different points in history, various existing scripts including Quốc ngữ and Lao have been used or modified to transcribe the sounds of the language for study. During the Ong Keo Rebellion of the early 1900s, in which the Mon-Khmer hill tribes of the region joined together to resist French and Lao rule, Ong Kommandam, a speaker of the closely related Alak language, invented a complicated script called Khom that was used for a time to write Jru'.

Recently, linguist Pascale Jacq, with the help of native speakers, has devised an orthography based on the Lao script in an attempt to provide Jru' speakers a standardized method with which to write their language. Jacq's orthography is currently being used to compile a Jru'-Lao-English-French dictionary.
