= Lavi language =

Mon–Khmer language spoken in Laos

Lavi
- Native to: Laos
- Ethnicity: 1,215 (2015 census)
- Native speakers: (500 cited 1999)
- Language family: Austroasiatic: Bahnaric; West; Lavi
- Writing system: Latin script

Language codes
- ISO 639-3: lvi
- Glottolog: lawi1235
- ELP: Swoeng

Lavi (Lawi; autonym: Swoeng or səlwəŋ) is a Mon–Khmer language of the Bahnaric branch spoken in Sekong Province, Laos. Chazée (1999:95) estimates the population at 500, while the 2015 Laotian census places the Lavi population at 1,215.

The Lavi language was discovered by Thai linguist Therapan L-Thongkum in the late 1990s. Within the West Bahnaric branch, it is the most divergent language (Sidwell 2003). Lavi speakers reside in the village Ban Lavi (also called Ban Fandeng), which is about 8 km south of the city of Sekong. Speakers can also be found in Laongam in Salavan province, Paksong in Champasak province, and Thateng in Sekong province.
