= Sapuan language =

Austroasiatic language spoken in Laos

Sapuan
- Səpuar
- Native to: Laos
- Native speakers: 480 (1999) to 1,000 (2003)
- Language family: Austroasiatic: Bahnaric; West; Oi–The; Sapuan

Language codes
- ISO 639-3: spu
- Glottolog: sapu1248
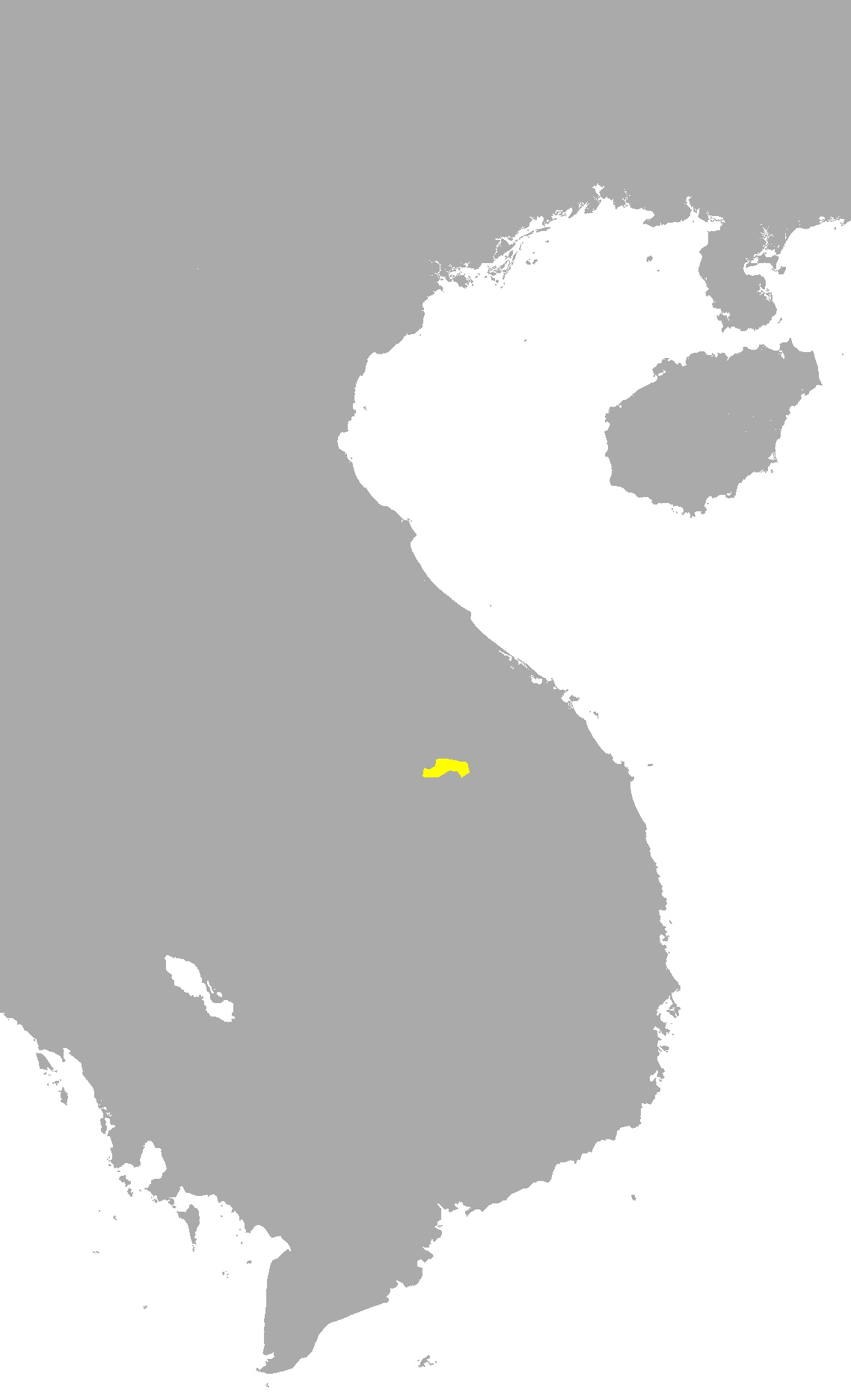

Sapuan (autonym: səpuar) is a Mon–Khmer language spoken in the single village of Ban Sapuan, located approximately 40 km north of Attapeu. Jacq and Sidwell (1999) provide a short grammar. Sidwell (2003) reports a population of just under 1,000. Chazée (1999:93) gives a lower estimate of 480.
