= Koho language =

Austroasiatic language spoken in Vietnam

Sre
- Kơho
- Native to: Vietnam
- Native speakers: 200,000 (2019 census)
- Language family: Austroasiatic: Bahnaric; South; Sre–Mnong; Sre
- Writing system: Latin script

Language codes
- ISO 639-3: Either: kpm – Kơho cma – Maa
- Glottolog: koho1243

Koho or K'Ho is a South Bahnaric language spoken by the Koho people and Mạ people, mainly in the Lâm Đồng Province of Vietnam. It is very close to the Mnong language.

The autonym of the Kơho people is kon cau (IPA: [kɔn.caw]) while Koho (IPA: [kəˈhɔ]) is a Cham exonym.

== Subgroups and dialects ==
There are at least twelve Kơho dialect groups for the area: Chil (Cil, Til); Kalop (Tulop); Kơyon (Kodu, Co-Don); Làc (Làt, Lach); Mà (Mạ, Maa); Nồp (Nop, Xre Nop, Noup); Pru; Ryông Tô (Riồng, Rion); Sop, Sre (Chau Sơre, Xrê); Talà (To La); and Tring (Trinh). Although Mạ/Maa is a Koho dialect group, the Mạ people identify as a separate ethnic group.

== Phonology ==
Data below are from Olsen (2015).

=== Consonants ===
==== Initial consonants ====
		Bilabial	Alveolar	Palatal	Velar	Glottal
Stop	Voiceless	p	t	c	k	ʔ
Stop	Aspirated	pʰ	tʰ	cʰ	kʰ	
Stop	Voiced	b	d	ɟ	g	
Stop	Implosive	ɓ	ɗ			
Nasal		m	n	ɲ	ŋ	
Fricative			s			h
Rhotic			r			
Approximant		w	l	j		

- The phoneme /r/ is commonly a voiced alveolar trill [r] but also often reduces to a flap [ɾ] when it occurs as the second segment in a consonant cluster.

==== Final consonants ====
	Bilabial	Alveolar	Palatal	Velar	Glottal
Stop	p	t	c	k	ʔ
Nasal	m	n	ɲ	ŋ	
Fricative		s			h
Rhotic		r			
Approximant	w	l	j		

- Before the palatal finals /c/ and /ɲ/, there is an audible palatal offglide after the vowel [Vʲ], so that /pwac/ ‘flesh’ is pronounced as [pwaʲc] and /ʔaɲ/ ‘I (1st person singular)’ as [ʔaʲɲ].

=== Vowels ===
	Front	Central	Back
High	/i/	/ɨ~ɯ/	/u/
Close-mid	/e/	/ǝ/	/o/
Open-mid	/ɛ/		/ɔ/
Low		/a/	/ɑ/

- Vowels contrast in length.

== Morphology ==
=== Compounding ===
Compounding is a common way of coining new words in Koho. Some examples:

- muh mat ‘face’ < muh ([muh]) ‘nose’ + mat ([mat]) ‘eye’
- phe mbar ‘sticky rice’ < phe ([phɛ]) ‘husked rice’ + mbar ([mbar]) ‘sticky’
- ôi ao ‘clothes’ < ôi ([ʔoːj]) ‘blanket’ + ao ([ʔaːw]) ‘shirt’

=== Affixing ===
One of the more productive prefixes in Sre is the causative tơn- [tən-], converts intransitive verbs to causative verbs. If the prefixed verbs have a nasal initial, then the nasal cluster avoidance rule applied.

Word	Meaning	Prefixed form	Meaning
duh [duh]	to be hot	tơnduh [tənduh]	to make hot
chơt [cʰət]	to die	tơnchơt [təncʰət]	to kill
ring [riŋ]	to be flat, level, equal	tơnring [tənriŋ]	to equalize, make right
mut [mut]	to enter	tơmut [təmut]	to make enter
muu [muː]	to descend, go down	tơmuu [təmuː]	to make descend, to lower

== Cultural references ==
- The Vietnamese acrobatic show Teh Dar by Lune Productions uses the Koho language.

== Sources ==
- Olsen, Neil H. (2014). A descriptive grammar of Kơho-Sre: a Mon-Khmer language (Ph.D. thesis). University of Utah.
