= Juk language =

Austroasiatic language spoken in Laos

Juk
- Native to: Laos
- Language family: Austroasiatic: Bahnaric; West; Laven; Juk
- Writing system: Lao script, Khom script

Language codes
- ISO 639-3: None (mis)
- Glottolog: None
- ELP: Juk

Juk (also known as Suai, Souei, Xuay) is a Mon–Khmer language of the Bahnaric branch spoken in Sekong Province, Laos. According to Sidwell (2003), it was probably a northern dialect of Jru' that had differentiated through separation by migration.

The Juk language was discovered by Thai linguist Therapan L-Thongkum. Juk speakers live in the village Ban Nyôkthông (Gnôkthông), located about 12 km north of Ban Kafe. It is located halfway between the towns of Tateng and Sekong.
