= Rengao language =

North Bahnaric language of Vietnam

Rengao
- Ro-Ngao
- Native to: Vietnam
- Native speakers: 18,000 (2007)
- Language family: Austroasiatic: Bahnaric; North; Bahnar-Sedang; Rengao
- Writing system: Latin

Language codes
- ISO 639-3: ren
- Glottolog: reng1252
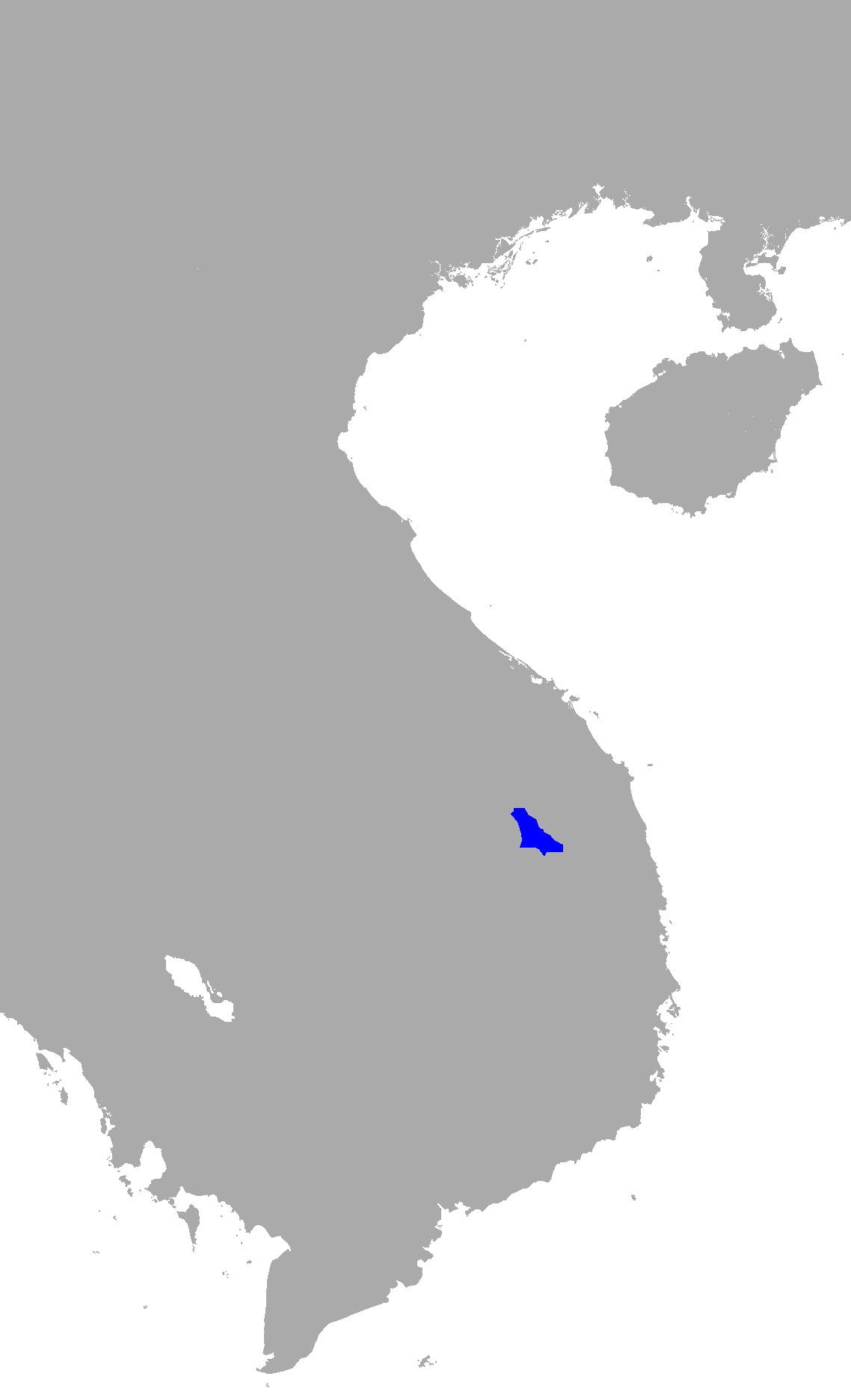

Rengao is a North Bahnaric language. It is spoken in Central Vietnam by the Rengao (Rơ Ngao) subgroup of the Bahnar people.

== Phonology ==
Consonant phonemes of Rengao
| | | Bilabial | Dental | Alveolar | Palato-alveolar | Retroflex | Palatal | Velar | Glottal |
|---|---|---|---|---|---|---|---|---|---|
| Nasal | | m | | n | | ɳ | | ŋ | |
| Plosive | voiceless | p | t̪ | | | ʈ | | k | |
| Plosive | voiced | b | d̪ | | | ɖ | | ɡ | |
| Affricate | voiceless | | | t͡s | t͡ʃ | | | | |
| Affricate | voiced | | | d͡z | d͡ʒ | | | | |
| Fricative | voiceless | | | s | ʃ | ʂ | | x | h |
| Fricative | voiced | | | z | ʒ | ʐ | | ɣ | |
| Rhotic | | | | r | | ɽ | | | |
| Approximant | | | | l | | | j | w | |

Vowel phonemes of Rengao
| | Front | Central | Back |
|---|---|---|---|
| Close | i | | u |
| Mid | e | ə | o |
| Open | a | | ɑ |
