= Takua language =

Austroasiatic language of Vietnam

Takua
- Native to: Vietnam
- Native speakers: 6,000 (2007)
- Language family: Austroasiatic: Bahnaric; North Bahnaric; Takua

Language codes
- ISO 639-3: tkz
- Glottolog: taku1254
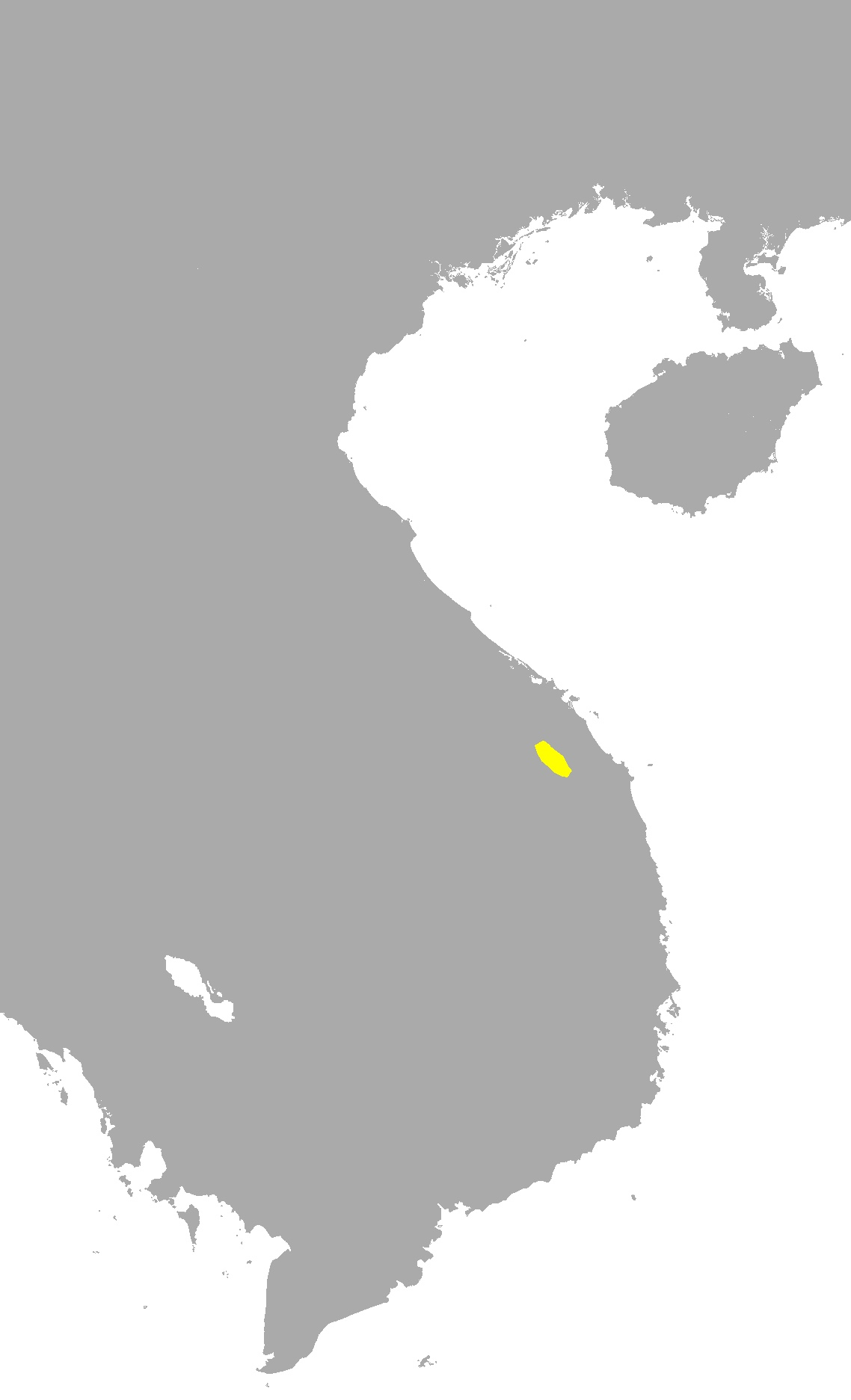

Takua is an Austroasiatic language of Vietnam spoken by the Takua people who live in the mountainous regions of Quảng Nam and Quảng Ngãi provinces.
