= Sedang language =

Austroasiatic language of Laos and Vietnam

Sedang
- Rơtéang, Rơteăng
- Native to: Vietnam and Laos
- Region: Kon Tum, Quảng Nam, Quảng Ngãi, Dak Lak(Vietnam)
- Ethnicity: Sedang people
- Native speakers: 98,000 (2007)
- Language family: Austroasiatic: Bahnaric; North Bahnaric; Sedang–Todrah; Sedang
- Writing system: Latin (modified Vietnamese alphabet)

Language codes
- ISO 639-3: sed
- Glottolog: seda1262
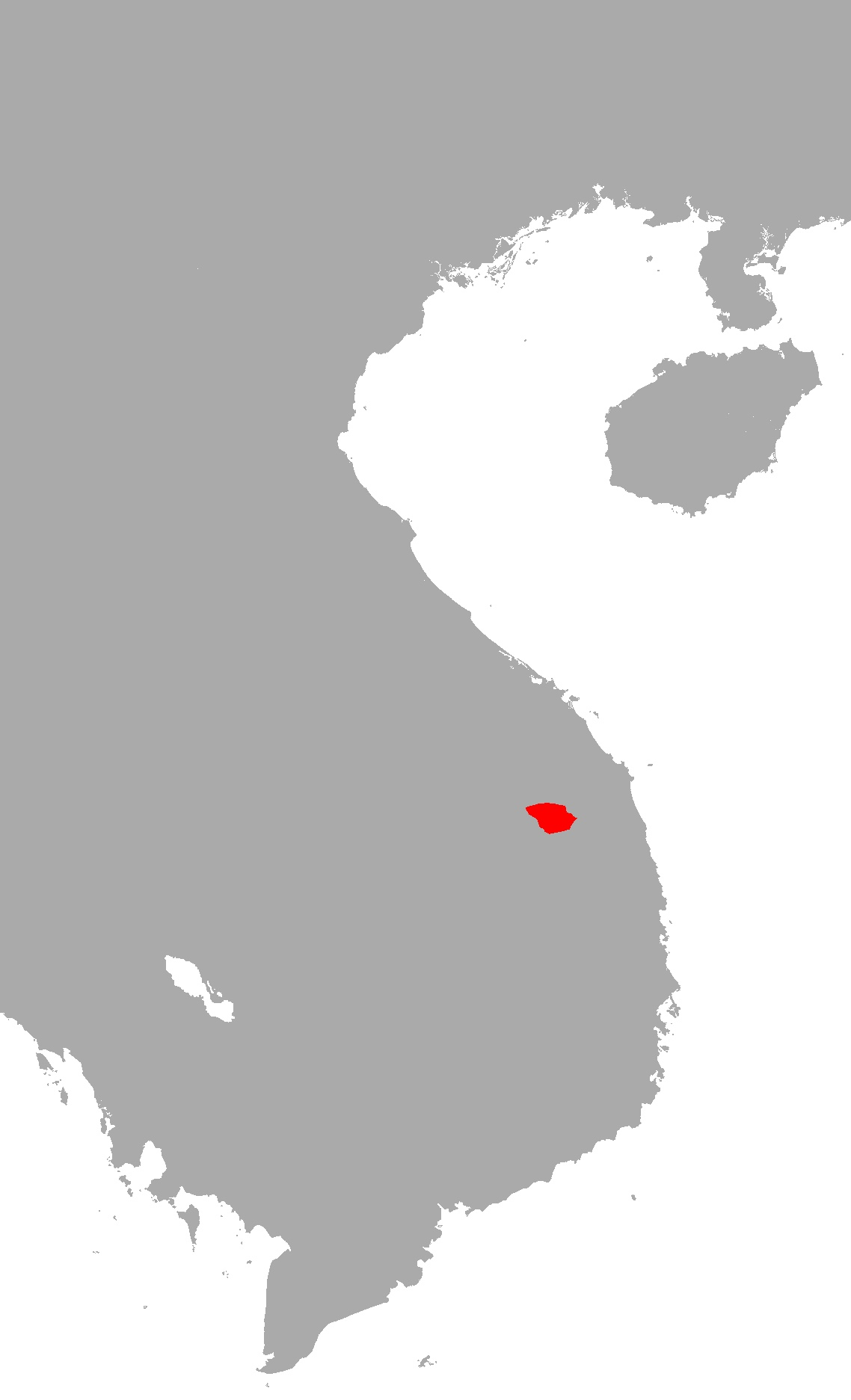

Sedang is an Austro-Asiatic language spoken in eastern Laos and Kon Tum Province in south central Vietnam. The Sedang language has the most speakers of any of the languages of the North Bahnaric language group, a group of languages known for their range of vowel phonations.

== Phonology ==
=== Consonants ===
		Labial	Alveolar	Palatal	Velar	Glottal
Nasal		m	n	ɲ	ŋ	
Plosive	unaspirated	p	t	tɕ	k	ʔ
Plosive	aspirated	pʰ	tʰ	tɕʰ	kʰ	
Plosive	prenasalized	ᵐb	ⁿd	ᶮdʑ	ᵑɡ	
Fricative	voiceless	f	s		x	h
Fricative	voiced	v	z		ɣ	
Approximant		w	l	j		

=== Vowels ===
Sedang itself has 24 pure vowels: 7 vowel qualities, all of which may be plain ([a]), nasalized ([ã]), and creaky ([a̰]) and three of which /i a o/ may be both nasal and creaky ([ã̰]). While it does not have the length distinctions of other North Bahnaric languages, it has more diphthongs, between 33 and 55 vowel sounds all together. (The above set yields 50.) Sedang is thus sometimes claimed to have the largest vowel inventory in the world. However, other Bahnaric languages have more vowel qualities (Bahnar, for example, has 9) in addition to phonemic vowel length so the language with the record depends closely on how the languages are described and distinct vowels are defined.

	Front	Central	Back
High	i		u
Upper Mid	e		o
Lower Mid	ɛ		ɔ
Low		a	

==== Diphthongs ====
	Front Glide	Central Glide	Back Glide
/i/ Nucleus	iɛ̯, ḭɛ̯	iə̯, ḭə̯, ĩə̯̃, ḭ̃ə̯̃	io̯, ĩõ̯
/u/ Nucleus		uə̯, ṵə̯, ũə̯̃, ṵ̃ə̯̃	uo̯, ṵo̯
/e/ Nucleus		eə̯, ḛə̯, ẽə̯̃, ḛ̃ə̯̃	eo̯, ḛo̯, ḛ̃o̯
/o/ Nucleus	oɛ̯, o̰ɛ̯	oə̯, o̰ə̯, õə̯̃	
