= Kayong language (Vietnam) =

Austroasiatic language spoken in Vietnam

Kayong
- Native to: Vietnam
- Native speakers: 25,000 (2007)
- Language family: Austroasiatic: Bahnaric; North Bahnaric; Kayong

Language codes
- ISO 639-3: kxy
- Glottolog: kayo1245
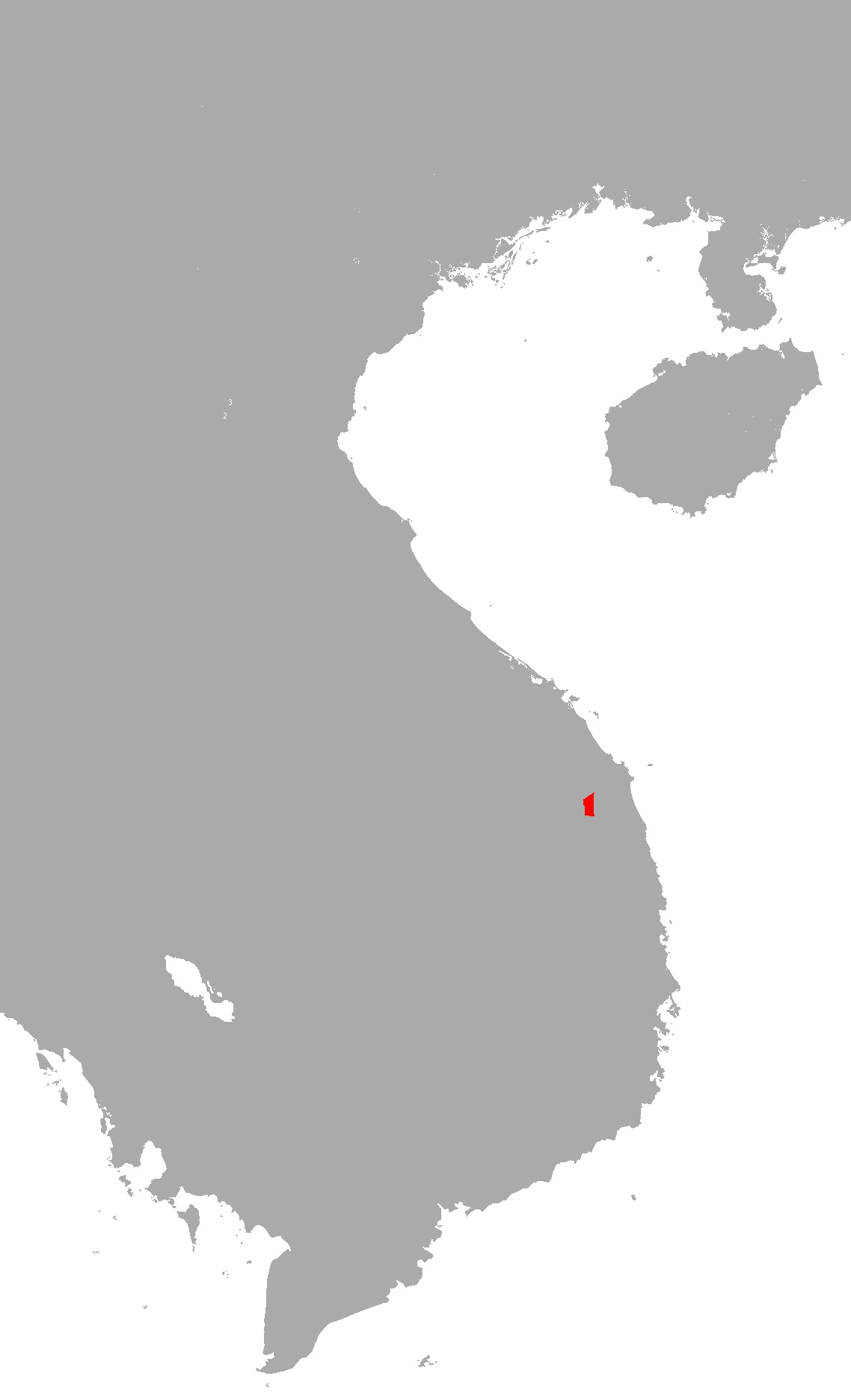

Kayong (Ca Giong) is an Austro-Asiatic language of Vietnam. Speakers are officially classified by the Vietnamese government as Sedang people.

Kayong (Ca-dong) is spoken in Sa Thầy District and Kon Plông District of Kon Tum Province (Lê et al. 2014:175)

== Bibliography ==
- Lê Bá Thảo, Hoàng Ma, et al.; Viện hàn lâm khoa học xã hội Việt Nam - Viện dân tộc học. 2014. Các dân tộc ít người ở Việt Nam: các tỉnh phía nam. Ha Noi: Nhà xuất bản khoa học xã hội. ISBN 978-604-90-2436-8
