= Oi language =

Austroasiatic language spoken in Laos

Oy
- The
- Native to: Laos
- Ethnicity: Oy, Jeng, Sok, Sapuan
- Native speakers: 24,000 (2015 census) plus 8,000 Sok, Sapuan and Jeng (1981–2007)
- Language family: Austroasiatic: Bahnaric; West; Oy

Language codes
- ISO 639-3: Either: oyb – Oy spu – Sapuan
- Glottolog: oyyy1238 Oy sapu1247 Sapuan–Sok jeng1241 Jeng
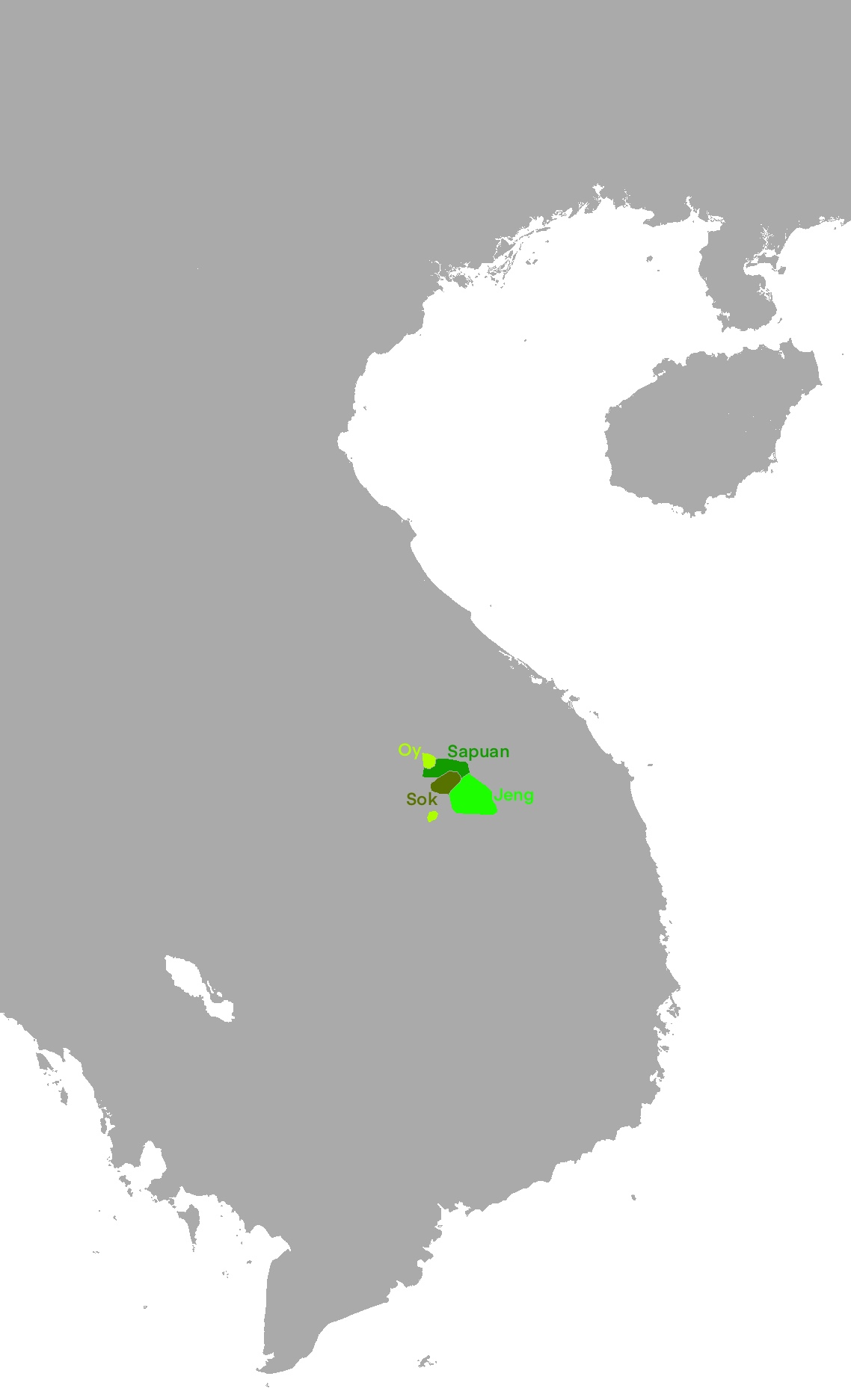

Oi (Oy, Oey; also known as The, Thang Ong, Sok) is an Austroasiatic dialect cluster of Attapeu Province, southern Laos. The dominant variety is Oy proper, with 11,000 speakers who are 80% monolinguals. The Jeng (Cheng) speak the same language but are ethnically distinct (Sidwell 2003). Speakers follow traditional religions.

== Distribution ==
Some locations where Oi is spoken in include (Sidwell 2003:26):

- Ban Sok, 40 km north of Attapeu
- Ban Lagnao, 10 km northwest of Attapeu
- Ban Inthi, 25 km southwest of Attapeu; speakers claim to have migrated from the Bolaven Plateau about 80 years ago, around the time of the Ong Kommandam Rebellion.
- Ban Mai, at the southern slope of the Bolaven Plateau
- Ban Champao, at the southern slope of the Bolaven Plateau
- Sepian forest, as far as the Khampo River

The Jeng live mostly along the banks of the Sekaman River, in and around Ban Fandeng (Phandɛŋ).

According to Daniell (2020), there are about 20 Oy villages in Attapeu Province, Laos. The following villages are ordered roughly from west to east, and are located along or near the Sekong River, in an area of Attapeu Province to the west of Attapeu Town.

- Thasengchan
- Thahintai
- Bok
- Moung
- Thaouan
- Thabok
- Donesoung
- Inthii
- Chomphoy
- Somsouk
- Khang
- Hom
- Tamoloey
- Khemsang
- Champao
- Lanyao (Lagnao)
- Kayeu
- Konghang
- Sok
- Sapuan
