= Laven language =

Mon–Khmer dialect cluster spoken in Laos

Laven
- Native to: Laos
- Native speakers: 30,000 (2007)
- Language family: Austroasiatic: Bahnaric; West; Laven

Language codes
- ISO 639-3: Either: lbo – Jru’ (Laven) (Yrou) sqq – Sou (Su’)
- Glottolog: love1237

Laven is a Mon–Khmer dialect cluster of southern Laos. Laven is the exonym given by the Laotian government, while the autonym of many of those speakers is Jru' [ɟruʔ]. Varieties are:

- Jru' (also spelled Jruq)
- Juk
- Su' (also spelled Suq)

Laven varieties are described in detail by Therapan L-Thongkum and Paul Sidwell (2003).
