= Halang language =

Austroasiatic language spoken in Vietnam and Laos

Halang
- Salang
- Region: Kon Tum Province (Vietnam), Attapu Province (Laos)
- Ethnicity: Halang people
- Native speakers: (14,000 in Vietnam cited 2000); 4,000 in Laos (1999)
- Language family: Austroasiatic: Bahnaric; North; Halang
- Writing system: Latin (Vietnamese)

Language codes
- ISO 639-3: hal
- Glottolog: hala1252
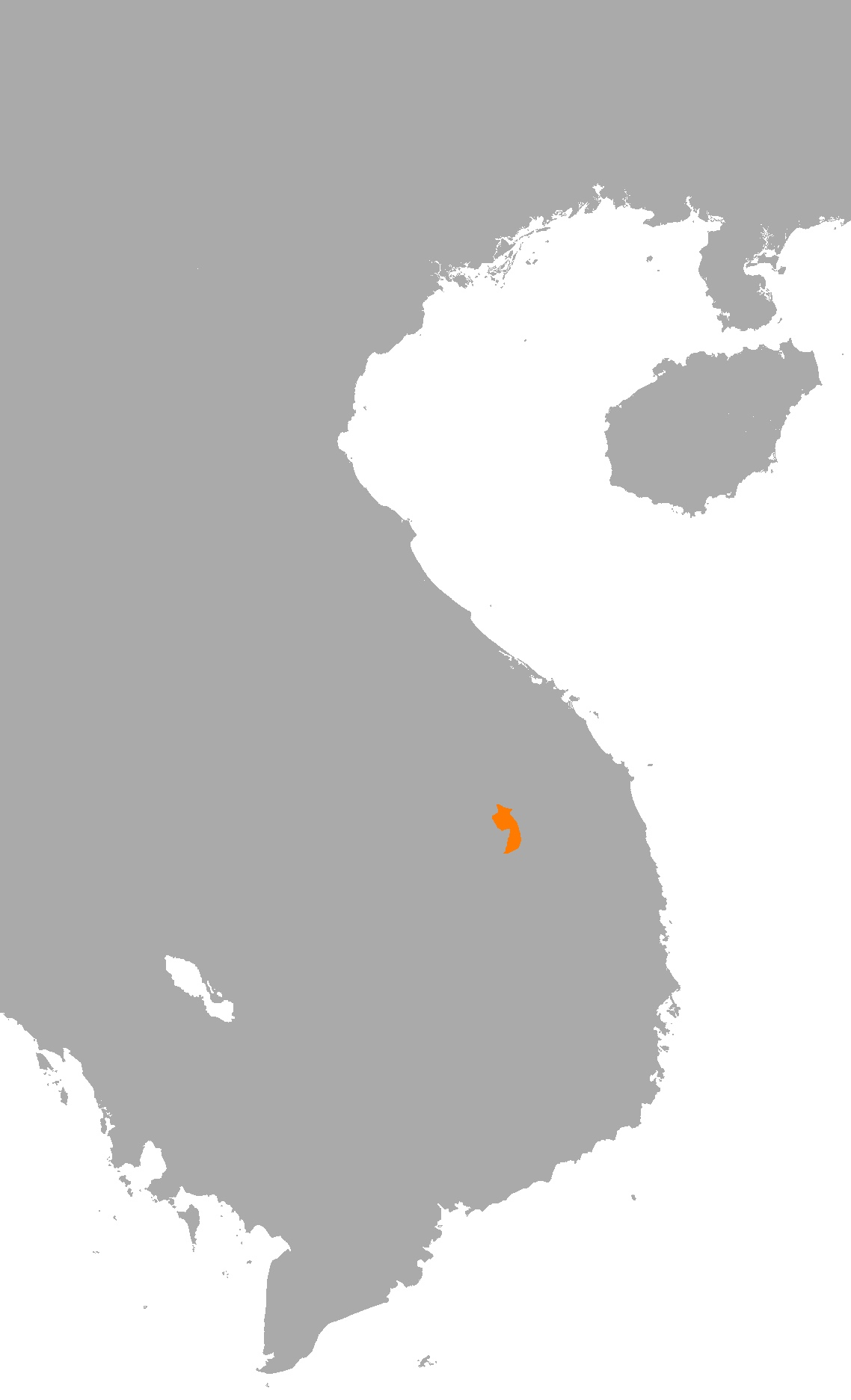

Halang, also known as Salang, is a Bahnaric language of the Mon–Khmer branch of the Austroasiatic language family. It is spoken in the southern Laotian province of Attapu by approximately 4,000 people and in the neighboring Kon Tum Province of Vietnam by approximately 13,000 people. In Vietnam, Halang is spoken in Đắk Na Commune, Đắk Tô District, Kon Tum Province (Lê et al. 2014:175)

In more specific usage, Halang refers to the dialect spoken in Vietnam, whereas Salang refers to the dialect spoken in Laos. Halang or Salang may also serve as an ethnonym for members of the ethnic group that speak the language. However, in Vietnam, the Halang speakers are officially classified as a subgroup of the larger Sedang ethnicity.
