= Hrê language =

Language of central Vietnam

Hrê
- Native to: Vietnam
- Ethnicity: H're people
- Native speakers: 94,000 (2007)
- Language family: Austroasiatic: Bahnaric; North; Sedang–Todrah; Hrê
- Writing system: Latin

Language codes
- ISO 639-3: hre
- Glottolog: hree1244
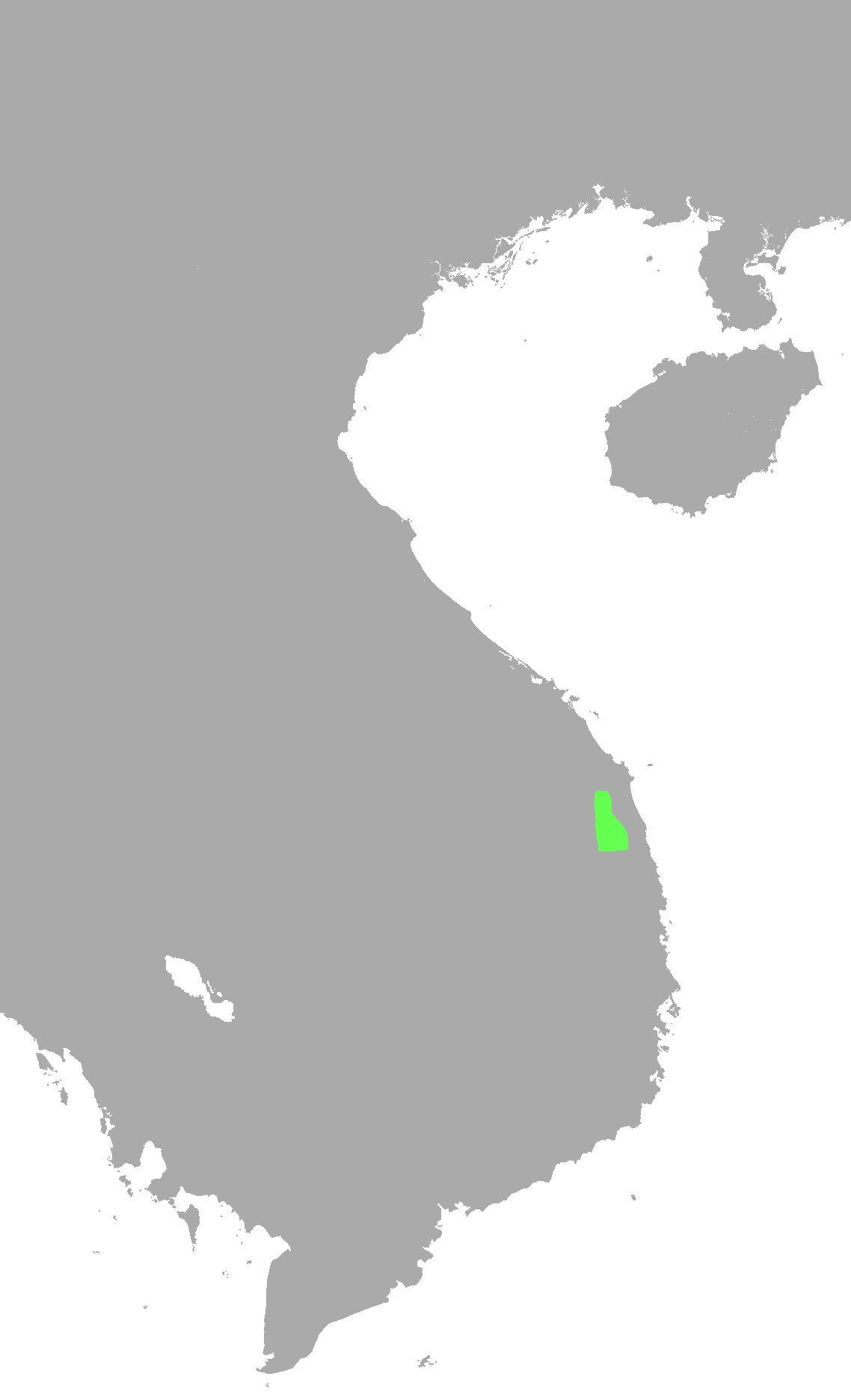

Hrê is a North Bahnaric language of central Vietnam. At the 2009 census, there were 127,000 ethnic Hrê.
