= Alak language =

Austroasiatic language spoken in Laos

Alak
- Native to: Laos
- Ethnicity: Alak people
- Native speakers: 4,000 (2007)
- Language family: Austroasiatic: Bahnaric; Central; Alak
- Writing system: Lao script, Khom script

Language codes
- ISO 639-3: alk
- Glottolog: alak1253

Alak is a language spoken by some 4,000 people in southern Laos, especially in the Provinces of Salavan and Sekong (where the Alak people make up over a fifth of the population). It is closely related to the language spoken by the Bahnars of Vietnam. It includes two dialects, Alak proper and Harak.
