= Stieng language =

Austroasiatic language spoken in Vietnam and Cambodia

Stieng
- Xtiêng, ស្ទៀង
- Native to: Vietnam, Cambodia
- Ethnicity: Stieng people
- Native speakers: 90,000 in Vietnam and Cambodia (2008 & 2009 censuses)
- Language family: Austroasiatic: Bahnaric; South Bahnaric; Stieng
- Writing system: Khmer, Latin

Language codes
- ISO 639-3: Either: sti – Bulo Stieng stt – Budeh Stieng
- Glottolog: stie1250
- ELP: Bulo Stieng
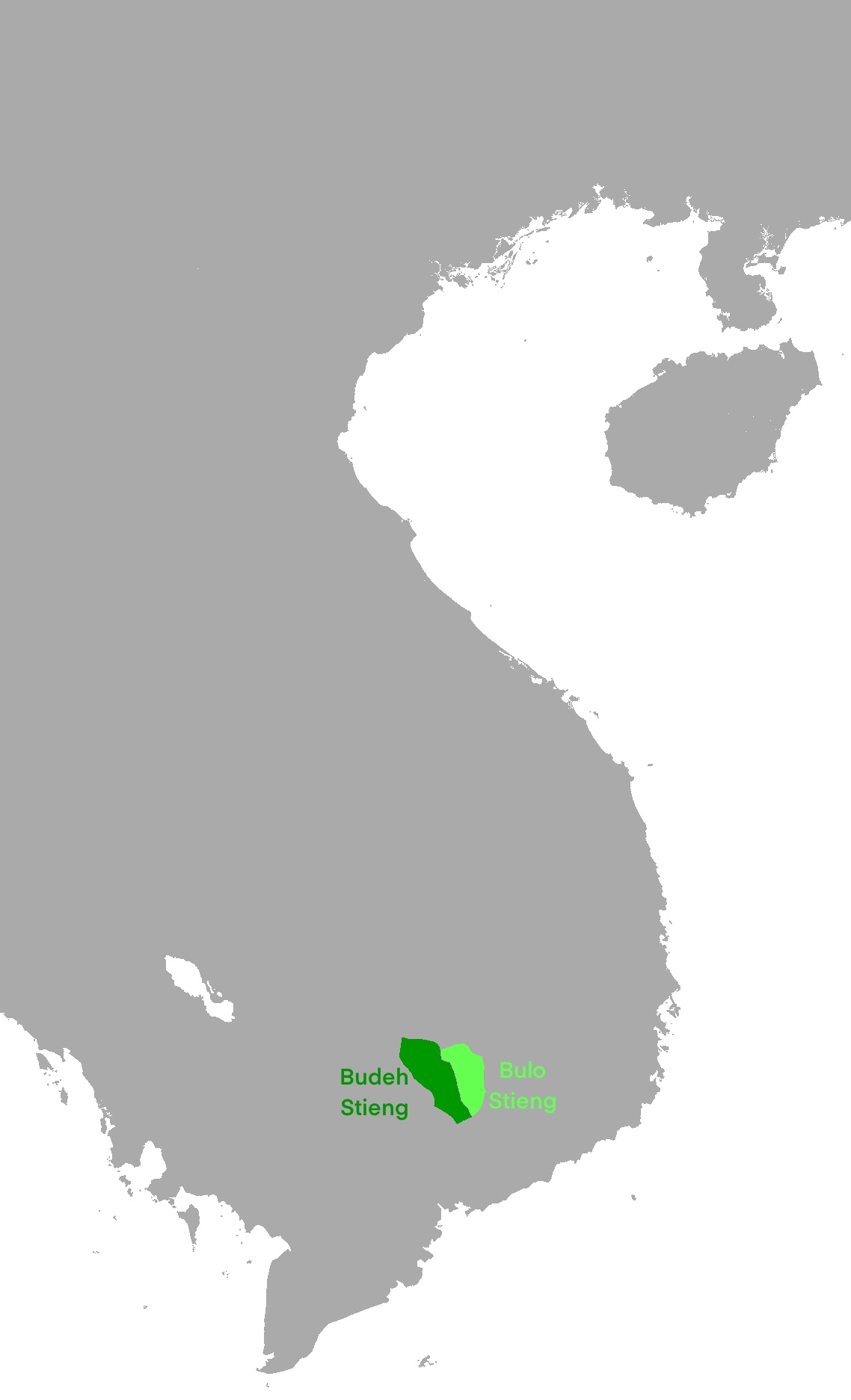

Stieng (IPA: [stiə̯ŋ], Vietnamese: Xtiêng, Khmer: ស្ទៀង) is the language of the Stieng people of southern Vietnam and adjacent areas of Cambodia. Along with Chrau and Mnong, Stieng is classified as a language of the South Bahnaric grouping of the Mon–Khmer languages within the Austroasiatic language family. In the Austroasiatic scheme, the Bahnaric languages are often cited as being most closely related to the Khmer language.

There are noted dialects of Stieng, some of which may not be mutually intelligible. However, due to the lack of widely available research, this article will primarily describe the dialect known as Bulo Stieng spoken in the provinces of Bình Phước, Lâm Đồng, Tây Ninh in southwestern Vietnam and Kratié (Snuol District) and Mondulkiri provinces in adjacent areas of eastern Cambodia. Bulo Stieng is spoken in more remote areas of the mountains and jungles alongside its close relative, Mnong. Other dialects, including Bu Dek and Bu Biek, are spoken in the lowlands and exhibit more influence from Vietnamese.

Unlike many other Mon–Khmer languages, Stieng does not distinguish voice quality, nor is it a tonal language like Vietnamese. Words may be either monosyllabic or sesquisyllabic.

== Phonology ==
=== Consonants ===
Haupers (1969) analyzes Stieng as having 25 consonant phonemes with three-way contrasts of voiced, unvoiced and pre-glottalized with aspiration described as a consonant cluster involving simple (i.e. not pre-glottalized) stops plus /h/. Analyses which include the aspirated series as independent phonemes yield 33 consonants and a five-way contrast.

		Bilabial	Dental	Alveolar	Palatal	Velar	Glottal
Plosive	Voiceless	p	t		c	k	ʔ
Plosive	Voiceless aspirated	pʰ	tʰ		cʰ	kʰ	
Plosive	Voiced	b	d		ɟ	ɡ	
Plosive	Voiced aspirated	bʱ	dʱ		ɟʱ	ɡʱ	
Plosive	Pre-glottalized	ʔb	ʔd				
Nasal	Voiced	m	n		ɲ	ŋ	
Nasal	Preglottalized	ʔm	ʔn				
Fricative	Voiceless		s		(ç)		h
Approximant	Voiced	w	l	r (ɾ)	j		
Approximant	Preglottalized		ʔl		ʔj		

Consonants appearing in syllable coda are devoiced and unreleased. For the alveolar approximate, the trilled [r] is found in free variation with the flapped [ɾ]. The voiceless palatal fricative [ç] appears only in syllable coda as a complementary allophone of [s].

=== Vowels ===
The Stieng vowel system consists of fifteen monophthongs and two diphthongs. In addition to vowel quality, quantitative length (duration) is also phonemic for vowels other than [ɛ] ([æ]) in closed syllables. The vowel [ɛ] ([æ]) is short before h and long elsewhere. This lack of minimal pairs for [ɛ] ([æ]) and [ɛː] ([æː]) suggests that [ɛ], [æ], [ɛː] and [æː] are all allophones.

	Front		Central		Back	
	short	long	short	long	short	long
Close	i	iə̯	ɨ	ɨː	u	uː uə̯
Close-mid	e (ɪ)	eː (ɪː)				oː
Open-mid	ɛ (æ)	ɛː (æː)		ʌː		ɔː
Open			a	aː	ɑ	

Symbols in parentheses represent allophonic variations.
