= Bahnaric languages =

Austroasiatic language group

Bahnaric
- Geographic distribution: Mainland Southeast Asia
- Linguistic classification: Austroasiatic: Bahnaric
- Proto-language: Proto-Bahnaric
- Subdivisions: Central Bahnaric; North Bahnaric; West Bahnaric

Language codes
- Glottolog: bahn1264
- Bahnaric

The Bahnaric languages are a group of about thirty Austroasiatic languages spoken by about 700,000 people in Vietnam, Cambodia, and Laos. Paul Sidwell notes that Austroasiatic/Mon–Khmer languages are lexically more similar to Bahnaric and Katuic languages the closer they are geographically, independently of which branch of the family they belong to, but that Bahnaric and Katuic do not have any shared innovations that would suggest that together they form a branch of the Austroasiatic family, rather forming separate branches.

== Internal diversity ==
Internal diversity suggests that the family broke up about 3,000 years ago. North Bahnaric is characterized by a register contrast between breathy and modal voice, which in Sedang has tensed to become modal–creaky voice.

Lamam is a clan name of the neighboring Tampuon and Kaco’.

Sidwell (2009) tentatively classifies the Bahnaric languages into four branches, with Cua (Kor) classified independently as East Bahnaric.

Unclassified Bahnaric languages of Cambodia include Mel, Khaonh, Ra’ong, and Thmon.

- Bahnaric
  - West Bahnaric
    - Jru' (Laven), Juk, Su'
    - Nyaheun
    - Oi, The, Sok, Sapuan, Cheng
    - Brao, Laveh, Krung, Kravet
  - Central Bahnaric
    - Taliang (Kasseng)
    - Alak
    - Central South
      - Tampuon
      - Bahnar
      - South Bahnaric
        - Chrau
        - Sre
        - Stieng
        - Mnong
  - North Bahnaric
    - Halang, Kayong
    - Jeh
    - Kotau
    - Tadrah, Modrah
    - Sedang
    - Hrê
    - Monom (Bonam)
    - Rengao
    - Kaco’, Ramam
  - East Bahnaric
    - Cua (Kor)

=== North Bahnaric ===
North Bahnaric consists of a dialect chain spoken to the north of the Chamic languages. Sedang and Hre have the most speakers, each with about 100,000.

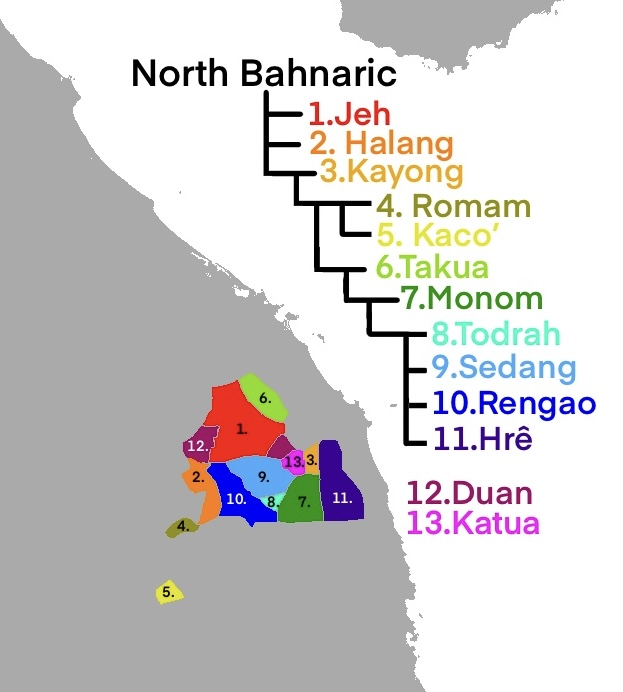
North Bahnaric languages

- North Bahnaric
  - Jeh
  - Halang
    - Kayong
      - Romam–Kaco’
        - Takua
          - Monom (Bonam, Monam)
            - Todrah (Didrah, Modrah)
              - Sedang
              - Rengao
              - Hrê

Other Northern Bahnaric languages, too poorly known to classify further, are Duan and Katua.

=== West Bahnaric ===
West Bahnaric is a dialect chain to the west of North Bahnaric, Unlike the other Bahnaric languages to the east, the West Bahnaric languages were under Khmer rather than Chamic influence, and also by the Katuic languages as part of a Katuic-West Bahnaric sprachbund (Sidwell 2003).

- West Bahnaric
  - Brao–Kavet: Lave (Brao), Kru'ng, Kravet
  - Laven, Sou [split?]
  - Nyaheun
  - Oi–The: Jeng; Oy, Sok, Sapuan, The

Sidwell (2003) proposes the following West Bahnaric groupings, with Lavi branching off first, Jru'/Laven, Su', and Juk as forming a branch that had branched off secondarily, and the rest within a core group. Jru' and Brao each have tens of thousands of speakers, while the other languages have no more than 1,000 speakers each.

- West Bahnaric
  - Lavi
    - Jru'/Laven, Su', Juk
      - Nyaheun
      - Sapuan
      - Oi/Sok/Cheng
      - Laveh/Brao

=== Central Bahnaric ===
Central Bahnaric is a language family divided by the Chamic languages, Bahnar, Mnong, and Sre (Koho) each have over 100,000 speakers.

- Central Bahnaric
  - Alak
  - Cua
  - Taliang (Kassang)
  - Central South: to the southwest of Chamic:
    - Tampuon
    - Bahnar
    - South Bahnaric
      - Stieng–Chrau: Chrau, Stieng (Bulo, Budeh)
      - Sre–Mnong: Koho, Mnong

Kassang is a Bahnaric language (Sidwell 2003), though Ethnologue lists it as Katuic.

Sidwell (2002, quoted in Sidwell 2003) gives the following classification for the Central Bahnaric languages. Note that Sidwell (2009) later classifies Cua as an independent branch, namely East Bahnaric.

- Central Bahnaric
  - North Central
    - Alak (Halak)
  - West Central
    - Kasseng/Taliang
    - Yaeh
  - East Central
    - Cua
  - South Central
    - Tampuon
    - Bahnar
      - South Bahnaric
        - Chrau
        - Koho
        - Ma'
        - Stieng
        - Mnong

=== Language diagrams ===
==== North Bahnaric (2022) ====
- North Bahnaric
    - Sedang
      - Halang
      - Sedang
      - Todrah
      - Monom
      - Kayong
    - Hre
    - Bahnar-Rengao
      - Bahnar
      - Rengao
    - Jeh
    - Trieng
  - Romam
  - Katua

== Lexical innovations ==
Paul Sidwell (2015:183) lists the following Bahnaric lexical innovations that had replaced original Proto-Austroasiatic forms.

Gloss	Proto-Bahnaric	Proto-Austroasiatic
bone	*kʦɨːŋ	*cʔaːŋ
fire	*ʔuɲ	*ʔus
tongue	*lpiət	*lntaːk
