= Brao language =

Austroasiatic language spoken in Cambodia and Laos

Brao
- Native to: Cambodia, Laos, Vietnam
- Ethnicity: Brao，Brau
- Native speakers: 62,000 (2009–2015)
- Language family: Austroasiatic: Bahnaric; West; Brao
- Writing system: Latin, Khmer

Language codes
- ISO 639-3: Variously: brb – Brao (was Lave) krr – Krung krv – Kavet
- Glottolog: lave1249
- ELP: Lave
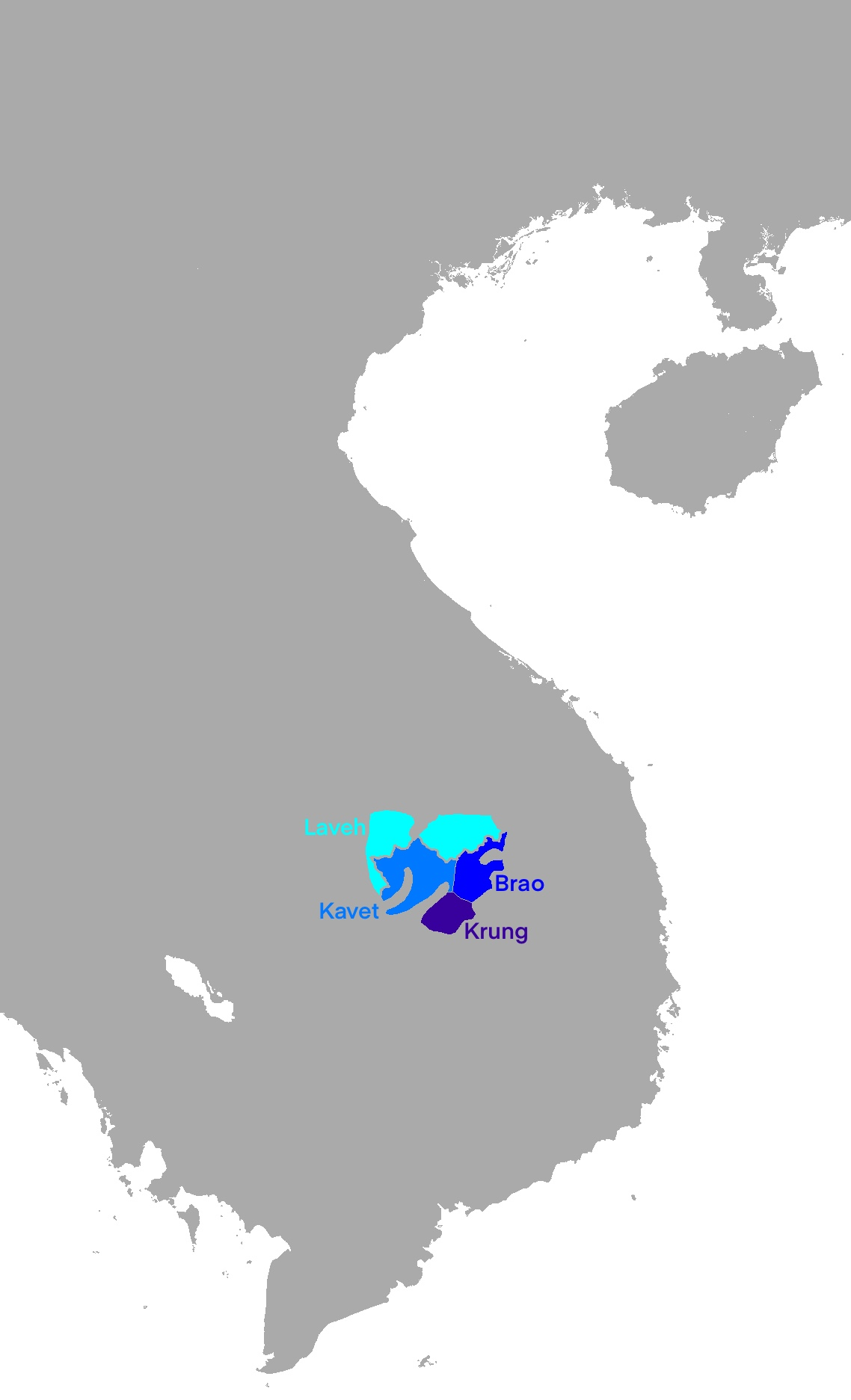

Brao is a Mon–Khmer language of Cambodia, Laos and Vietnam.

== Varieties ==
According to Ethnologue, there are four distinct but mutually intelligible varieties, sometimes considered separate languages: Lave (Brao proper), Kru’ng (Kreung), and Kavet (Kravet), the latter spoken by only a couple thousand.

Sidwell (2003) also lists four communities of speakers, three of which are in Cambodia.

- Laveh (Lave, Rawe): spoken in Attapeu Province, Laos south of the capital city of Attapeu. Laveh is the official designation given by the Laotian government.
- Krung (Krüng, "Krung 2"): spoken around Ban Lung in Ratanakiri Province, Cambodia
- Kavet (Kravet): spoken in Voeun Sai District, Ratanakiri Province, Cambodia
- Brao (Brou, Palaw, Preou): spoken in and around the town of Taveng in Ratanakiri Province, Cambodia

Lun, spoken in Stung Treng Province, Cambodia, is related to Lave and Kavet (Philip Lambrecht 2012).

== Demographics ==
Sidwell (2003) suggests the possibility of a total of 50,000 speakers, while Bradley (1994:161) gives an estimate of 35,000. All estimates below are drawn from Sidwell (2003:30).

- Laos: The 1995 Laotian census places the Laveh population at 17,544.
- Cambodia: The Asian Development Bank gave an estimate of 29,500 speakers as of the early 2000s.
- Vietnam: About 300 Brau live in Đắc Mế village, Bờ Y commune, Ngọc Hồi district, Kon Tum province (Đặng, et al. 2010:112). Parkin (1991:81) also estimates several hundred Brao in Vietnam.
- Thailand: Parkin (1991:81) estimates a Brao population of 2,500 in Thailand.

== Phonology ==
Consonants
		Labial	Denti-alveolar	Palatal	Velar	Glottal
Obstruent	voiceless	p	t	c	k	ʔ
Obstruent	aspirated	pʰ	tʰ	cʰ	kʰ	h
Obstruent	voiced	b	d	ɟ	g	
Obstruent	glottalized	ˀb	ˀd	ˀɟ	ˀg	
Nasal	plain	m	n	ɲ	ŋ	
Nasal	preaspirated	ʰm	ʰn		ʰŋ	
Trill			r			
Approximant		w	l	j		
