= Bahnar language =

Austroasiatic language spoken in Vietnam

Bahnar
- Bana, Ba-Na
- A road sign in Bahnar, located in Kon Tum, Quảng Ngãi province.
- Pronunciation: [ˈbəˌnaː]
- Native to: Vietnam
- Ethnicity: Bahnar people
- Native speakers: (160,000 in Viet Nam cited 1999 census)
- Language family: Austroasiatic: Bahnaric; North; Bahnar
- Writing system: Latin (adapted Vietnamese alphabet)

Language codes
- ISO 639-3: bdq
- Glottolog: bahn1262

The Bahnar language or Ba-Na language (Bahnar pronunciation: [ˈbəˌnaː]) is a Central Bahnaric language. It has nine vowel qualities and phonemic vowel length.

== Subdivisions ==
Đào (1998) lists the following subgroups of Bahnar and their respective locations.

- Bahnar Kon Tum: Kon Tum area
- Bahnar Jơlong: northeastern Kon Tum Province
- Bahnar Golar: northern Pleiku (Gia Lai Province)
- Bahnar Tosung: Mang Yang District (Gia Lai Province)
- Bahnar Konkođe: An Khê District (Gia Lai Province)
- Bahnar Alatang: An Khê District (Gia Lai Province)
- Bahnar Alakông: K'Bang District (Gia Lai Province)
- Bahnar Tolo: Kông Chro District and southern An Khê District (Gia Lai Province)
- Bahnar Bơnâm: eastern An Khê District (Gia Lai Province)
- Bahnar Roh: scattered areas in An Khê District and K'Bang District (Gia Lai Province)
- Bahnar Krem: Vĩnh Thạnh District and An Lão District (Bình Định Province)
- Bahnar Chăm: Vân Canh District (Bình Định Province)
- Bahnar But: forest areas; little communication with outsiders

Bùi (2011:5-6) lists the following subgroups of Bahnar and their respective locations.

- Tơ Lô: in Sơ Ró, Đắc Song, Chơ Loong, Yang Nam, and Đắc Tơ communes, which are in Kông Chro District and part of An Khê District (Gia Lai Province)
- Krem: in Vĩnh Thạnh District, as well as some in An Lão District, Hoài Ân District, and Tây Sơn District in Bình Định Province; some in Sơn Lang Commune, K'Bang District, Gia Lai Province
- Vân Canh: mostly in Canh Liên, Canh Thuận, and Canh Hòa communes of Vân Canh District, Bình Định Province
- Thồ Lồ: mostly in the upper part of Đồng Xuân District, Phú Yên Province. Scattered in 9 communes throughout Đồng Xuân District, Sơn Hòa District, and Sông Hinh District. Descended from Tơ Lô people who were Tây Sơn soldiers fleeing from the Nguyễn dynasty 200 years ago. They fled southeast to Thồ Lồ, Phú Yên Province. The
- Gơ Lar: mostly in Mang Yang District, Đắk Đoa District, and Chư Sê District of Gia Lai Province, and some living around Kon Tum town. There is also a subgroup called Bahnar Châng H'drung who live at the foot of Hàm Rồng Mountain.
- Kon Tum: in 4 precincts and 9 communes of Kon Tum town
- Jơ Lơng: in Kon Tum town, and Đắc Tơ Re, Đắc Ruồng, and Đắc Pne communes of Kon Rẫy District, Kon Tum Province
- Rơ Ngao (Rengao): in 29 villages. They live with the Kon Tum people in 5 communes of Kon Tum; with the Bahnar and Sedang peoples in 2 communes of Đắk Hà District; and with the Sedang people in Pô Cô Commune, Đắk Tô District, Kon Tum Province

== Phonology ==
=== Consonants ===
		Labial	Alveolar	Palatal	Velar	Glottal
Plosive	voiceless	p	t	tɕ	k	ʔ
Plosive	voiced	b	d	dʑ	ɡ	
Plosive	preglottal	ʔb	ʔd	ʔdʑ		
Nasal	plain	m	n	ɲ	ŋ	
Nasal	preglottal	ʔm	ʔn	ʔɲ	ʔŋ	
Fricative			s			h
Rhotic			r			
Approximant	plain	w	l	j		
Approximant	preglottal	ʔw	ʔl	ʔj		

Final consonants
	Labial	Alveolar	Palatal	Velar	Glottal
Plosive	p	t	tɕ	k	ʔ
Nasal	m	n	ɲ	ŋ	
Aspirate			jh^{1}		h
Rhotic		r			
Approximant	w	l	j		jˀ

Notes:

1. In the final sequence /jh/, /h/ is not pronounced and /j/ is pronounced phonetically as a short vowel /i/.

=== Vowels ===
	Front	Central	Back
Close	i iː	ɨː	u uː
Mid	eː	ə əː	oː
Open	ɛ ɛː	a aː	ɔ ɔː

== Also used in Vietnam ==
Other minor groups include the Kon Kđe, Bơ Nơm, and A Roh subgroups in Kông Chro District and K'Bang District of Gia Lai Province (Bùi 2011:6).

Ethnologue lists the following dialects of Bahnar.

- Tolo
- Golar
- Alakong (A-La Cong)
- Jolong (Gio-Lang, Y-Lang)
- Bahnar Bonom (Bomam)
- Kontum
- Krem
