= Kon Tum (city) =

Former provincial city and capital of the former Kon Tum province, Vietnam

- Provincial city
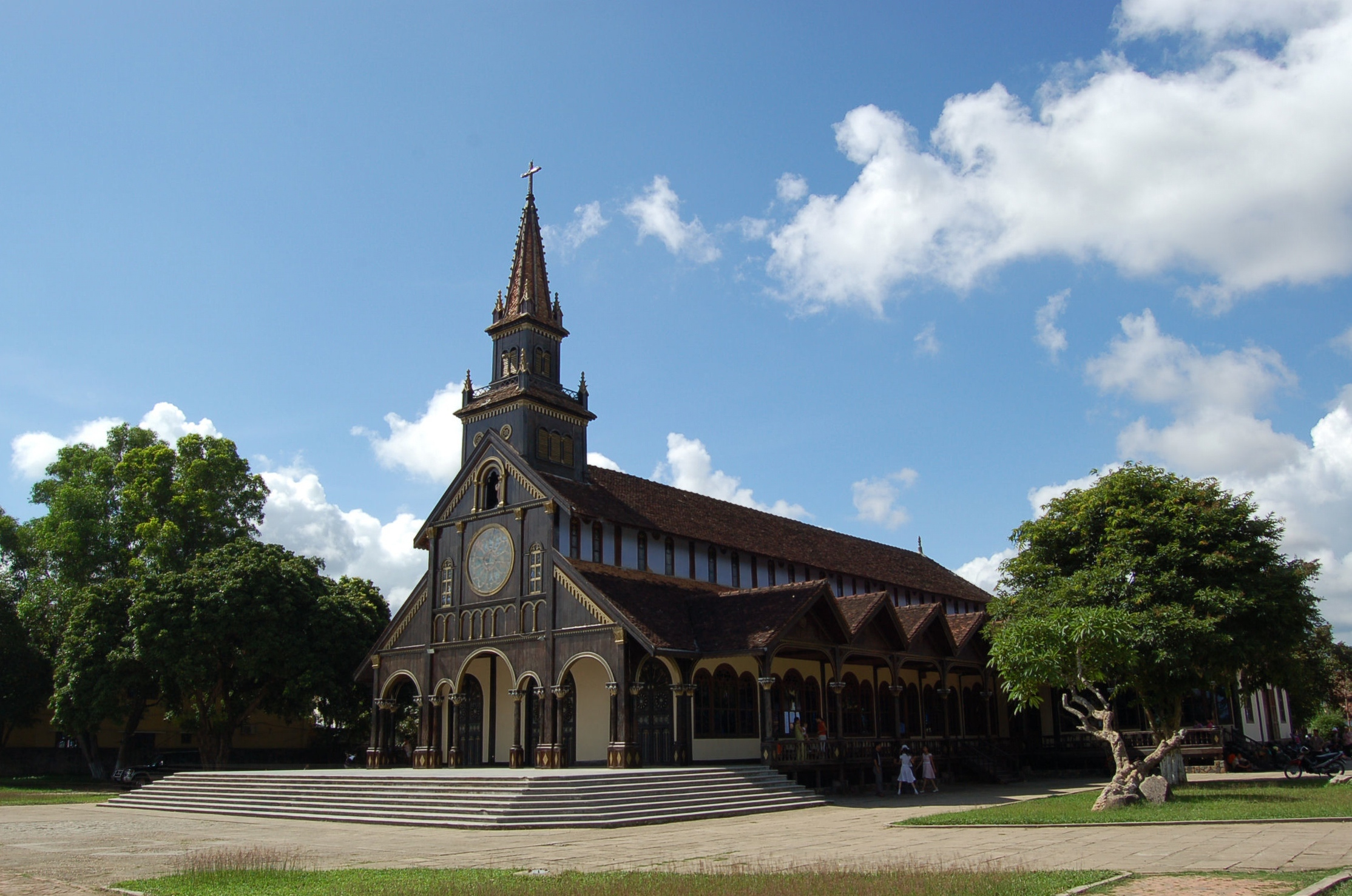
- Kon Tum Cathedral
- Interactive map of Kon Tum
- Coordinates: 14°20′50″N 108°00′00″E
- Country: Vietnam
- Region: Central Highlands
- Province: Kon Tum
- Dissolution: July 1, 2025

Government
  - Type: Provincial city

Area
  - Total: 433 km^{2} (167 sq mi)

Population (2020)
  - Total: 205,762 people
  - Density: 475/km^{2} (1,230/sq mi)
- Time zone: UTC+07:00

Kon Tum is a city in Vietnam that was the provincial city and capital of the former Kon Tum province, which was merged with Đắk Cấm, Đắk Bla, Đắk Rơ Wa, Ngọk Bay, and Ia Chim, into communes of Quảng Ngãi province.

== History ==
The area has historically been inhabited by the indigenous Bahnar people, hence the name Kon Tum, which means "Lake Village" in the Bahnar language. Due to its unique location, flat and fertile land enriched by the Đăk Bla River, and also due to many historical factors, this area gradually became a settlement for many different ethnic groups, including Viet people from Quảng Ngãi, Bình Định (today part of Gia Lai) and Quảng Nam (today part of Da Nang city). During the years 1841–1850, the French, on their missionary journey to the highlands, established the first Christian base here. In 1893, the French colonial government established the Kon Tum arrondissement, headed by father Vialleton, and from then on, the name Kon Tum was officially used. The provincial-level administrative unit established shortly afterwards also bore this name. Kon Tum will function as a provincial city until 2025, when it will be dissolved and divided into new wards and communes belonging to Quảng Ngãi province. One of these wards will inherit the name Kon Tum.

== Administrative divisions ==
Kon Tum city is divided into 21 administrative units, including 10 wards: Duy Tân, Lê Lợi, Ngô Mây, Nguyễn Trãi, Quang Trung, Quyết Thắng, Thắng Lợi, Thống Nhất, Trần Hưng Đạo, Trường Chinh and 11 communes: Chư Hreng, Đăk Blà, Đăk Cấm, Đăk Năng, Đăk Rơ Wa, Đoàn Kết, Hòa Bình, Ia Chim, Kroong, Ngọk Bay, Vinh Quang.
