= Ya Dố =

Bahnar people woman

- Ya Do
- Vietnamese: 1765–1795
- Literal meaning: the General 's Maid of Honor

Ya Do (or Yă Dố, 1765 – 1795), also known as the General 's Maid of Honor; was the second wife of the leader Nguyen Nhac, and was in charge of providing food during the beginning of the Tay Son uprising in 18th century Vietnam.

She was a Bahnar people woman, from Plei de Hmau (now in Dong commune, Kbang district, Gia Lai province).

Her mother died when she was young, and she lived with her father. Her father (name unknown) was a wealthy Plei de Hmau patriarch, and a well-known sniper in the area. Growing up, Ya Do was taught martial arts by her father, skilled in farming, and reputable with the villagers.
