= Bahnar =

Bahnar may refer to:

- Bahnar people of Vietnam
- Bahnar language, their Bahnaric language
- Bahnaric languages, a subfamily of Austroasiatic languages
