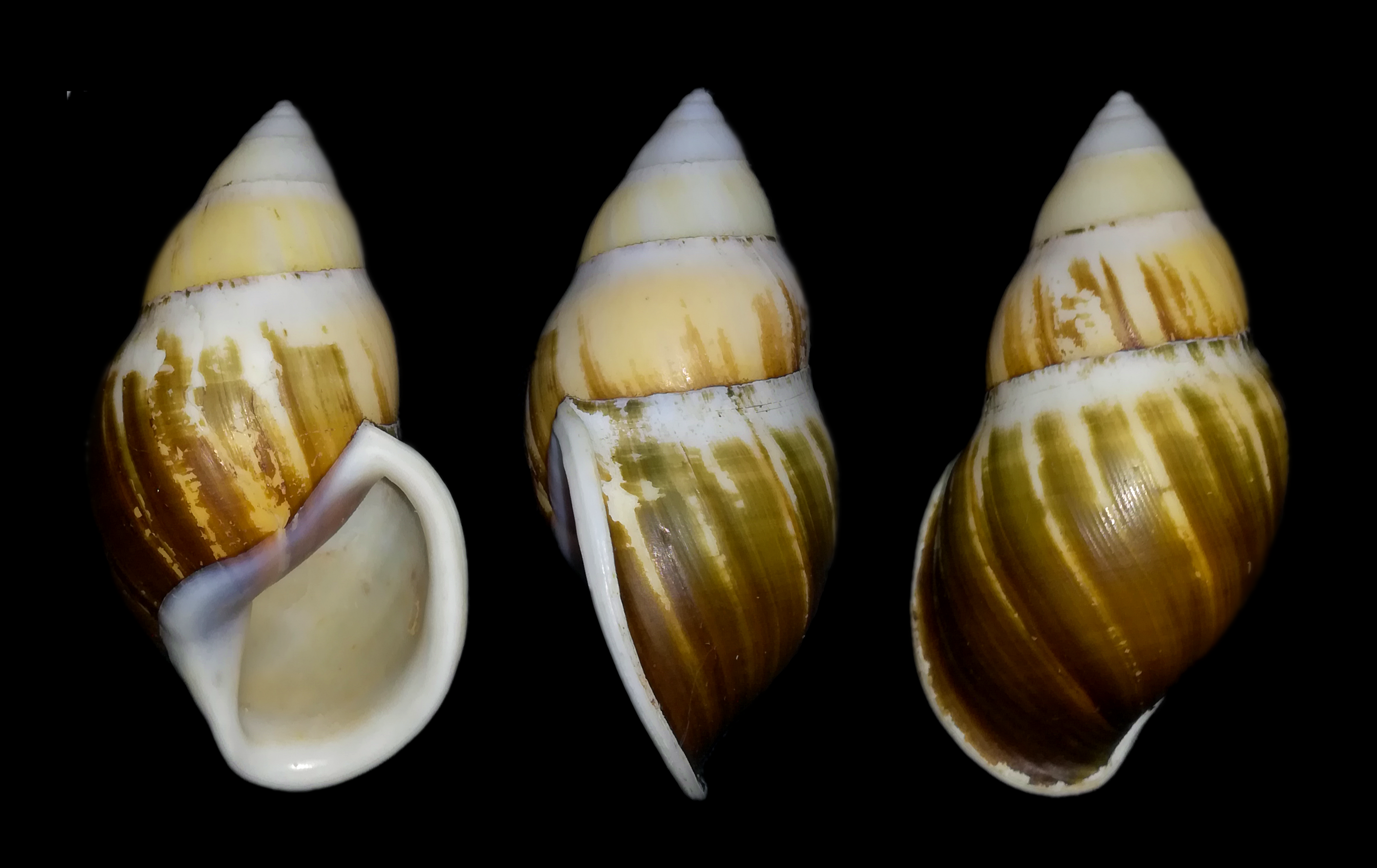

Scientific classification
- Kingdom: Animalia
- Phylum: Mollusca
- Class: Gastropoda
- Order: Stylommatophora
- Family: Camaenidae
- Genus: Amphidromus
- Species: A. placostylus

Binomial name
- Amphidromus placostylus Möllendorff, 1900

Synonyms
- Amphidromus johnstanisici Thach & F. Huber, 2017 junior subjective synonym

= Amphidromus placostylus =

Species of gastropod

Amphidromus placostylus is a species of large-sized air-breathing tree snail, an arboreal gastropod mollusc in the family Camaenidae.

== Description ==
The length of the shell attains 70 mm, its diameter 41 mm.

(Original description in Latin) The dextral shell is not rimate (without an umbilicus). It presents an ovate-oblong shape and a solid structure. Its surface appears slightly plicate-striate (with fold-like striations) and olive-brown, broadly brown-streaked. The spire is moderately elevated for the genus, exhibiting a ventricose-conoidal (swollen and cone-shaped) form. Comprising six and three-quarter somewhat convex whorls, it shows an impression behind the margined suture. The body whorl is rather convex and almost equals four-sevenths of the shell's height. The aperture is moderately oblique and ample, somewhat ear-shaped. The peristome appears rather broadly expanded and reflected, and thickly lipped. The columella is somewhat straight and striated, forming an obtuse angle with the basal margin and being appressed with a broad callus.

== Distribution ==
Amphidromus placostylus is known to inhabit Central Vietnam, Gia Lai Province, K'bang District.

== Habitat ==
Amphidromus placostylus are generally found in trees or areas with a high tree density.
