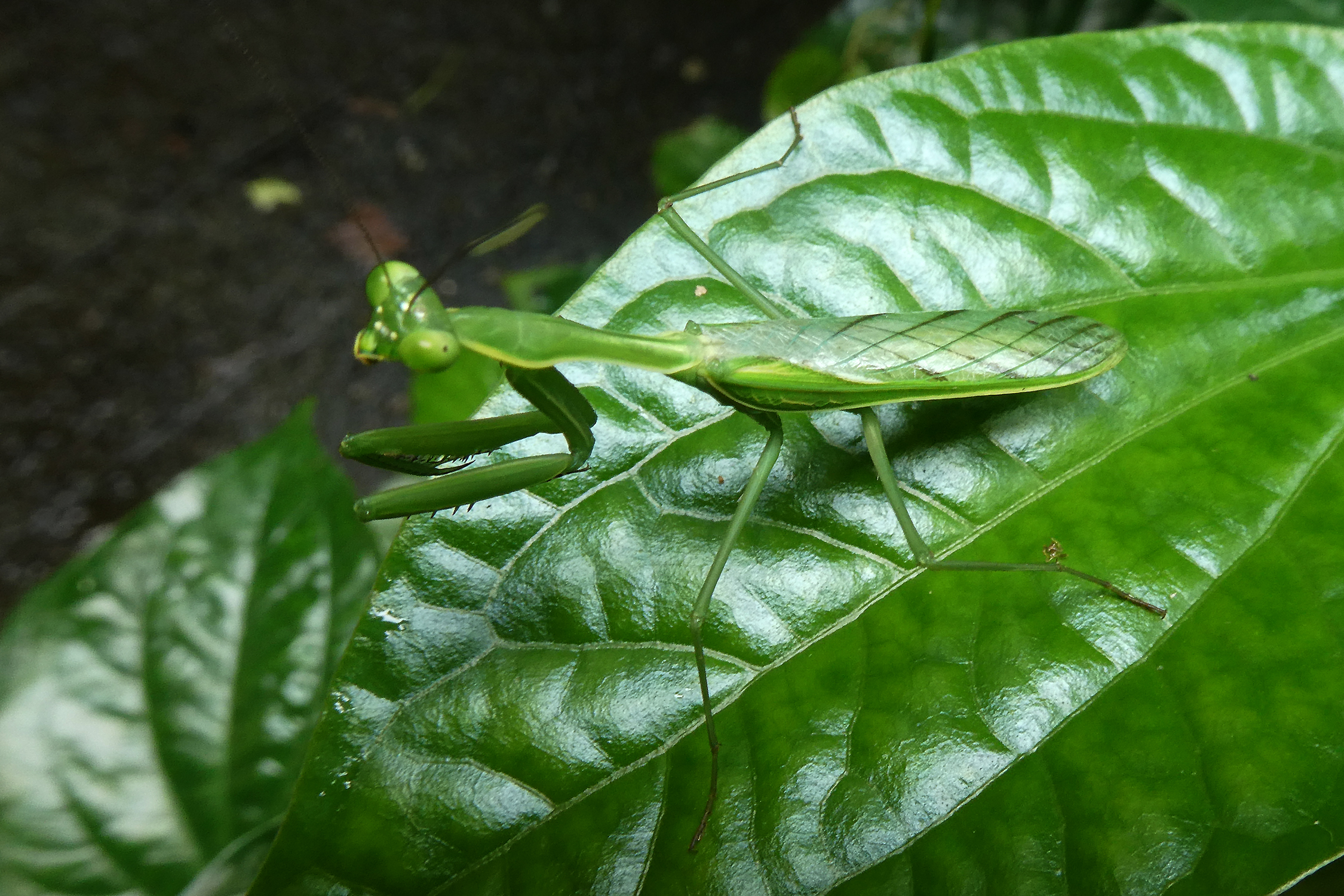
- Chlorocalis maternaschulzei, Vietnam

Scientific classification
- Kingdom: Animalia
- Phylum: Arthropoda
- Clade: Pancrustacea
- Class: Insecta
- Order: Mantodea
- Family: Mantidae
- Subfamily: Hierodulinae
- Tribe: Hierodulini
- Genus: Chlorocalis; Stiewe, Shcherbakov & Vermeersch, 2019

= Chlorocalis =

Genus of praying mantises

Chlorocalis is a genus of praying mantises in the family Mantidae, now placed in the tribe Hierodulini. Species can be found in the Indo-China region.

== Species ==
The Mantodea Species File lists:

- Chlorocalis maternaschulzei Stiewe, Vermeersch & Shcherbakov, 2019 Type locality: Nakhon Ratchasima Province, Thailand.
- Chlorocalis prasina Vermeersch, Shcherbakov & Stiewe, 2019 Type locality: Kon Tum Province, Vietnam.
