= Tetraserica gialaiensis =

Scientific classification
- Kingdom: Animalia
- Phylum: Arthropoda
- Class: Insecta
- Order: Coleoptera
- Suborder: Polyphaga
- Infraorder: Scarabaeiformia
- Family: Scarabaeidae
- Genus: Tetraserica
- Species: T. gialaiensis

Binomial name
- Tetraserica gialaiensis Pham & Ahrens, 2023

Species of beetle

Tetraserica gialaiensis is a species of beetle of the family Scarabaeidae. It is found in Myanmar and Vietnam.

== Description ==
Adults reach a length of about 8.4–8.5 mm. They have a dark brown, oval body. The dorsal surface is glabrous and without setae.

== Etymology ==
The species is named after its occurrence in the Gia Lai province.
