= Tetraserica semikontumensis =

Scientific classification
- Kingdom: Animalia
- Phylum: Arthropoda
- Class: Insecta
- Order: Coleoptera
- Suborder: Polyphaga
- Infraorder: Scarabaeiformia
- Family: Scarabaeidae
- Genus: Tetraserica
- Species: T. semikontumensis

Binomial name
- Tetraserica semikontumensis Pham & Ahrens, 2023

Species of beetle

Tetraserica semikontumensis is a species of beetle of the family Scarabaeidae. It is found in Vietnam.

== Description ==
Adults reach a length of about 9.3–10 mm. They have a reddish brown, oval body. The dorsal surface is shiny and glabrous.

== Etymology ==
The species name is derived from Latin semi- (meaning half) and the species name kontumensis and refers to its similarity to Tetraserica kontumensis.
