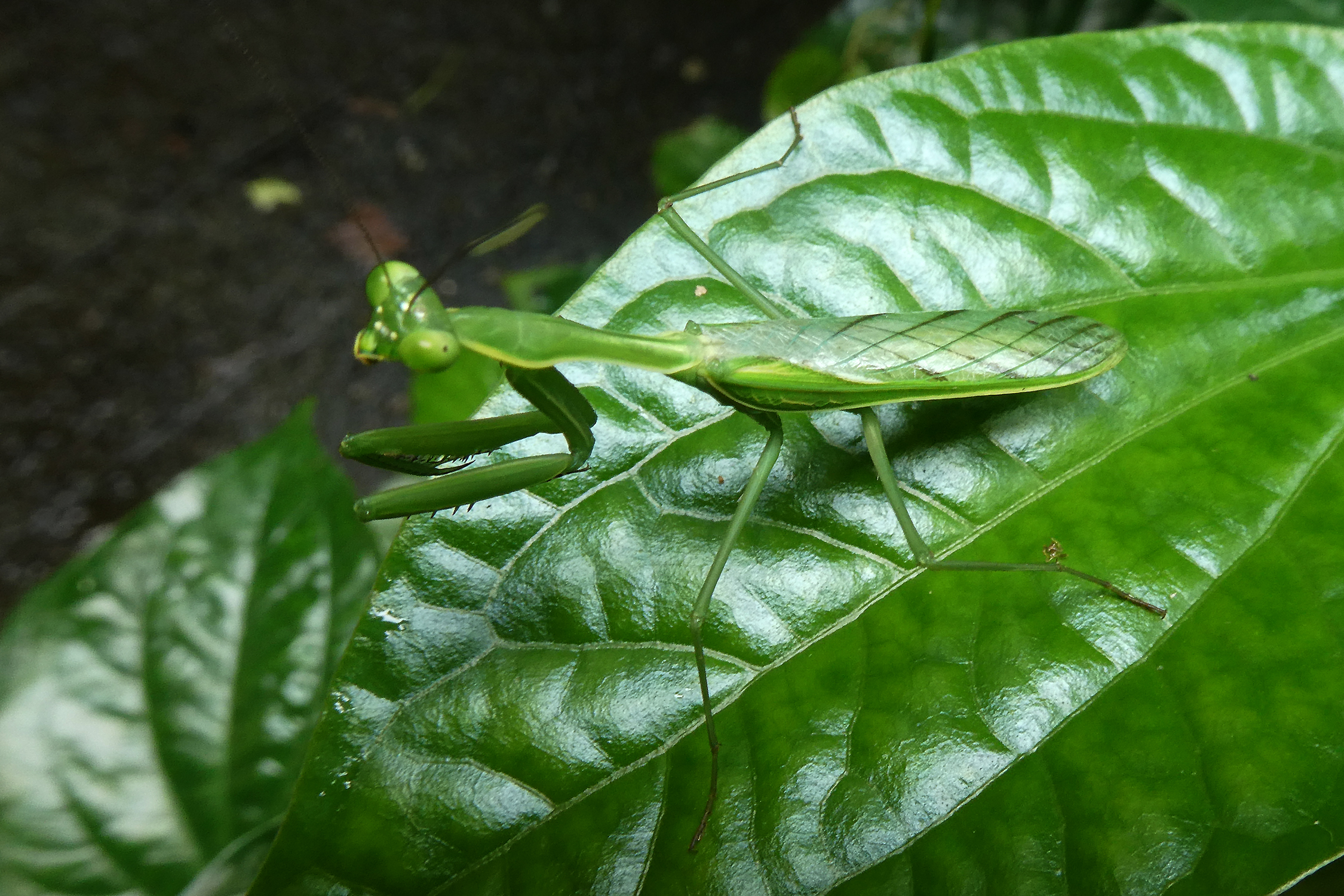
- C. maternaschulzei in Cat Tien National Park

Scientific classification
- Kingdom: Animalia
- Phylum: Arthropoda
- Clade: Pancrustacea
- Class: Insecta
- Order: Mantodea
- Family: Mantidae
- Subfamily: Hierodulinae
- Tribe: Hierodulini
- Genus: Chlorocalis
- Species: C. maternaschulzei

Binomial name
- Chlorocalis maternaschulzei Vermeersch, Stiewe, Shcherbakov, 2019

= Chlorocalis maternaschulzei =

Species of praying mantis

Chlorocalis maternaschulzei is a species of praying mantis in the family Mantidae and tribe Hierodulini. Records of this species are from the seasonal tropical forests of Thailand and Vietnam; the type specimen is from Nakhon Ratchasima Province.
