= Kông Chro district =

Coordinates: 13.667°N 108.667°E

Kông Chro district Huyện Kông Chro
- District
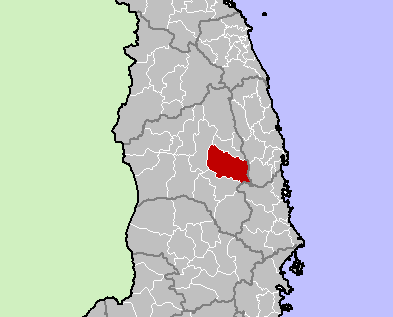
- Location in Gia Lai province
- Country: Vietnam
- Region: Central Highlands
- Province: Gia Lai province
- Capital: Kông Chro

Area
  - Total: 555.87 sq mi (1,439.70 km^{2})

Population (31/12/2024)
  - Total: 59,956
  - Density: 107.86/sq mi (41.645/km^{2})
- Time zone: UTC+7 (Indochina Time)

Kông Chro is a district (huyện) of Gia Lai province in the Central Highlands region of Vietnam.

As of 2024 the district had a population of 59,956. The district covers an area of 1,439.70 km². The district capital lies at Kông Chro.
