= Pleiku Lake =

Freshwater lake in Vietnam

Coordinates: 14°02′38″N 108°00′00″E

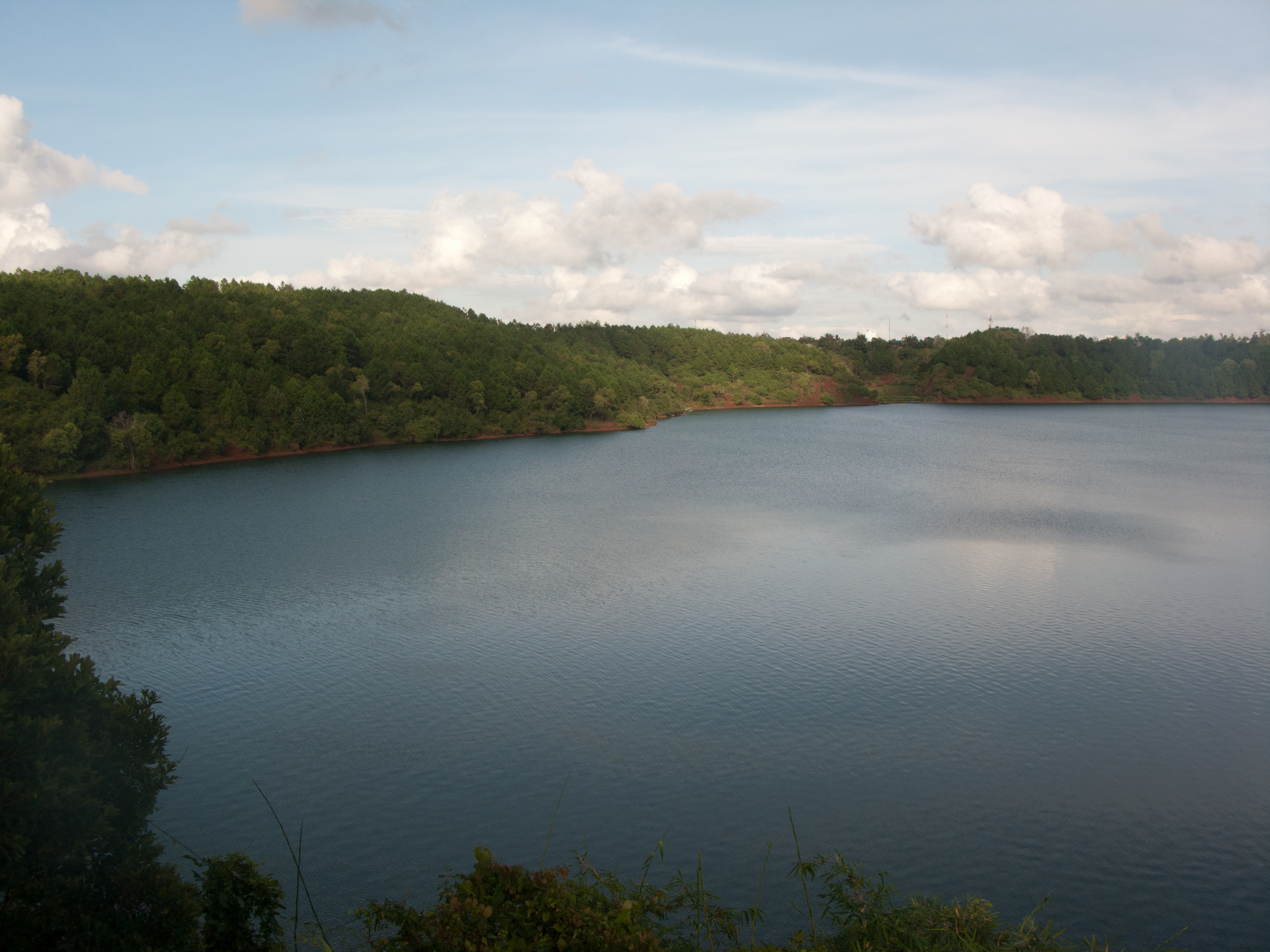
Pleiku Lake

Pleiku Lake (Vietnamese: Biển Hồ Pleiku) is a freshwater lake in Biển Hồ Township, Pleiku City, Gia Lai Province, Vietnam. It is a volcanic crater lake. Due to its large area, the waves are turbulent like sea waves during the rainy season, so the Jarai people around the lake call it T'Nung, which means "sea on the mountain".

Pleiku Lake is located 7 kilometers northwest of the city center of Pleiku, and is the water source of Pleiku. The lake is about 800 meters above sea level, 12 to 19 meters deep, and about 40 meters deep. Water storage capacity of 30 million cubic meters. It consists of three connected craters. After volcanic activity ceased millions of years ago, lava deposited on the bottom of the lake and water accumulated to form the lake. Due to the unfathomable depth of the lake, there is a legend among the locals that the bottom of the lake is connected to the sea, and if the wood is thrown into the lake for one night, it will be taken to the seaport of Binh Dinh to Quy Nhon by water. Pleiku Lake covers an area of 228 hectares, and the water surface can reach more than 400 hectares in the rainy season. Although the lake is located in a higher caldera and is not fed by a stream, it never dries up even in the dry season and flows continuously through a small stream, so it is called "the jade in the red soil. the eye of Pleiku".

The pine forests and lotus-filled reeds along the lake are hiding places for birds such as kingfishers, geese and whistling duck. There are various freshwater fish such as carp, trout, and eel in the lake, as well as reptiles such as turtles and soft-shelled turtles. There is a statue of Guanyin Bodhisattva with a height of 15.3 meters by the lake. Behind the statue are five feng shui stone pillars representing the five Phases. The Lake District is the traditional area of the Gia Lai and Ba Na peoples, and the tea produced is a well-known tea variety in Vietnam. On November 16, 1988, Pleiku Lake was recognized as a scenic spot by the Ministry of Culture and Information of Vietnam. In September 2014, the evaluation committee composed of the Vietnam Journalists Association, tourism associations, travel agencies and other units listed Pleiku Lake as one of the top 5 natural and beautiful poetic lakes in Vietnam.
