= Kon Tum =

Ward in Quảng Ngãi province, Vietnam

- Ward
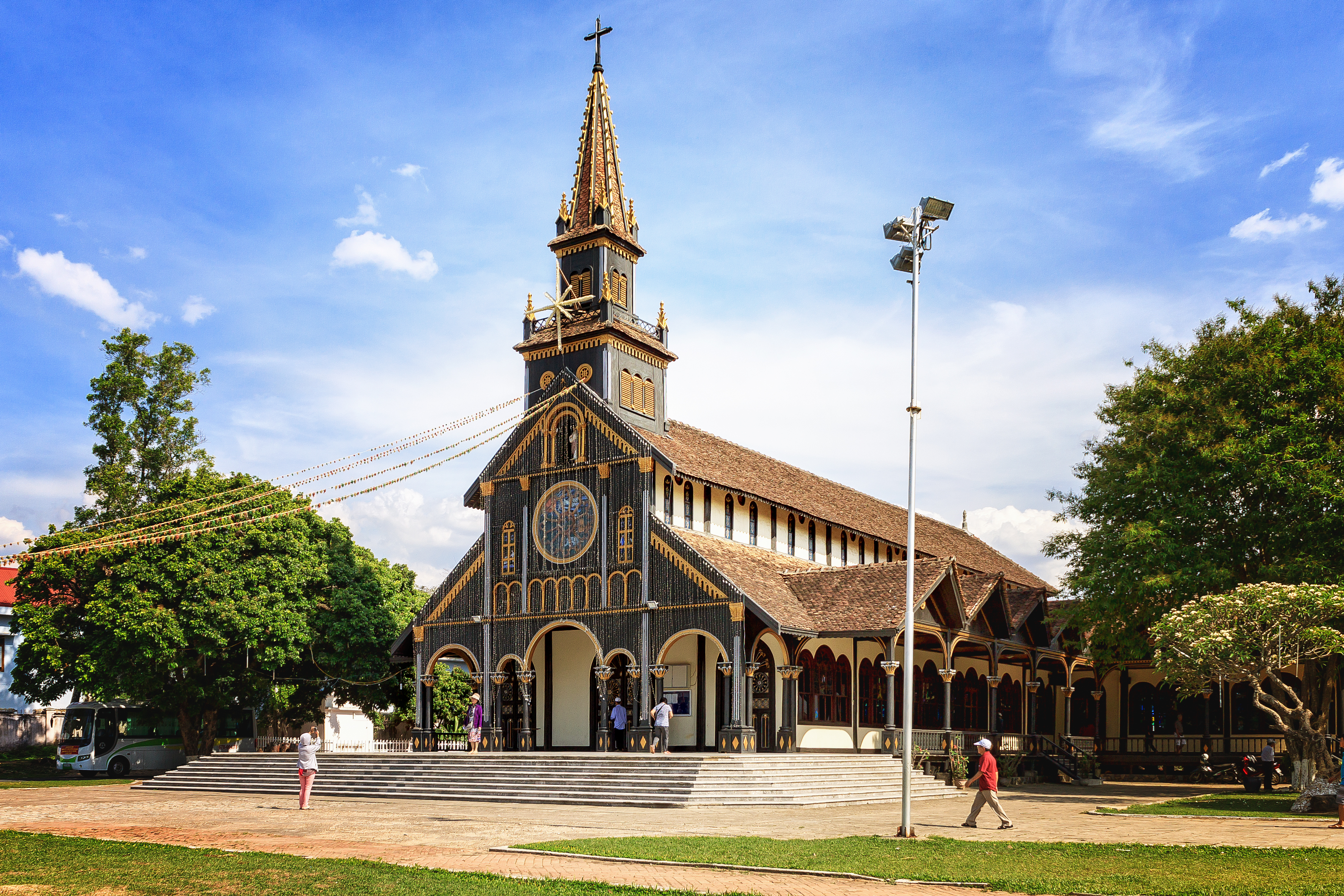
- Kon Tum Cathedral
- Interactive map of Kon Tum
- Location in Vietnam
- Coordinates: 14°21′42″N 108°0′30″E
- Country: Vietnam
- Province: Quảng Ngãi
- Established: June 16, 2025

Government
  - Type: Ward

Area
  - Total: 19.14 km^{2} (7.39 sq mi)
- Elevation: 525 m (1,722 ft)

Population (2025)
  - Total: 77,456 people
  - Density: 475/km^{2} (1,230/sq mi)
- Climate: Aw

Kon Tum is a ward of Quảng Ngãi province in Vietnam. It is located inland in the Central Highlands region of Vietnam, near the borders of Laos and Cambodia.

Historically, this area has been inhabited by the indigenous Ba Na people, which led to the name Kon Tum, meaning "Village by the Lake" in the Ba Na language. Its unique location features flat and fertile land, enriched by the Dak Bla River, and a convergence of various ethnic groups over time. Among these, the Kinh people, hailing from provinces such as Quang Nam, Quang Ngai, and Binh Dinh, have settled here. In the years 1841-1850, French missionaries, en route to the Central Highlands, established the first Christian mission in this region. By 1893, the colonial French authorities established the Kon Tum administrative agency, headed by Father Vialleton, and from that point, the name Kon Tum became officially used. Subsequently, the provincial administrative unit adopted this name. Kon Tum City, once a sparsely populated and desolate area, has evolved into a hub for settlement, commerce, and governance throughout the province's rich history. Prior to 2025, Kon Tum holds the status of Class-2 Provincial city.

Prior to Vietnam's 2025 administrative reforms, Kon Tum was the capital of the formerly Kon Tum province.

== Geography ==
Kon Tum ward is situated in the southwestern part of Quảng Ngãi province, within a basin landscape at an elevation of approximately 525 meters above sea level. It is encircled by the Dak Bla River valley. The city is located 547 kilometers north of Ho Chi Minh City, 292 kilometers south of Da Nang, and 1,087 kilometers south of the capital Hanoi. Additionally, it is 190 kilometers southwest of Cẩm Thành ward. Kon Tum ward shares its geographical boundaries as follows:

- To the north, it borders Đắk Cấm ward.
- To the west, it borders Ngọk Bay commune.
- To the southwest, it borders Đắk Bla
- To the south and east, it borders Đắk Rơ Wa commune.

Kon Tum ward has an area of 19.14 km² and a population of 77,456 people in 2025.

== History ==
After the People's Army of Vietnam invaded South Vietnam on March 30, 1972 during the Easter Offensive, two divisions attempted to capture Kon Tum, but failed. In March 1975, however, Kon Tum was overrun during the Ho Chi Minh Campaign and large numbers of refugees were forced to flee east to the south central coast.

Kon Tum has several vestiges of the French colonial period, as well as several tribal villages directly in the suburbs of the Vietnamese-reconstructed town. Among the town's landmarks, there is a Roman Catholic wooden church on discrete stilts and a large French-built seminary which hosts a small museum on local hill tribes. French missionary presence in Kon Tum traces back to 1851.

== Climate ==
Kon Tum has a tropical savanna climate (Köppen Aw) with a wet season from April to November, a dry season from November to April, and consistently very warm-to-hot temperatures with high-to-oppressive humidity year-round.

Climate data for Kon Tum, elevation 536 m (1,759 ft)
Month	Jan	Feb	Mar	Apr	May	Jun	Jul	Aug	Sep	Oct	Nov	Dec	Year
Record high °C (°F)	35.5 (95.9)	38.2 (100.8)	39.8 (103.6)	39.5 (103.1)	39.5 (103.1)	35.6 (96.1)	34.2 (93.6)	34.0 (93.2)	34.5 (94.1)	35.0 (95.0)	33.7 (92.7)	35.1 (95.2)	39.8 (103.6)
Mean daily maximum °C (°F)	28.0 (82.4)	30.3 (86.5)	32.4 (90.3)	33.2 (91.8)	31.7 (89.1)	29.8 (85.6)	29.1 (84.4)	28.9 (84.0)	29.1 (84.4)	29.1 (84.4)	28.1 (82.6)	27.0 (80.6)	29.7 (85.5)
Daily mean °C (°F)	21.1 (70.0)	22.8 (73.0)	24.8 (76.6)	25.9 (78.6)	25.7 (78.3)	25.0 (77.0)	24.5 (76.1)	24.2 (75.6)	24.0 (75.2)	23.6 (74.5)	22.6 (72.7)	21.1 (70.0)	23.8 (74.8)
Mean daily minimum °C (°F)	15.6 (60.1)	16.9 (62.4)	19.3 (66.7)	21.3 (70.3)	22.1 (71.8)	22.2 (72.0)	21.9 (71.4)	21.8 (71.2)	21.4 (70.5)	20.1 (68.2)	18.5 (65.3)	16.5 (61.7)	19.8 (67.6)
Record low °C (°F)	4.9 (40.8)	5.9 (42.6)	8.5 (47.3)	13.3 (55.9)	15.9 (60.6)	13.9 (57.0)	16.9 (62.4)	17.8 (64.0)	16.3 (61.3)	11.9 (53.4)	8.9 (48.0)	5.9 (42.6)	4.9 (40.8)
Average rainfall mm (inches)	1.0 (0.04)	7.0 (0.28)	39.6 (1.56)	97.3 (3.83)	237.2 (9.34)	257.0 (10.12)	314.1 (12.37)	336.1 (13.23)	313.1 (12.33)	180.3 (7.10)	58.0 (2.28)	8.0 (0.31)	1,854.7 (73.02)
Average rainy days	0.5	1.1	4.7	9.4	18.2	21.2	24.2	25.6	22.3	13.8	6.1	1.5	148.3
Average relative humidity (%)	70.8	68.3	68.2	71.7	78.7	83.6	85.1	86.5	85.7	81.2	76.7	73.3	77.2
Mean monthly sunshine hours	269.3	253.6	264.8	235.6	203.6	152.6	138.6	127.4	125.9	181.5	208.1	241.7	2,569.6
Source 1: Vietnam Institute for Building Science and Technology
Source 2: The Yearbook of Indochina (1932-1933)
