= K'Bang district =

Kbang district Huyện Kbang
- District
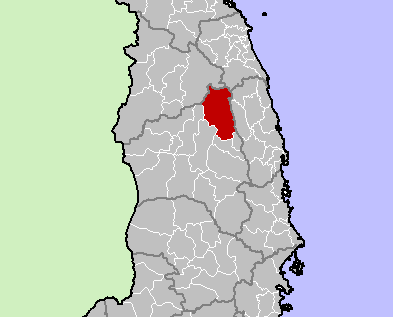
- Location in Gia Lai province
- Country: Vietnam
- Region: Central Highlands
- Province: Gia Lai province
- Capital: Kbang

Area
  - Total: 711.37 sq mi (1,842.44 km^{2})

Population (31/12/2024)
  - Total: 77,130
  - Density: 108.4/sq mi (41.86/km^{2})
- Time zone: UTC+7 (Indochina Time)

Kbang is a district (huyện) of Gia Lai province in the northern part of the Central Highlands region of Vietnam.

As of 2024 the district had a population of 77,130. The district covers an area of 1,842.44 km². The district capital lies at Kbang.

The district was established in 1986 and was quickly filled by immigrants from other parts of Vietnam, mostly from the north and central parts. Agriculture is the top business sector which employs a large percentage of the population, followed by forestry and government servants.
