= Kon Tum province =

Former province of Vietnam

Kon Tum
- Province
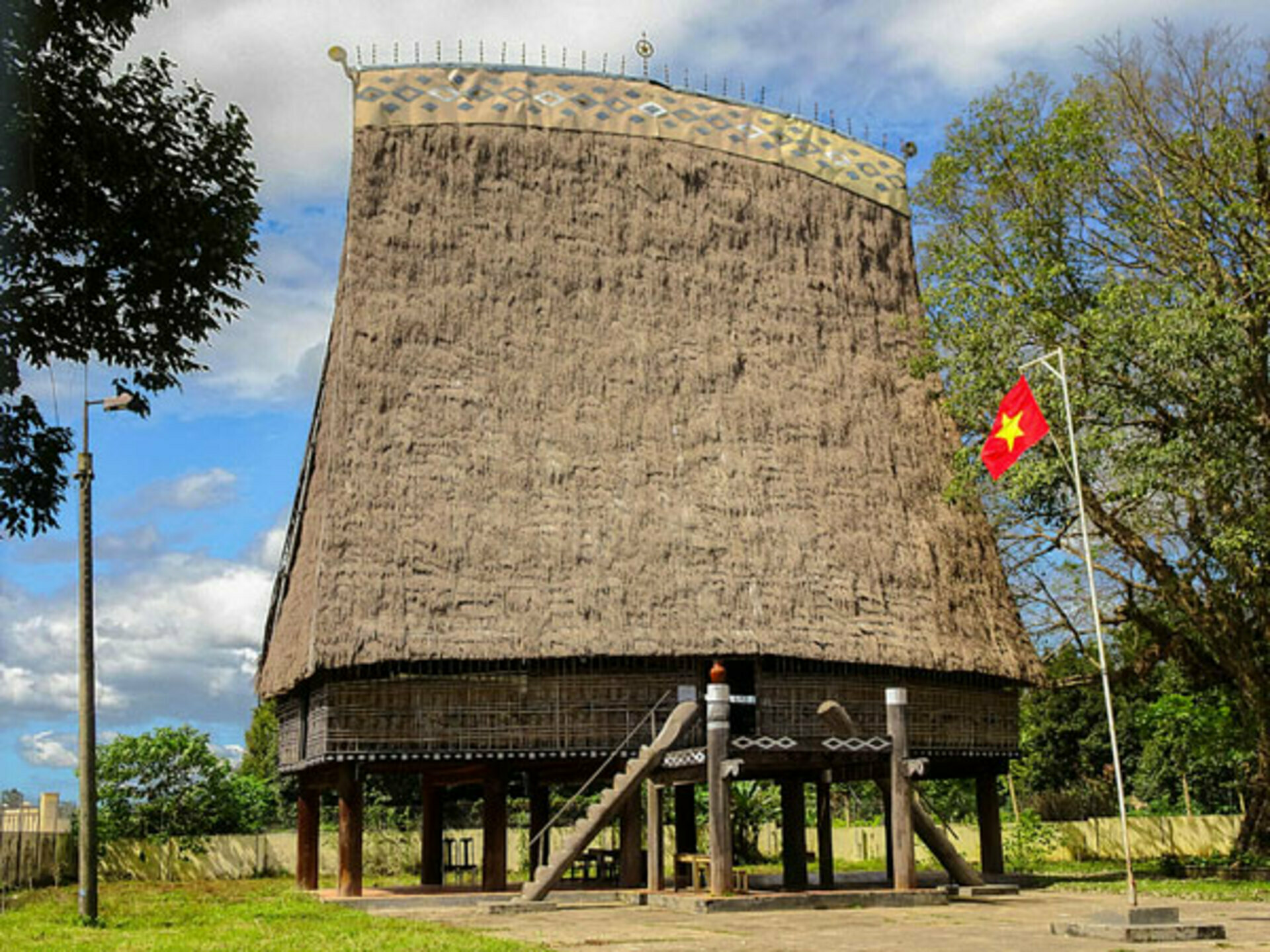
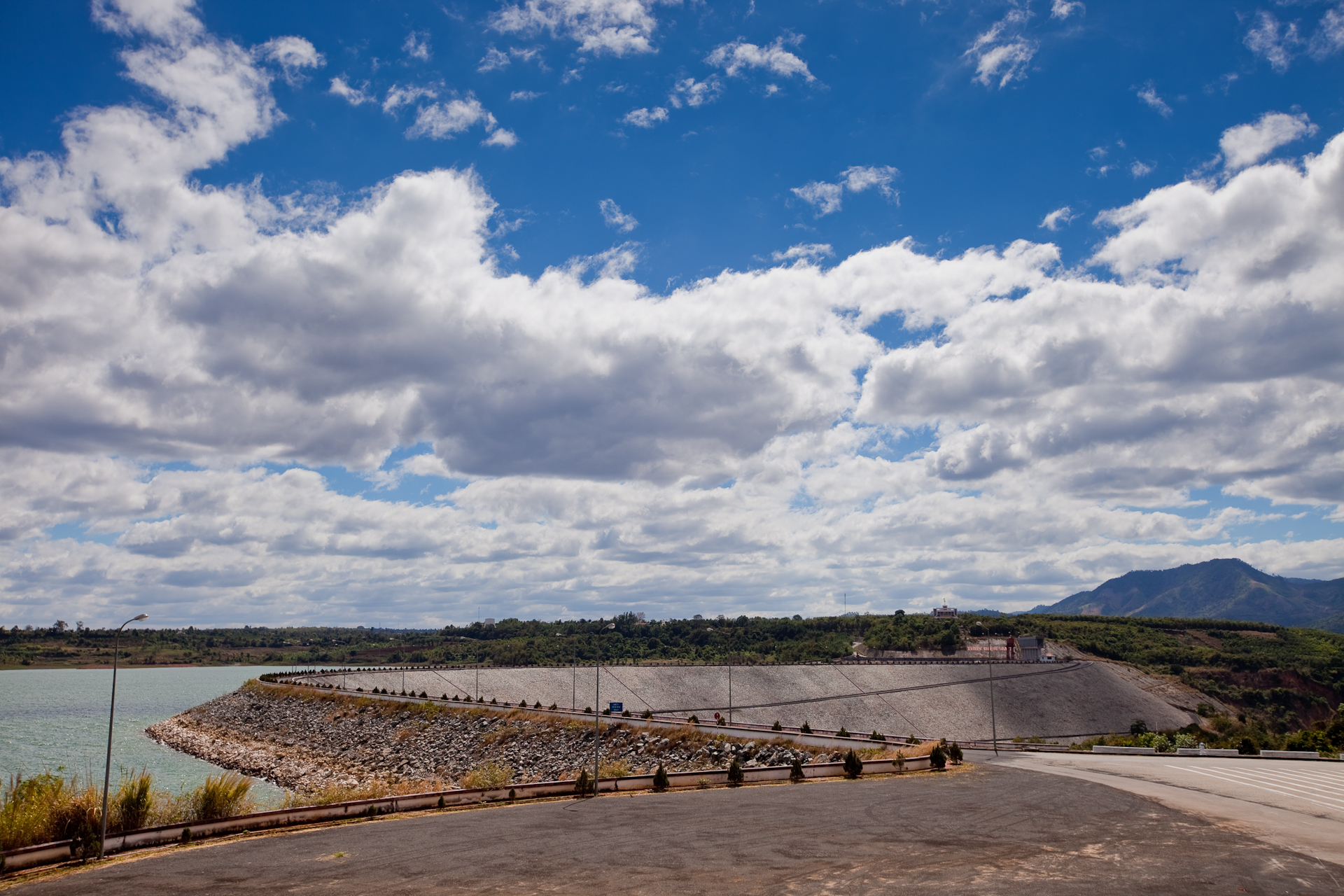
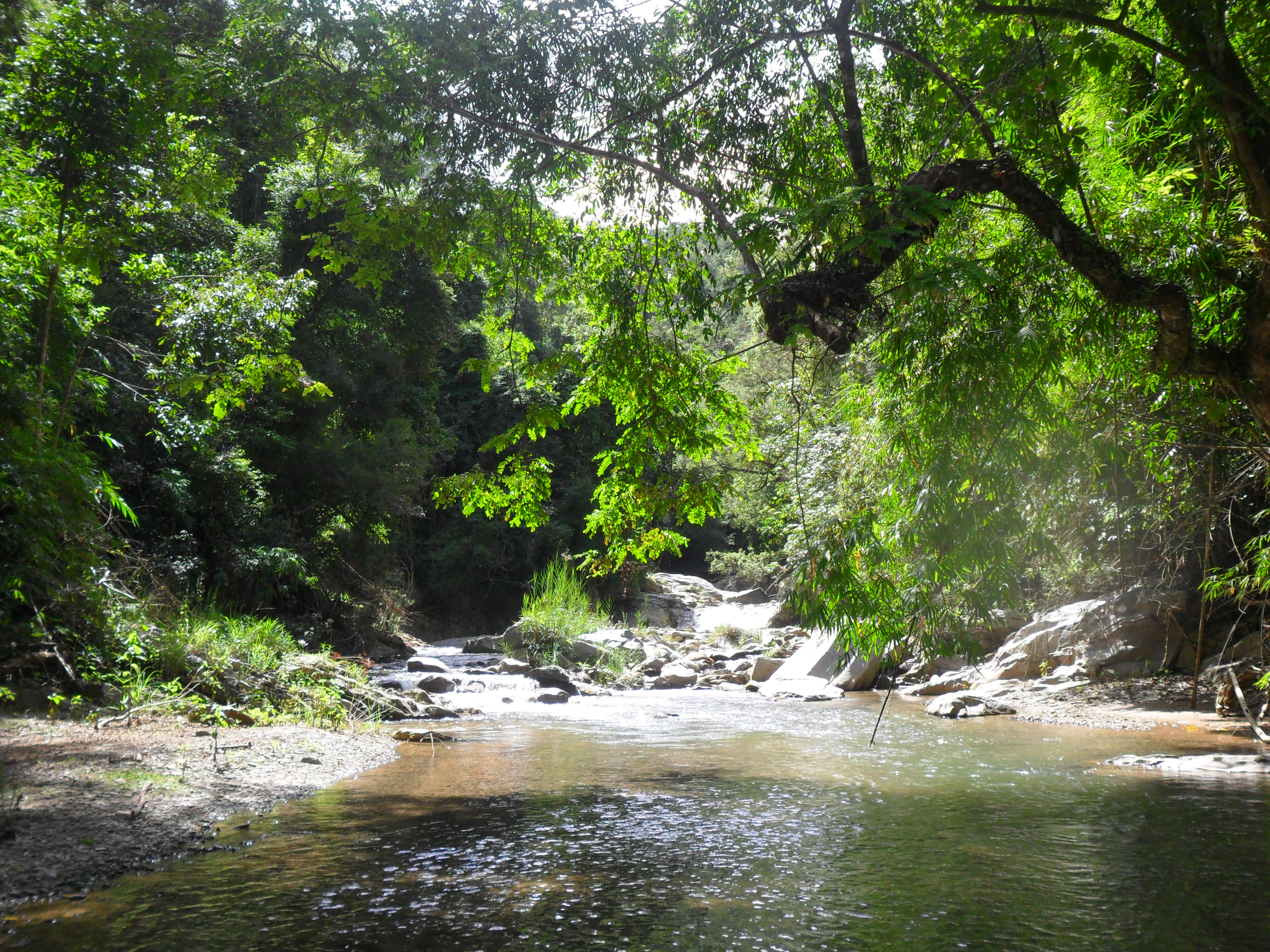
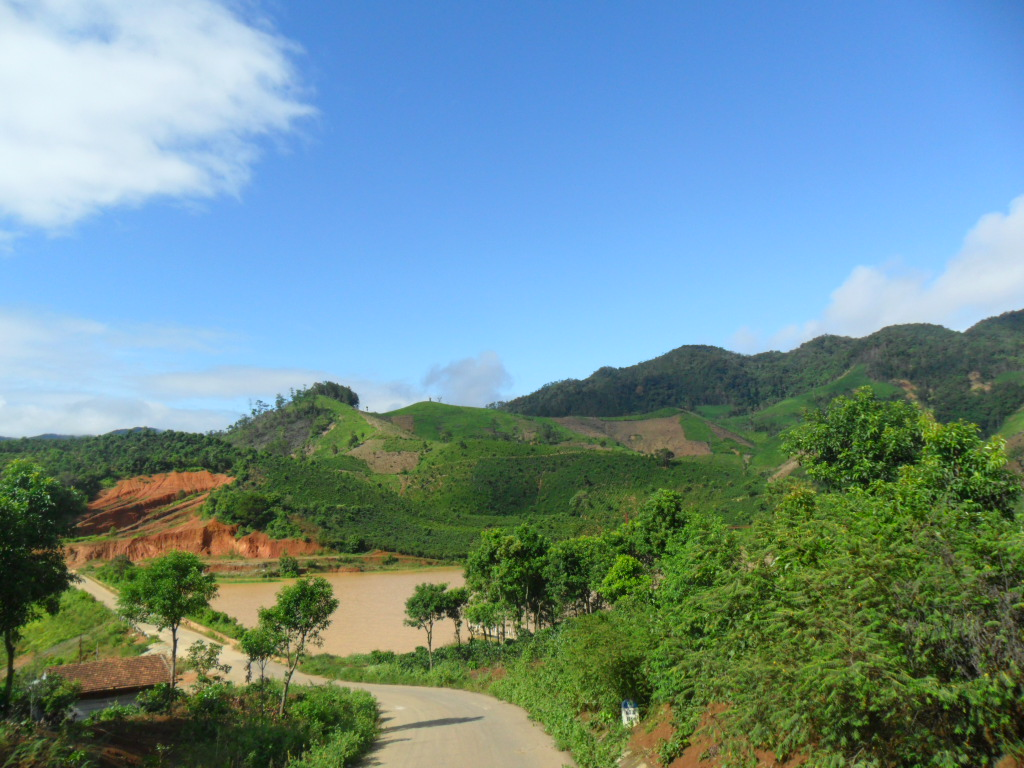
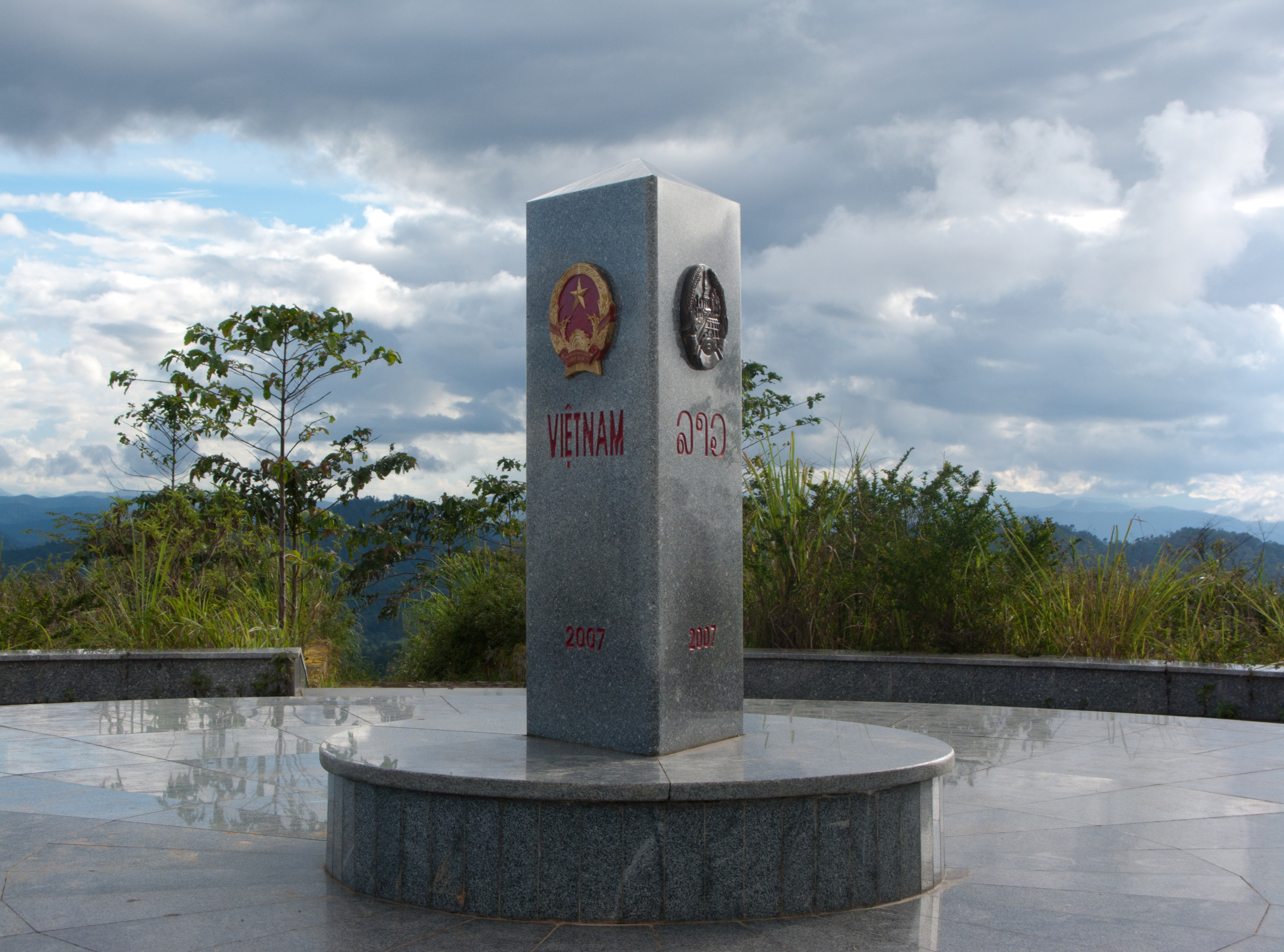
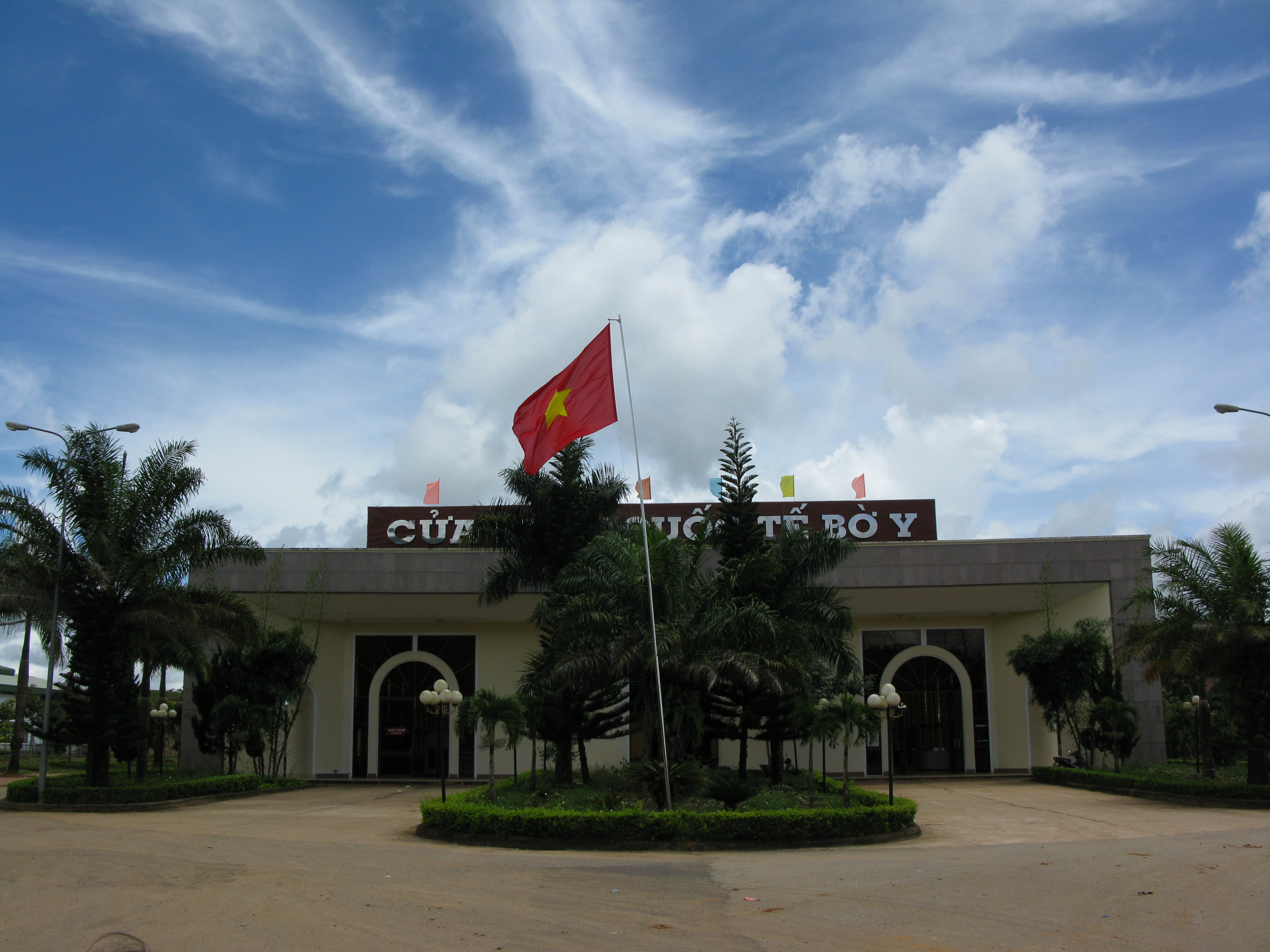
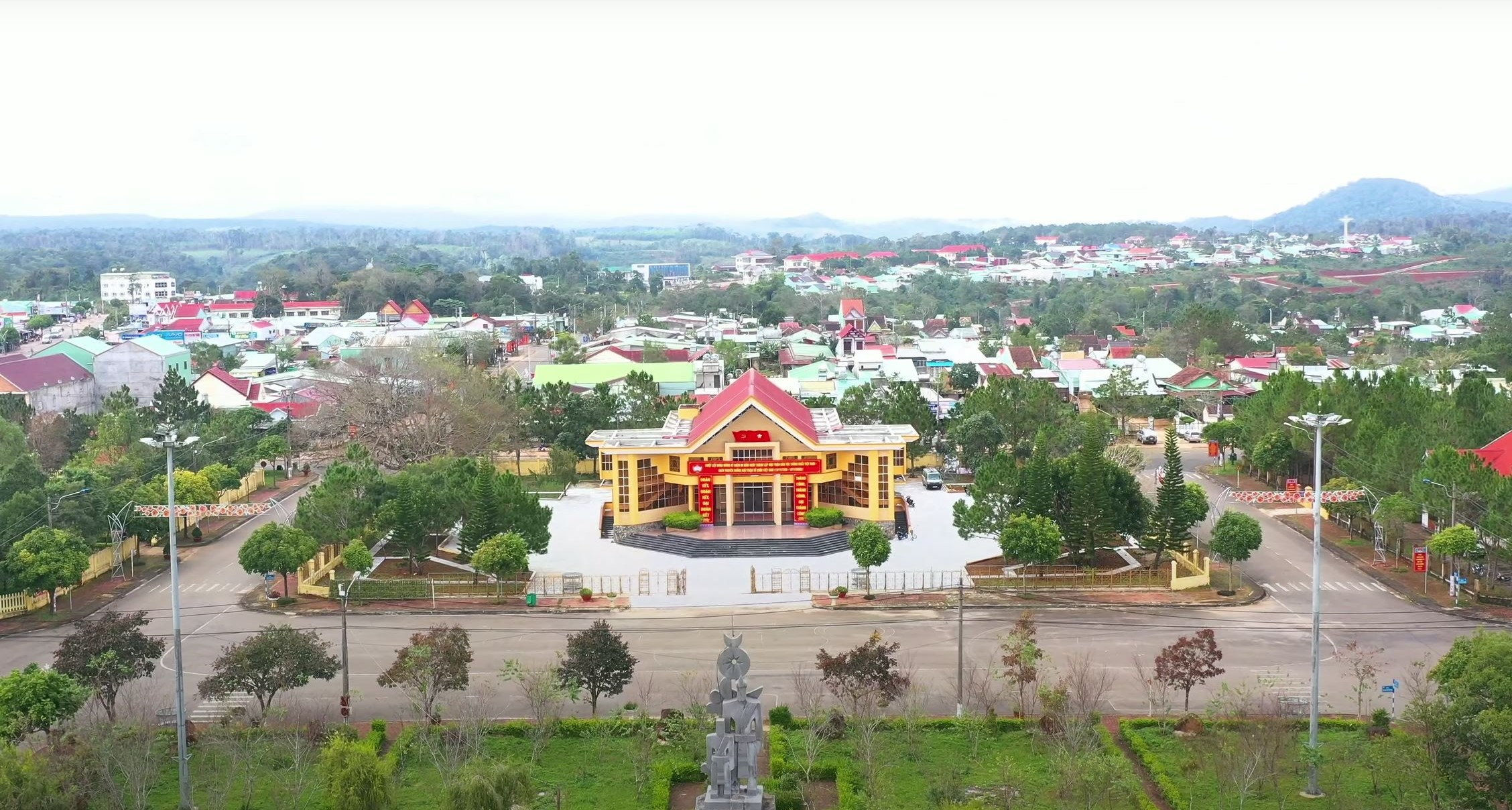
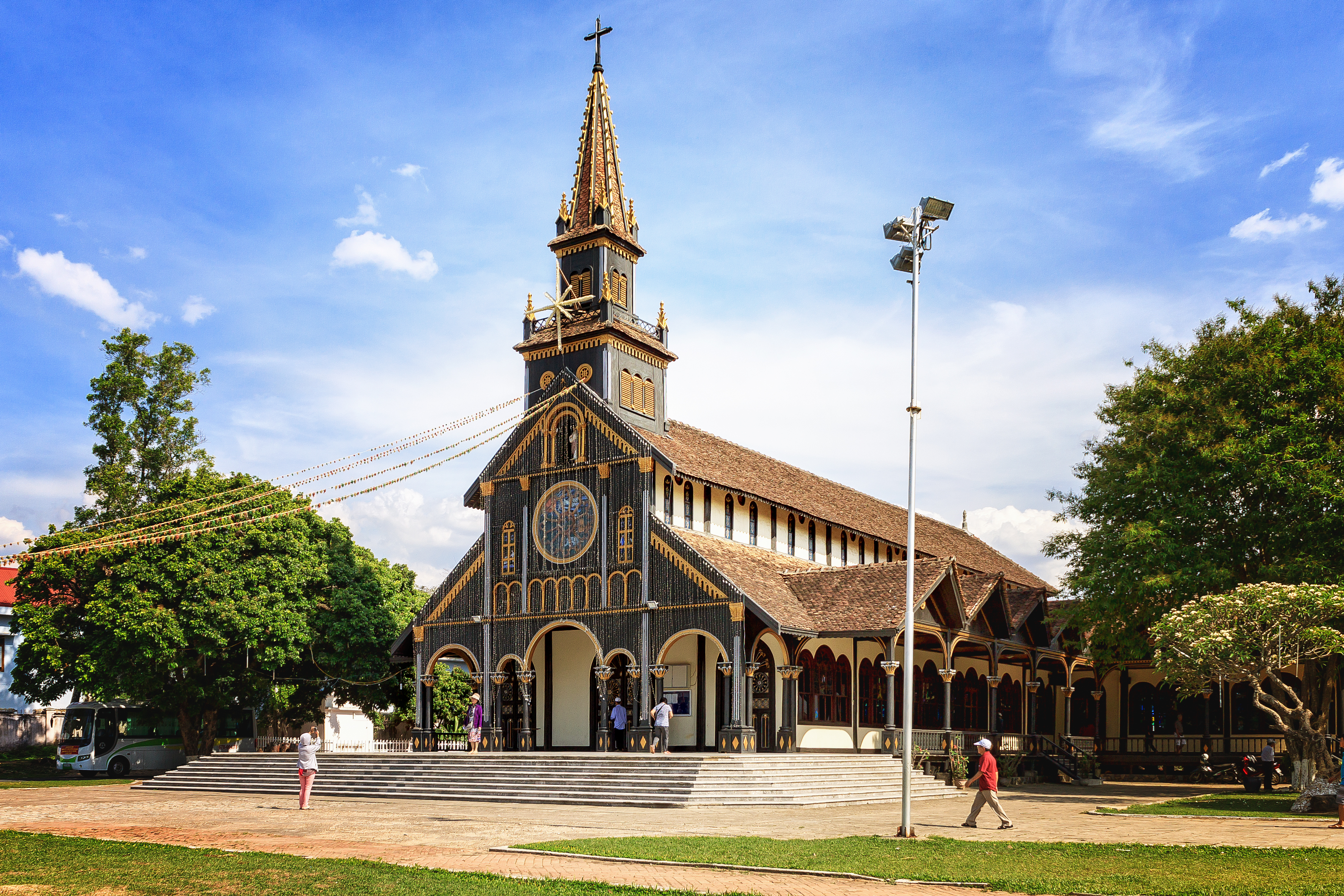
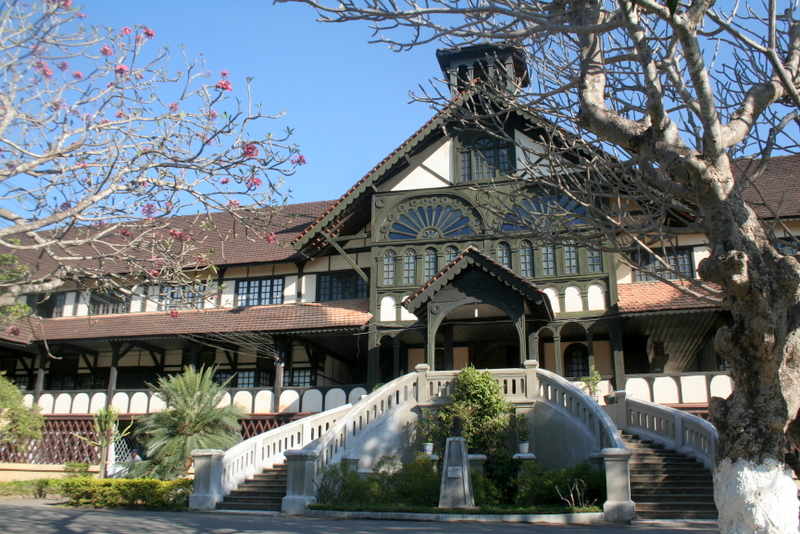
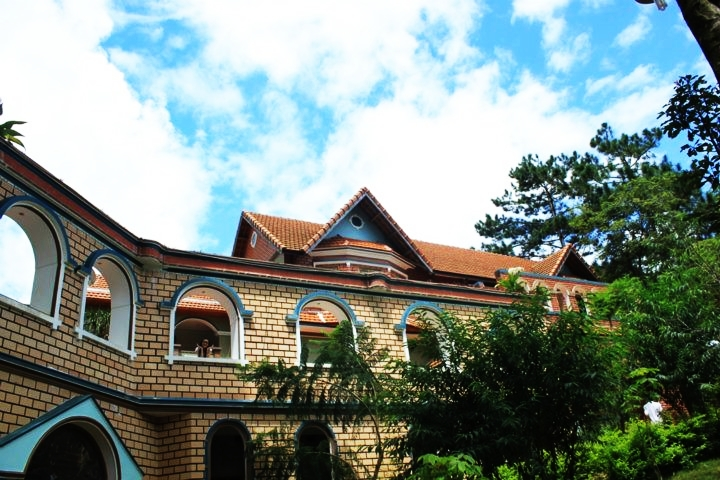
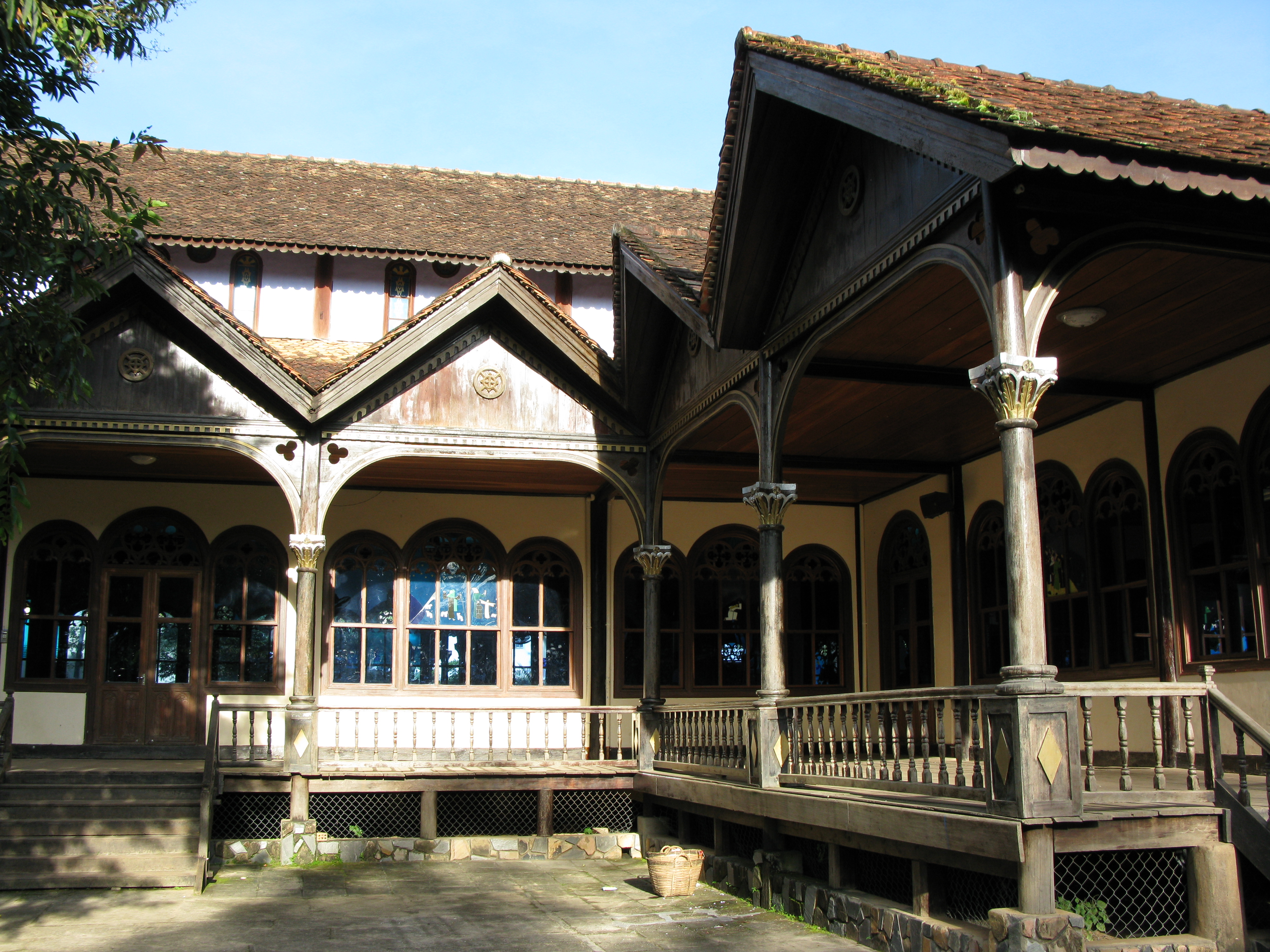
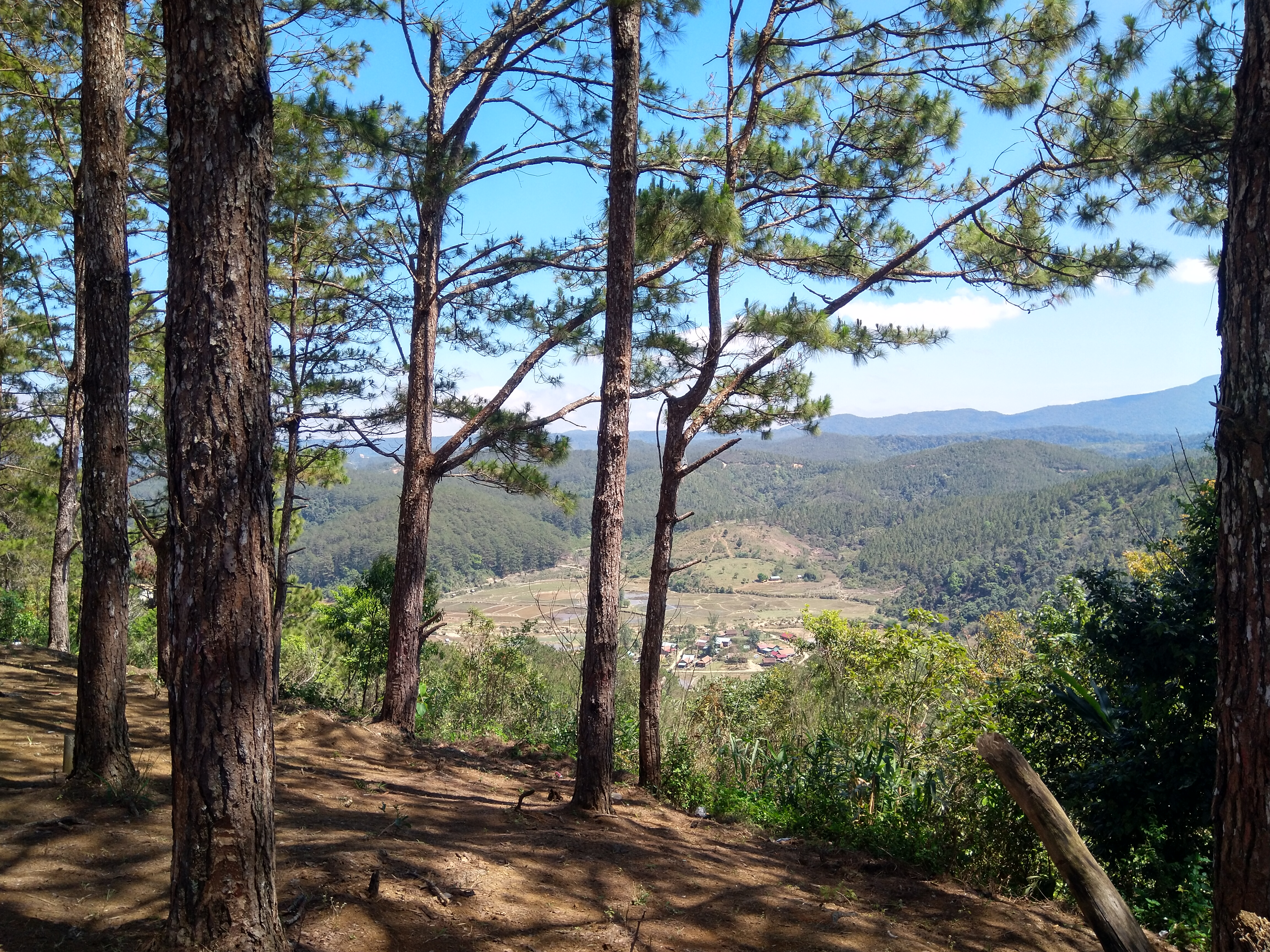
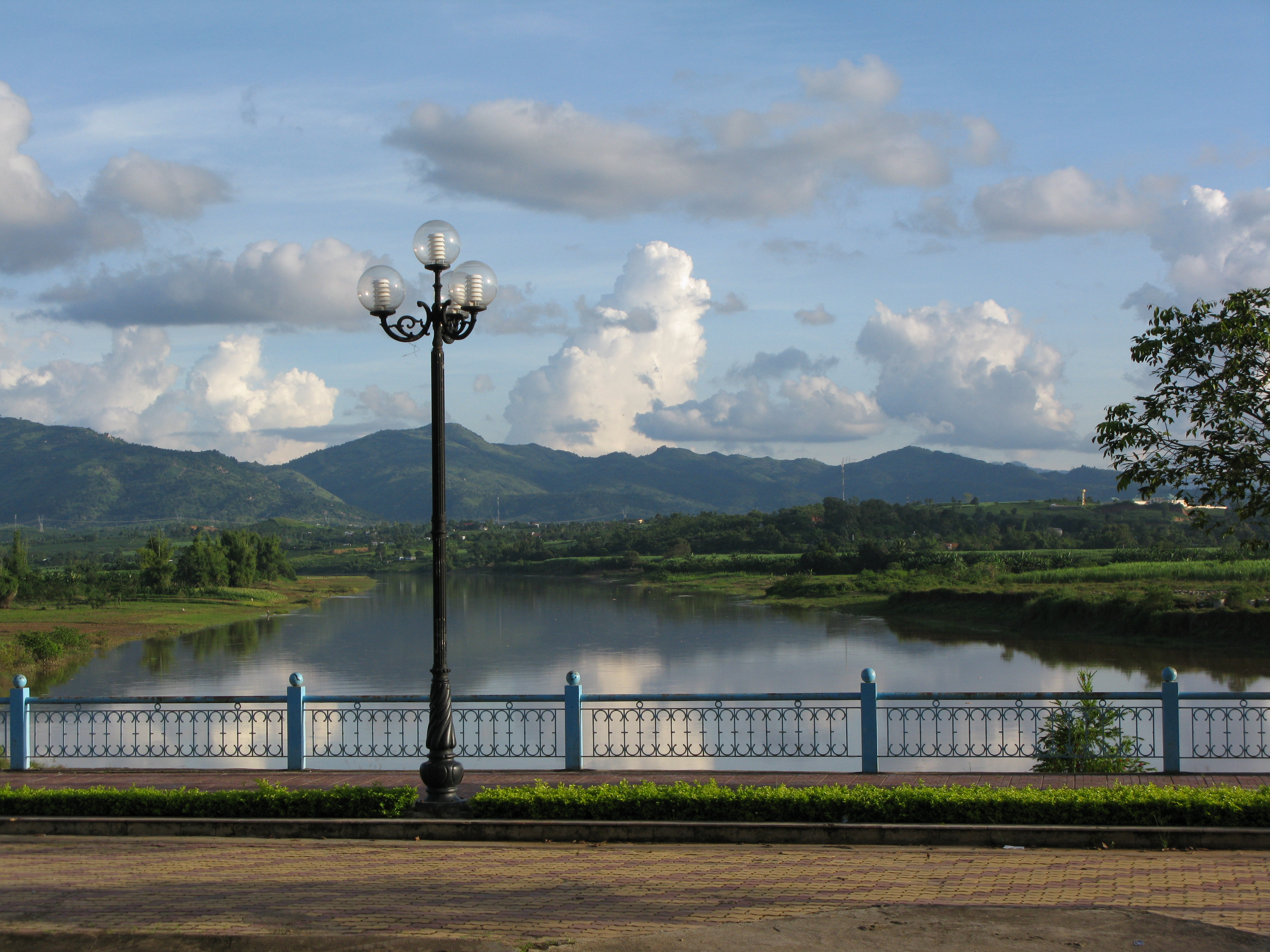
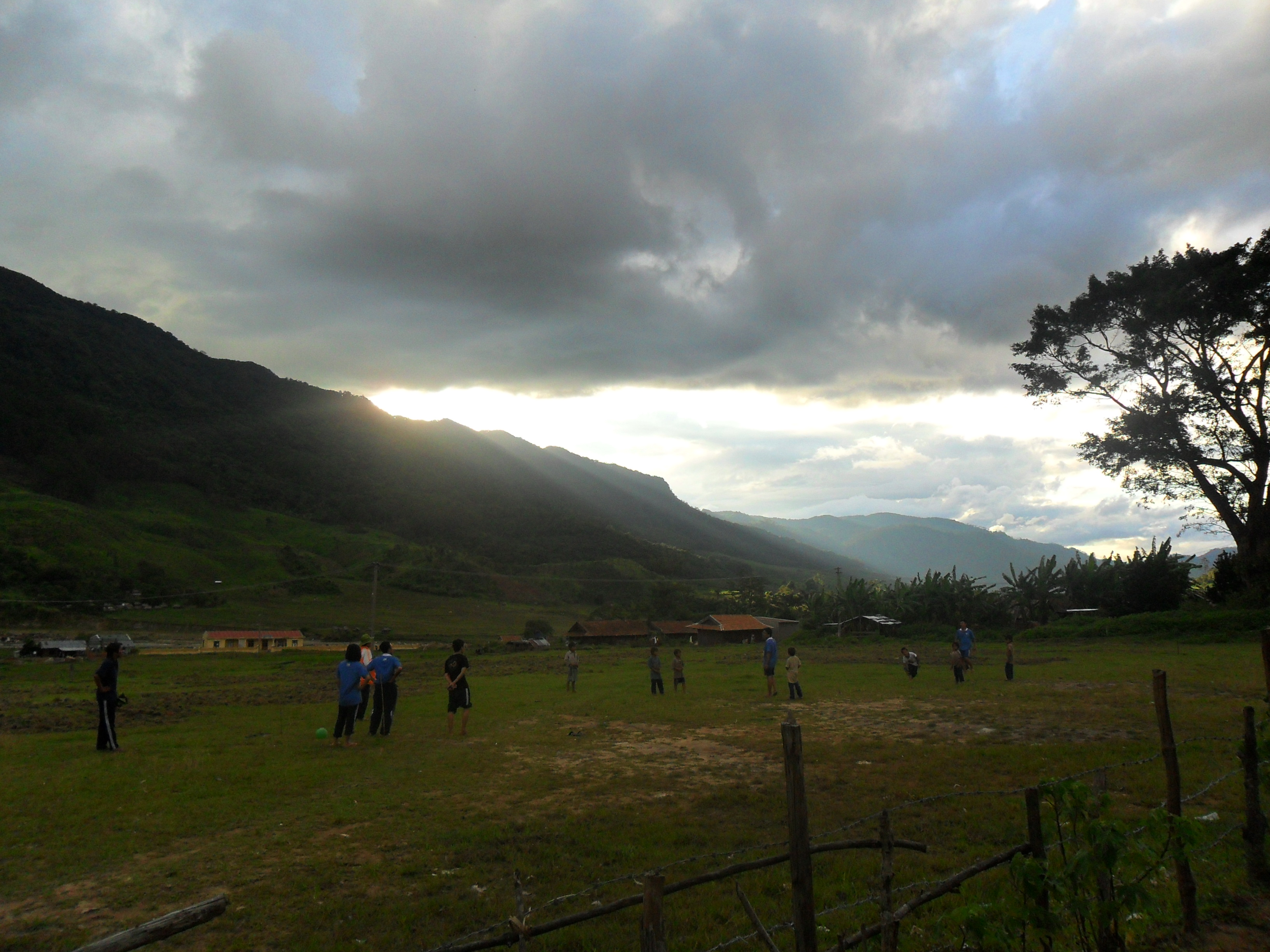
- Kon Klor Rông House • Yaly Dams • Đắk Glei Stream • Mount Đắk Glei • The border mark of the tripoint between Vietnam - Laos - Cambodia • Bố Y Border Gate • Kon Tum wooden church • Bishop of Kon Tum Building • Hotel Đồi Thông • Mountain Măng Đen • Đắk Bla River

- Seal

- Location of Kon Tum within Vietnam
- Coordinates: 14°45′N 107°55′E
- Country: Vietnam
- Region: Central Highlands
- Capital: Kon Tum

Area
  - Total: 9,677.30 km^{2} (3,736.43 sq mi)

Population (2025)
  - Total: 729,267
  - Density: 75.3585/km^{2} (195.178/sq mi)

Demographics
  - Ethnicities: Vietnamese, Xơ Đăng, Ba Na, Giẻ Triêng, Jarai

GDP
  - Province: VND 20.057 trillion US$ 0.871 billion
- Time zone: UTC+7 (ICT)
- Calling code: 60
- ISO 3166 code: VN-28
- HDI (2020): ▲0.658 (59th)
- Website: www.kontum.gov.vn

Kon Tum is a former province in the Central Highlands region, the Central of Vietnam. It borders Quảng Nam to the north, Gia Lai to the south, Quảng Ngãi to the east, Sekong, Attapeu of Laos and Ratanakiri of Cambodia in the west.

Kon Tum shares borders with Laos and Cambodia. It has an area of 9,677.30 km^{2} (3,736.43 mi^{2}) and a population of approximately 530,000. The economy is primarily agricultural.

On June 12, 2025, Kon Tum was incorporated into Quảng Ngãi province.

== History ==
The name Kontum comes from the name of a village of the Bahnar ethnic group. In the Bahnar language, kon means "village" and tum means "pool".

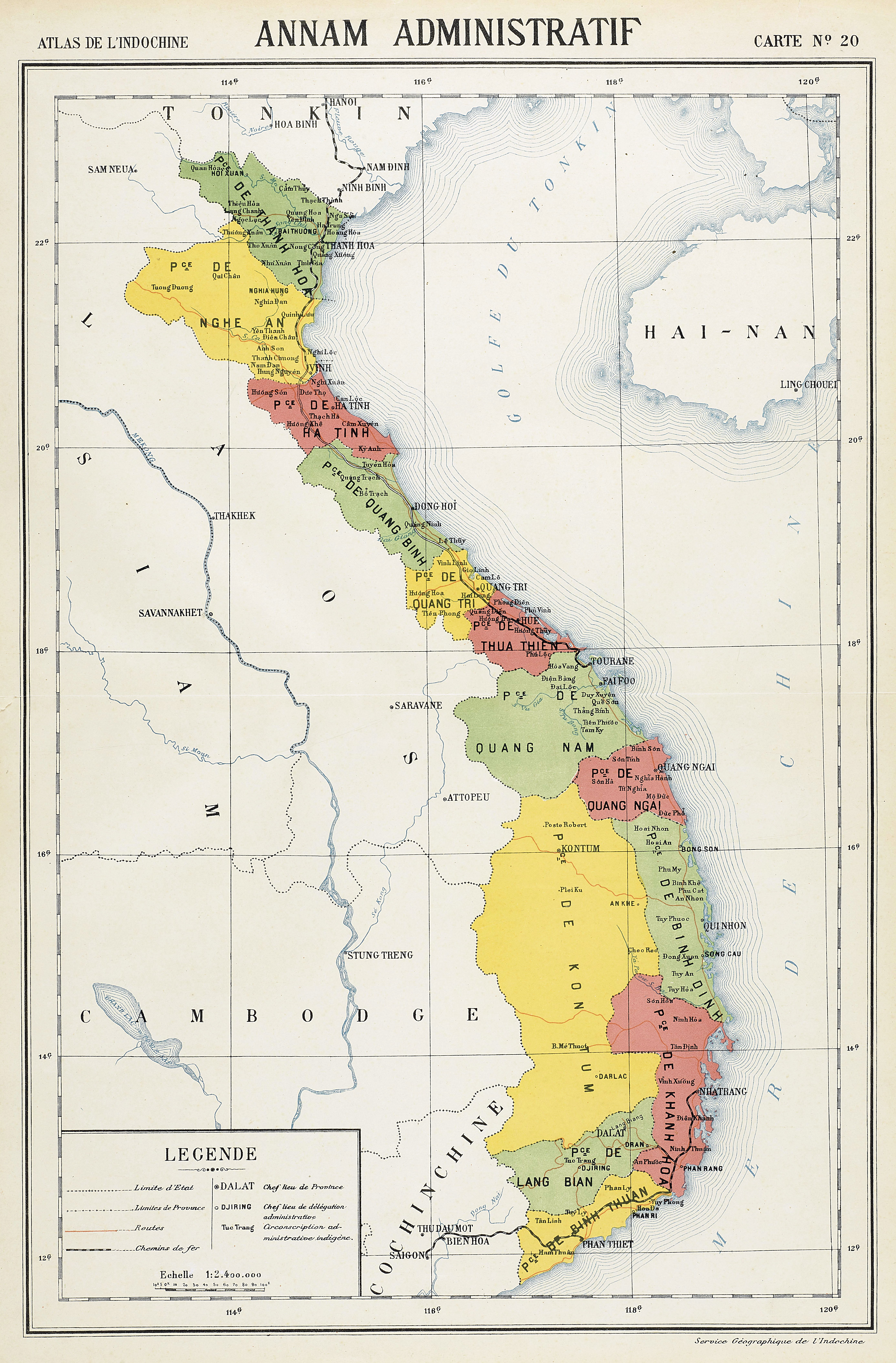
Administrative divisions of Annam 1920

During the reign of King Tự Đức (1847 - 1883), Kontum and the mountainous regions west of Quảng Nam - Quảng Ngãi - Bình Định fell under the jurisdiction of Trấn Sơn Phòng (Protectorate of Mountainous Defense) of governor Nguyễn Tấn.

By 1907, the French established Kontum province within the Protectorate of Annam, encompassing the territories of Pleiku and Darlac. In 1923, Darlac was separated from Kontum, then in 1929, in turn of Pleiku.

In April 1950, Kontum and other provinces in the Central Highlands were transferred to the Domain of the Crown under the State of Vietnam.

== Administrative divisions ==
Kon Tum is subdivided into ten district-level sub-divisions:

Second Tier subdivisions	Area (km^{2})	Third Tier subdivisions		
Second Tier subdivisions	Area (km^{2})	Wards	Townships	Communes
Kon Tum city	432.98	10		11
Đắk Glei District	1495.26		1	11
Đắk Hà District	844.47		1	10
Đắk Tô District	509.24		1	8
Ia H'Drai District	980.13			3
Kon Plông District	1381.20			9
Kon Rẫy District	886.60		1	6
Ngọc Hồi District	824.00		1	7
Sa Thầy District	1435.22		1	10
Tu Mơ Rông District	857.18			11

They are further subdivided into six commune-level towns (or townlets), 83 communes, and 10 wards.

== Geography ==
The capital city is Kon Tum, located on the Đăk Bla River.

The southern border with Gia Lai follows the Sê San river up to Yali Falls Dam, as well as part of the Dak Bla, Dak Pokei and Dak Poe rivers. The Sa Thầy River, a tributary of the Sê San, also runs through the province.

The province is primarily located in the Sê San river basin, though parts are also in the headwaters of the Vu Gia, Trà Khúc and Sekong rivers.

== Demographics ==
Ethnic groups in Kon Tum province include the Viet, Bahnar, Brau, Giẻ Triêng, Jarai, Rơ Măm, and Xo Dang.

== Notable residents ==
- Siu Black, singer

== See also ==
- Battle of Đắk Tô
