= Xo Dang people =

Xo Dang
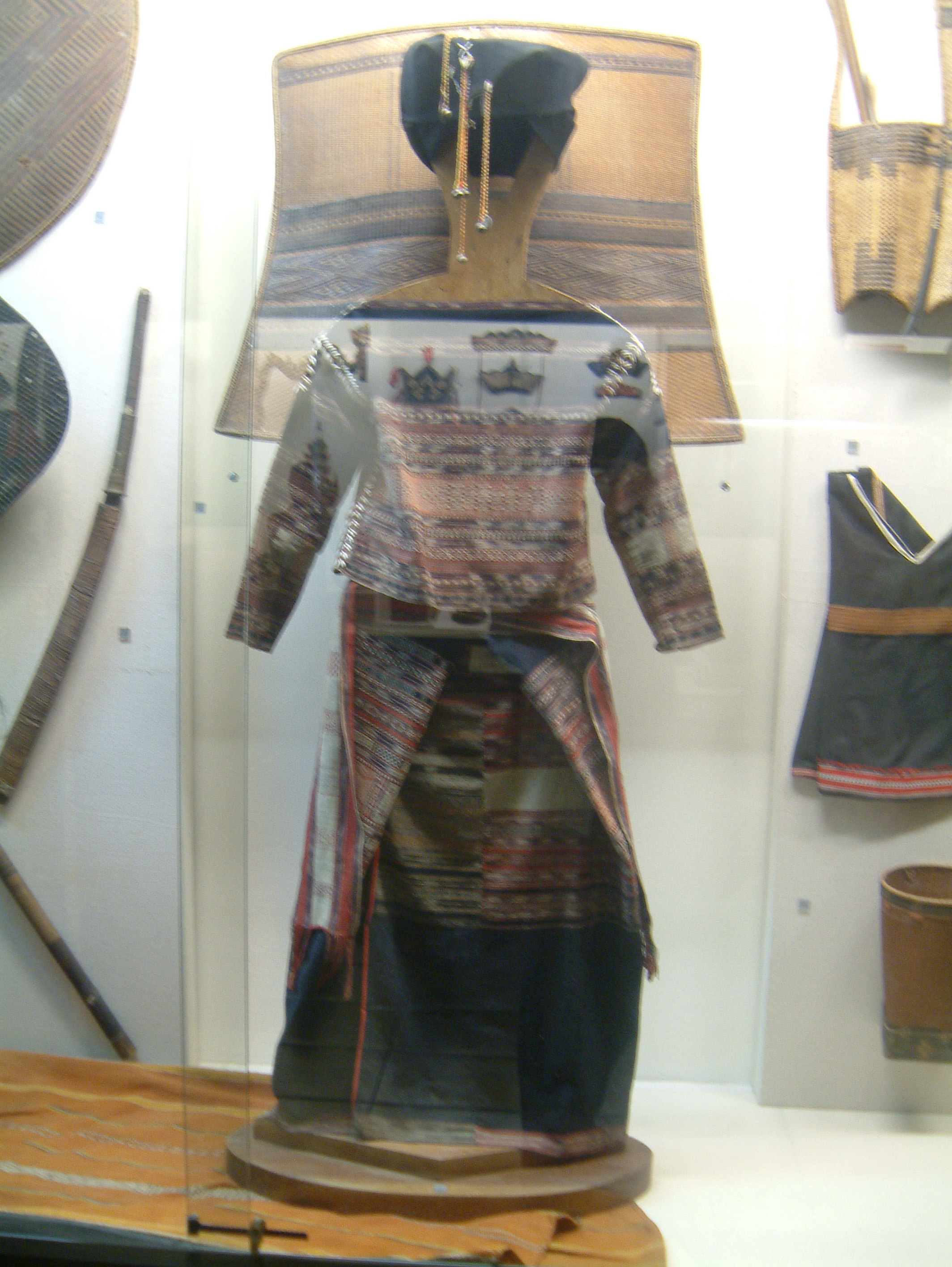
- Traditional clothing of Xo Dang people

Regions with significant populations
- Vietnam 212,277 (2019)

Languages
- Sedang • Vietnamese

Religion
- Animism • Christianity

Related ethnic groups
- Bahnar

The Sedang people (In Vietnamese: Xê Đăng or Xơ Đăng) are an ethnic group of Vietnam. They mainly inhabit the Kon Tum province, Quảng Nam province (Trà My and Phước Sơn districts), Quảng Ngãi province (Sơn Tây district). They are made up of five main groups: Xteng (Xơ Teng), Kayong, Halang (Hà Lăng), Monom and Todrah.

Religiously, they are largely animistic and Roman Catholic. Their language is part of North Bahnaric - a branch of the Mon–Khmer language family.

Halang are mixed-blood of Sedang and Jarai, influenced by Laos people. Nowadays, a small group of Halang live in Laos. Rongao (Rengao) are another mixed-blood of Sedang and Bahnar, but was categorized as a sub-group of Bahnar.

== History ==
The myth of ethnic origin shows that these North Bahnaric groups are close to the Hmong–Mien inhabitants and some Sino–Tibetan groups, suggesting that their ancestors may too have been from the far north. The closeness of their language and culture to the ancient Vietic people's ones provides more evidence. It is possible that the Chams ancestors separated them from the Vietic ancestors, then the internal conflicts of the Mon–Khmer residents, the conflicts with the Cham people, Lao people, Siamese people from 12th century to 19th century, has narrowed their range of residence. Nowadays, they no longer remember the stories of the long migrations and they have attached their legends to some locations in northern Central Highlands.

Elite warriors, war horses, war elephants and logistics from Sedang tribes alongside Bahnar, Jarai and H're tribes kept an important role in the victories of Tây Sơn dynasty at the end of the 18th century.

People used to consider the Sedang was one of the most combative races in the Central Highlands. During the French colonial period, Sedang were famous for their stubbornness, it took the French several years of hardship to conquer them.

Flag of Kingdom of Sedang

In 1888, Marie-Charles David de Mayréna, a French adventurer - under the sponsor of the French government and the Kontum missionary association - persuaded some tribal chiefs of Sedang to form the Kingdom of Sedang with Mayréna as the King (self-proclaimed). After a failed fundraising campaign, the king was deposed by the French colonial authorities in 1889. The kingdom also ended with Mayréna's death in 1890.

== Economic Activities ==
Monom group practices farming in a primitive way: tilling the land by driving buffalo herds to stomp then using wood or iron hoes to excavate. In the other groups, slash-and-burn agriculture play a dominant role, with tools and farming methods similar to other ethnic groups in the area: cutting trees with axes and knives, then burning with fire; using a sharpened stick or a stick with an iron blade to poke holes to sow seeds; weeding with a small hoe with a handle taken from a fork and a scraper with a bent blade to one side; harvesting the rice by hand.

Sedang's traditional livestock are water buffalo, goat, highland black pig, dog, and chicken. Kayong group has planted cinnamon trees. Blacksmithing has been developing in Todrah group area, they knew how to make iron from ore to forge metalwork.

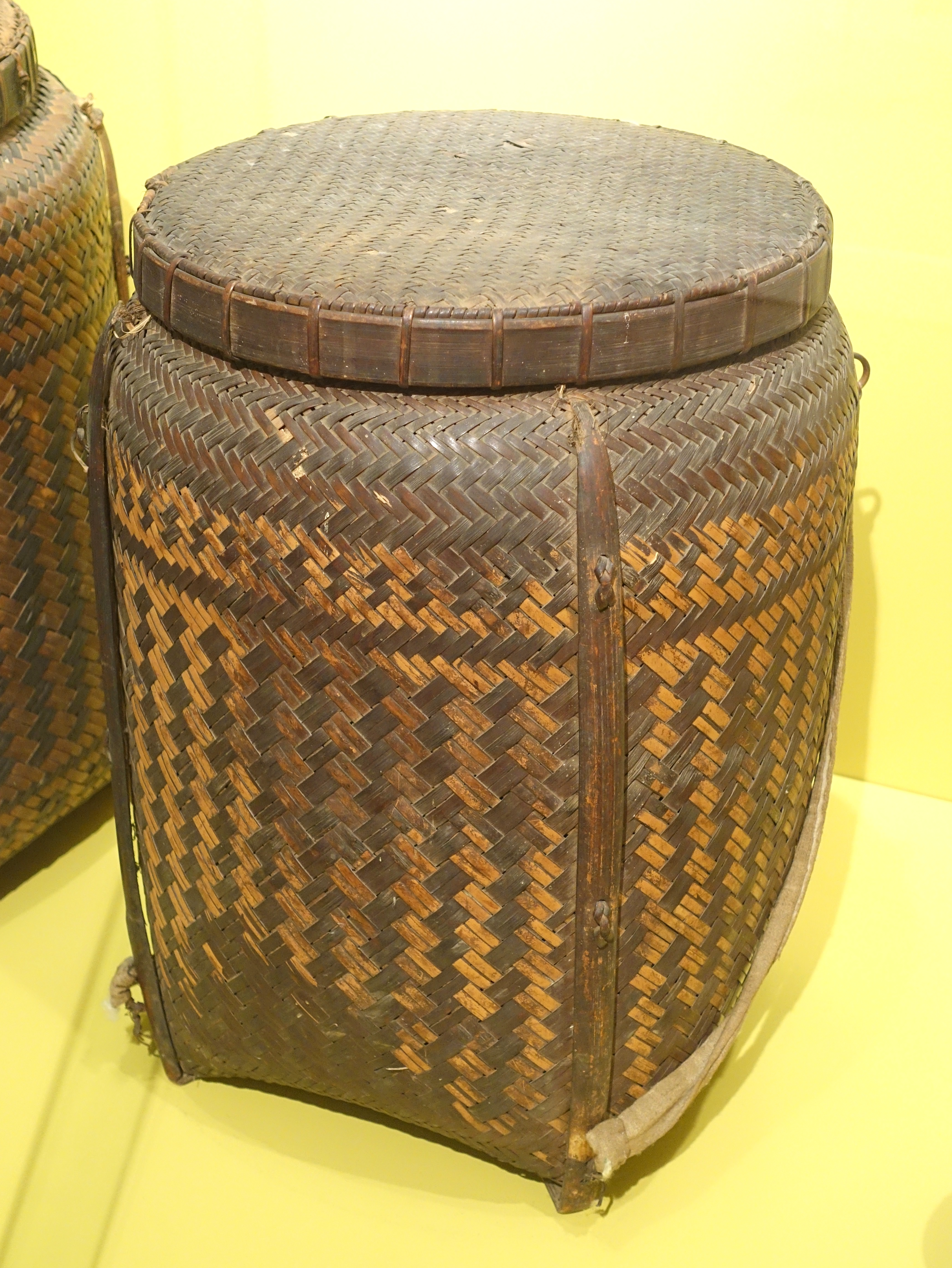
Grain basket of Xo-dang people in Kon Tum province

Except a part of the Kayong group, other Sedang groups all know how to weave. In the past, the people only weaved with jute, wild or garden grown ramie. Currently, the Monom and Xteng groups still maintain that tradition. The Todrah and Halang groups have grown cotton plant for spinning and weaving.

== Culture ==
Sedang people live in small rectangle-shaped stilt houses with thatched roofs, the upper story is for people, the lower story for livestock and wood storage.

The traditional folk festivals of Sedang people are held following the production cycle. Around the beginning of July, they hold the Ondrô Lo Chôi festival to sow seeds into the upland field and/or sow young rice plants into the patty field. When the rice plants has turned green, the Tra Ke Ton festival will be held for eating leftover rice seeds at the beginning of August.

== Notable people ==
- A Núk (1936–2016), Việt Cộng sapper of Gia Lai Province Command, who used 8 explosive charges to destroy 16 U.S. aircraft in the Attack on Camp Holloway. He was awarded the Hero of the People's Armed Forces on September 19, 1967.
- Y Buông (born 1945), cook who served on the Đắk Tô battlefield. She was awarded the Hero of the People's Armed Forces in 1972 and became a member of the 6th National Assembly from 1976 to 1981.
- Hổ (born 1998), footballer.

== See also ==
- List of ethnic groups in Vietnam
