= Ngọc Hồi district =

Coordinates: 14.750°N 107.583°E

Ngọc Hồi district Huyện Ngọc Hồi
- District
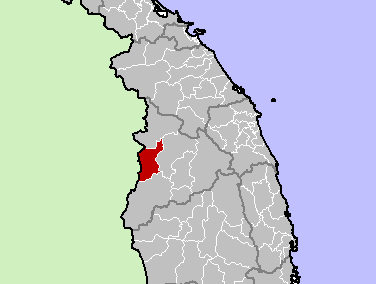
- Location in Kon Tum province
- Country: Vietnam
- Province: Kon Tom
- Capital: Plei Kần

Area
  - Total: 318 sq mi (824 km^{2})

Population (2018)
  - Total: 41,828
- Time zone: UTC+7 (Indochina Time)

Ngọc Hồi is a former rural district (huyện) of Kon Tum province, in the Central Highlands region of Vietnam. As of 2003 the district had a population of 30,392. The district covers an area of 824 km². The district capital lies at Plei Kần.
