= Tu Mơ Rông district =

Tu Mơ Rông district Huyện Tu Mơ Rông
- District
- Interactive map of Tu Mơ Rông district
- Country: Vietnam
- Province: Kon Tum province

Area
  - Total: 332.7 sq mi (861.7 km^{2})

Population (2004)
  - Total: 25,500
- Time zone: UTC+7 (Indochina Time)

Tu Mo Rong (Vietnamese: Tu Mơ Rông) is a former district (huyện) of Kon Tum province in the Central Highlands region of Vietnam.
