= Đăk Bla River =

Đăk Bla River Krông B'Lah
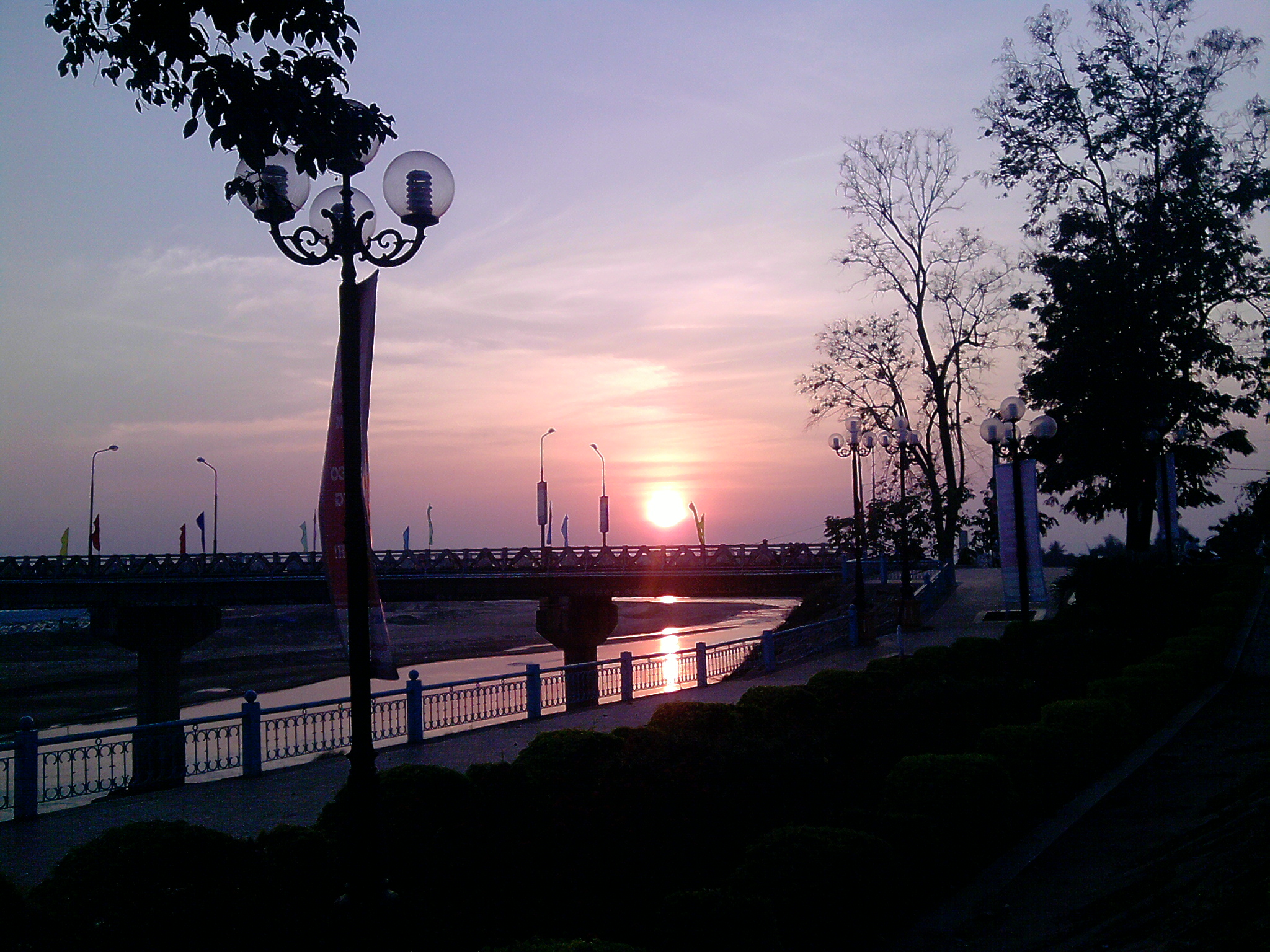
- Đăk Bla Bridge, south of Kon Tum city
- Native name: Sông Đăk Bla (Vietnamese)

Location
- Country: Vietnam

Physical characteristics
- Mouth
  - coordinates: 14°21′57″N 107°52′47″E
- Length: 157 km (98 mi)
- Basin size: 3,436 km^{2} (1,327 sq mi)

Basin features
- Progression: Đăk Bla—Tonlé San—Mekong—Mekong Delta—South China Sea

The Đăk Bla River (or Krông B'Lah) is a river in Vietnam. It flows through the Kon Tum and Gia Lai provinces and is a main tributary of the Se San River.

The river has a length of 157 km and a basin area of 3,436 km.

In the Ia Grai district of Gia Lai province, it merges with the Ia Grai River to form the Se San River.
