= K'Bang =

Kbang Xã Kbang
- Commune
- Kbang commune
- Location within Vietnam
- Coordinates: 14°08′38″N 108°36′08″E
- Country: Vietnam
- Region: Central Highlands
- Province: Gia Lai
- Time zone: UTC+7 (UTC + 7)

Kbang is a commune (xã) of Gia Lai Province, Vietnam.
