= Đăk Tô district =

Đăk Tô district Huyện Đăk Tô
- District
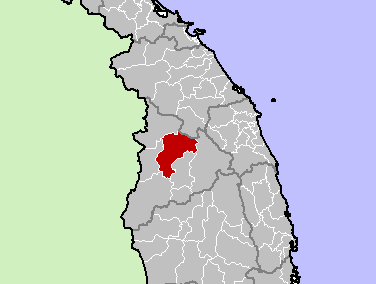
- Location in Kon Tum province

- Location of in Vietnam
- Coordinates: 14°42′N 107°51′E
- Country: Vietnam
- Province: Kon Tum

Area
  - Total: 509.24 km^{2} (196.62 sq mi)

Population (2018)
  - Total: 38,642

Đăk Tô is a rural district of Kon Tum province in Central Highlands region of Vietnam.

As of 2018, the district had a population of 38,642. The district covers an area of 509.24 km². The district capital lies at Đăk Tô.

== Geography ==
Located just north of the Vietnamese town of Tân Cảnh (nicknamed "Tin Can" by American GIs), Đăk Tô is populated by a Montagnard tribal people known as the Degar. Đăk Tô is in a lush region of forest-covered mountains and deep valleys, with many streams.

== Climate ==
Climate data for Đăk Tô, elevation 500 m (1,600 ft)
Month	Jan	Feb	Mar	Apr	May	Jun	Jul	Aug	Sep	Oct	Nov	Dec	Year
Record high °C (°F)	33.7 (92.7)	35.5 (95.9)	37.1 (98.8)	37.9 (100.2)	35.2 (95.4)	35.2 (95.4)	34.4 (93.9)	33.2 (91.8)	32.5 (90.5)	33.0 (91.4)	32.6 (90.7)	33.2 (91.8)	37.9 (100.2)
Mean daily maximum °C (°F)	27.6 (81.7)	29.8 (85.6)	31.4 (88.5)	31.9 (89.4)	30.4 (86.7)	28.6 (83.5)	27.9 (82.2)	27.4 (81.3)	27.9 (82.2)	27.8 (82.0)	27.4 (81.3)	26.7 (80.1)	28.7 (83.7)
Daily mean °C (°F)	19.3 (66.7)	21.1 (70.0)	23.3 (73.9)	24.5 (76.1)	24.6 (76.3)	24.2 (75.6)	23.6 (74.5)	23.3 (73.9)	23.1 (73.6)	22.2 (72.0)	21.2 (70.2)	19.6 (67.3)	22.5 (72.5)
Mean daily minimum °C (°F)	13.0 (55.4)	14.6 (58.3)	17.5 (63.5)	19.9 (67.8)	21.3 (70.3)	21.6 (70.9)	21.2 (70.2)	21.1 (70.0)	20.5 (68.9)	18.8 (65.8)	16.9 (62.4)	14.5 (58.1)	18.5 (65.3)
Record low °C (°F)	3.2 (37.8)	7.2 (45.0)	5.0 (41.0)	12.9 (55.2)	15.9 (60.6)	17.3 (63.1)	17.2 (63.0)	18.0 (64.4)	13.1 (55.6)	11.5 (52.7)	7.4 (45.3)	3.6 (38.5)	3.2 (37.8)
Average precipitation mm (inches)	3.1 (0.12)	7.4 (0.29)	41.7 (1.64)	92.5 (3.64)	207.6 (8.17)	264.2 (10.40)	314.2 (12.37)	380.9 (15.00)	285.9 (11.26)	160.8 (6.33)	54.7 (2.15)	13.1 (0.52)	1,814.8 (71.45)
Average rainy days	0.7	1.6	5.3	10.5	18.2	22.5	23.6	26.8	22.8	15.7	6.6	2.0	156.2
Average relative humidity (%)	73.9	71.7	72.1	76.3	81.8	86.8	88.1	89.2	88.1	84.5	79.4	76.6	80.7
Mean monthly sunshine hours	266.4	244.7	253.5	221.5	188.1	134.7	124.9	113.7	127.4	173.7	206.2	241.8	2,290.6
Source: Vietnam Institute for Building Science and Technology

== History ==
During the Vietnam War, Đăk Tô was viewed as a strategic area because of its proximity to a major branch of the Ho Chi Minh trail, which Hanoi maintained through the neighboring country of Laos. It was the site of the Battle of Đăk Tô.

== Industry ==
It is part of the Kon Tum province industrial area.
