= Đắk Hà district =

Đăk Hà district Huyện Đăk Hà
- District
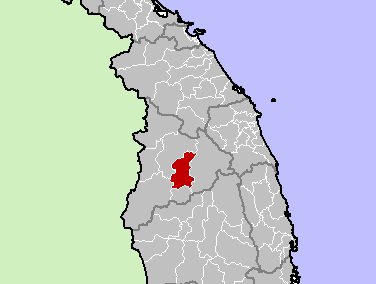
- Location in Kon Tum province
- Country: Vietnam
- Province: Kon Tum
- Capital: Đăk Hà

Area
  - Total: 326 sq mi (844 km^{2})

Population (2018)
  - Total: 61,655
- Time zone: UTC+7 (Indochina Time)

Đăk Hà is a rural district of Kon Tum province in the Central Highlands region of Vietnam.

== Divisions ==
Dak Ha contains the following communes:

- Đăk La
- Hà Mòn
- Ngọc Wang
- Ngọc Réo
- Đăk Uy
- Đăk Mar
- Đăk Hring
- Đăk Pxi

As of 2003 the district had a population of 53,684. The district covers an area of 844 km^{2}. The district capital lies at Đăk Hà.
