= Kon Rẫy district =

Kon Rẫy district Huyện Kon Rẫy
- District
- Interactive map of Kon Rẫy district
- Country: Vietnam
- Province: Kon Tum
- Capital: Đăk Rve

Area
  - Total: 344 sq mi (891 km^{2})

Population (2003)
  - Total: 22,872
- Time zone: UTC+7 (Indochina Time)

Kon Rẫy is a rural district of Kon Tum province in the Central Highlands region of Vietnam. National Road 24 passes through the district. As of 2003 the district had a population of 22,872. The district covers an area of 891 km². The district capital lies at Đăk Rve.
