= Bahnar people =

Ethnic group indigenous to Central Highlands, Vietnam

Bahnar Ba-Na
Total population
- ≈ estimated 300,000

Regions with significant populations
- Vietnam: 286,910
- United States: ≈ 10,000
- France: ≈ 5,000

Languages
- Bahnar–Rengao • Vietnamese • Haroi

Religion
- Christianity

Related ethnic groups
- Sedang, Jarai, Haroi

The Bahnar or Ba-Na (Vietnamese pronunciation: [ɓaː˧naː˧] are an ethnic group of Vietnam and the indigenous people of the Central Highland provinces of Gia Lai and Kon Tum, as well as the coastal provinces of Bình Định and Phú Yên. They speak the Bahnar language, a language in the Bahnaric language group that belongs to the Mon-Khmer (Austroasiatic) language family.

== Etymology ==
The word bahnar is similar to phnom (ភ្នំ) in the Khmer language, which means mountain. The Bahnar have many names, such as Bonom, Jolong, Rongao, Tolo, Kriem, Roh, Konkodeh, Golar, and others.

== Sub-ethnicities ==
Bahnar has several sub-ethnicities, including the following.

- Bahnar Jơlơng
- Bahnar Rơngao
- Bahnar Gơlar
- Bahnar KonKde
- Bahnar Kriem
- Bahnar Tơlô
- Bahnar Bơnâm
- Bahnar Roh

== Ethnic linkages ==
The Haroi people, who are currently considered a sub-ethnic of the Cham people, were historically said to be the Bahnar people who lived in the Champa city-states. They then slowly assimilated with other Austronesian-speaking ethnic groups such as the Cham, until they became the Cham people and adopted the Cham language and culture which had quite a high Austroasiatic influence.

== Religion ==
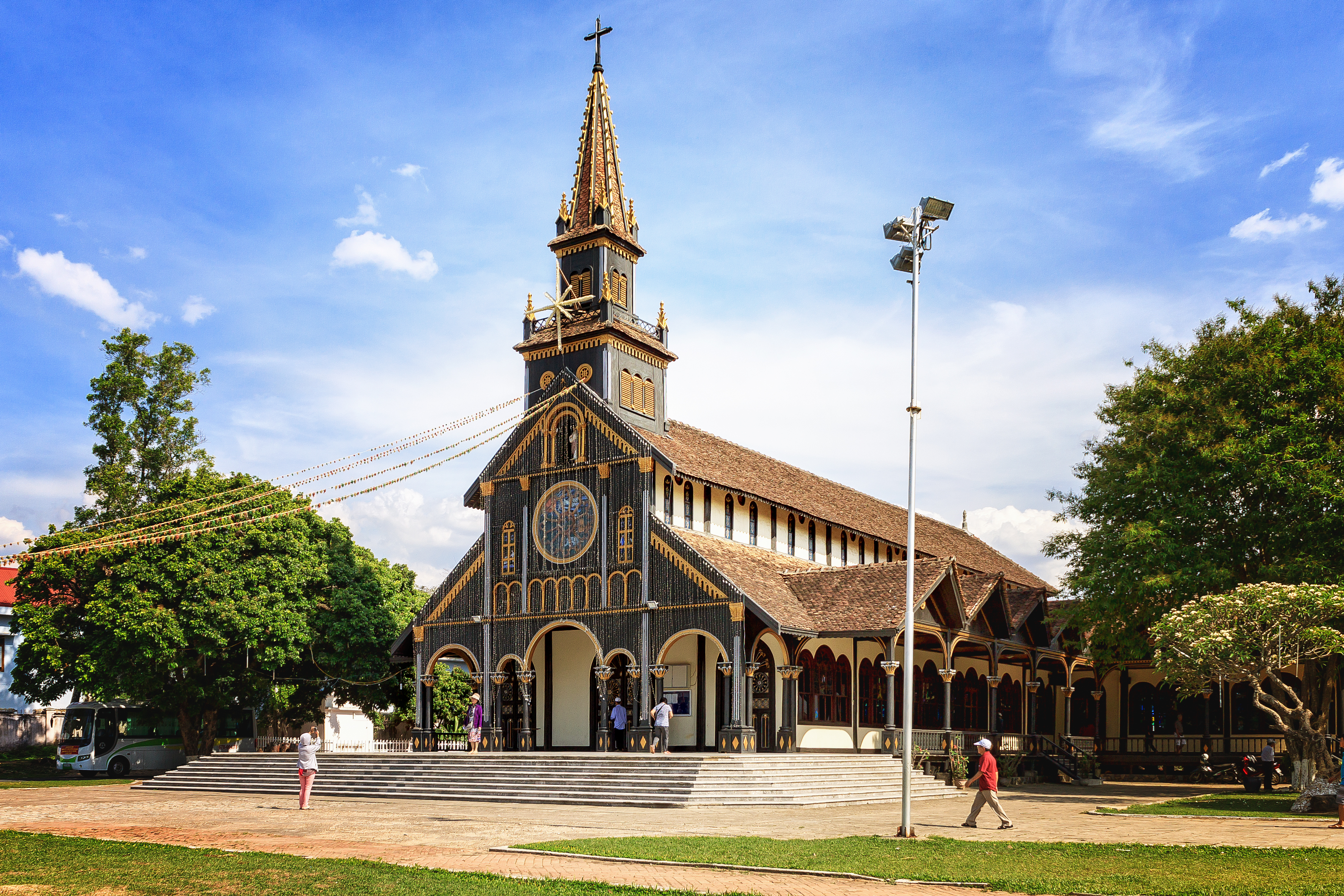
Bahnar Cathedral in Kon Tum province.

The Bahnar people are followers of traditional religions (animism and polytheism). However, there is a large Christian population among them, just like other central highlands ethnic groups (Montagnards) where they experience discrimination because of their religion.

== Culture ==
=== Arts ===
Epics (Bahnar: H'amon) such as Dam Noi represent centuries-old aspirations of Bahnar people.

Like many of the other ethnic groups of Vietnam's Central Highlands, the Bahnar play a great number of traditional musical instruments, including ensembles of pitched gongs and string instruments made from bamboo. These instruments are sometimes played in concert for special occasions, which may also involve ceremonial rượu cần (rice wine) drinking and group dancing.

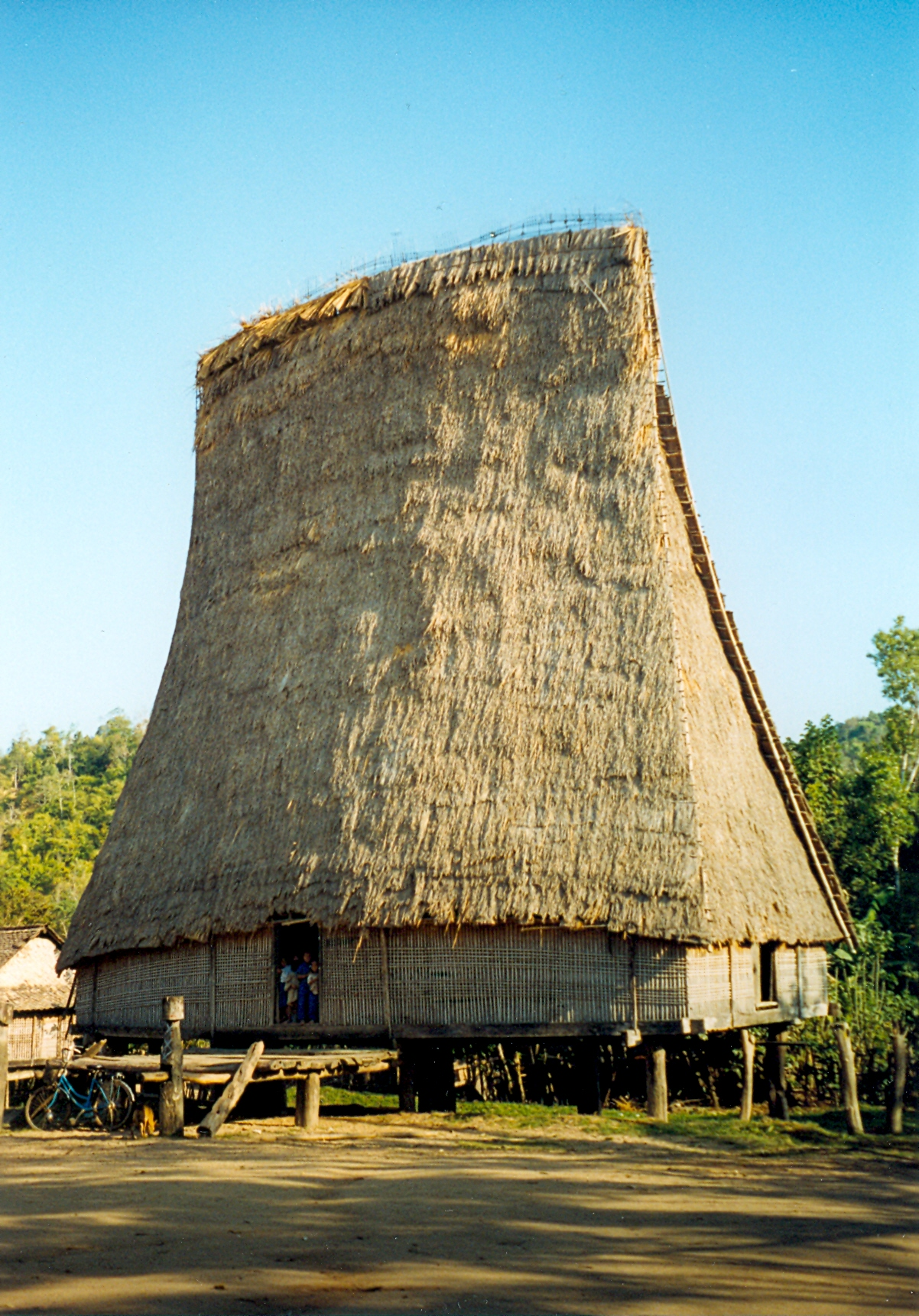
A Bahnar rong (communal house) in the Kon Kotu village.

=== Festivals ===
- Koh Kpo (or Groong Kpo Tonơi): a festival to express gratitude toward Yang (the god) with the main activity being the stabbing of a water buffalo. A possible Chamic reconstruction of this name would be Gleng Ka Ppo Tanguei 'Dedication to the God of the Corn'. Contemporary Bahnar refer to this ceremony as the even more truncated 'Gong Kpo'.

== Notable people ==
- Dinh Nup, a hero who led villagers to carry out a war of resistance against the French colonial regime. He became the main character of a famous novel titled Đất nước đứng lên (A Rising Nation), written by Nguyên Ngọc.
- Ya Do, a heroine, the wife of Nguyễn Nhạc
- Siu Black, popular singer

== See also ==
- Bahnar language
- Bahnaric languages
- Haroi people
- Champa
- Degar
- Tây Nguyên
- FULRO

== Bibliography ==
- Bùi Minh Đạo. 2011. The Bahnar people in Viet Nam. Hanoi: World Publishers. ISBN 978-604-77-0319-7
- Đào Huy Quyền. 1998. Nhạc khí dân tộc Jrai và Bahnar [Musical instruments of the Jrai and Bahnar]. Hanoi: Nhà xuất bản trẻ.
