= Gia Lai province =

Province of Vietnam

Gia Lai
- Province
- Tỉnh Gia Lai 省嘉萊
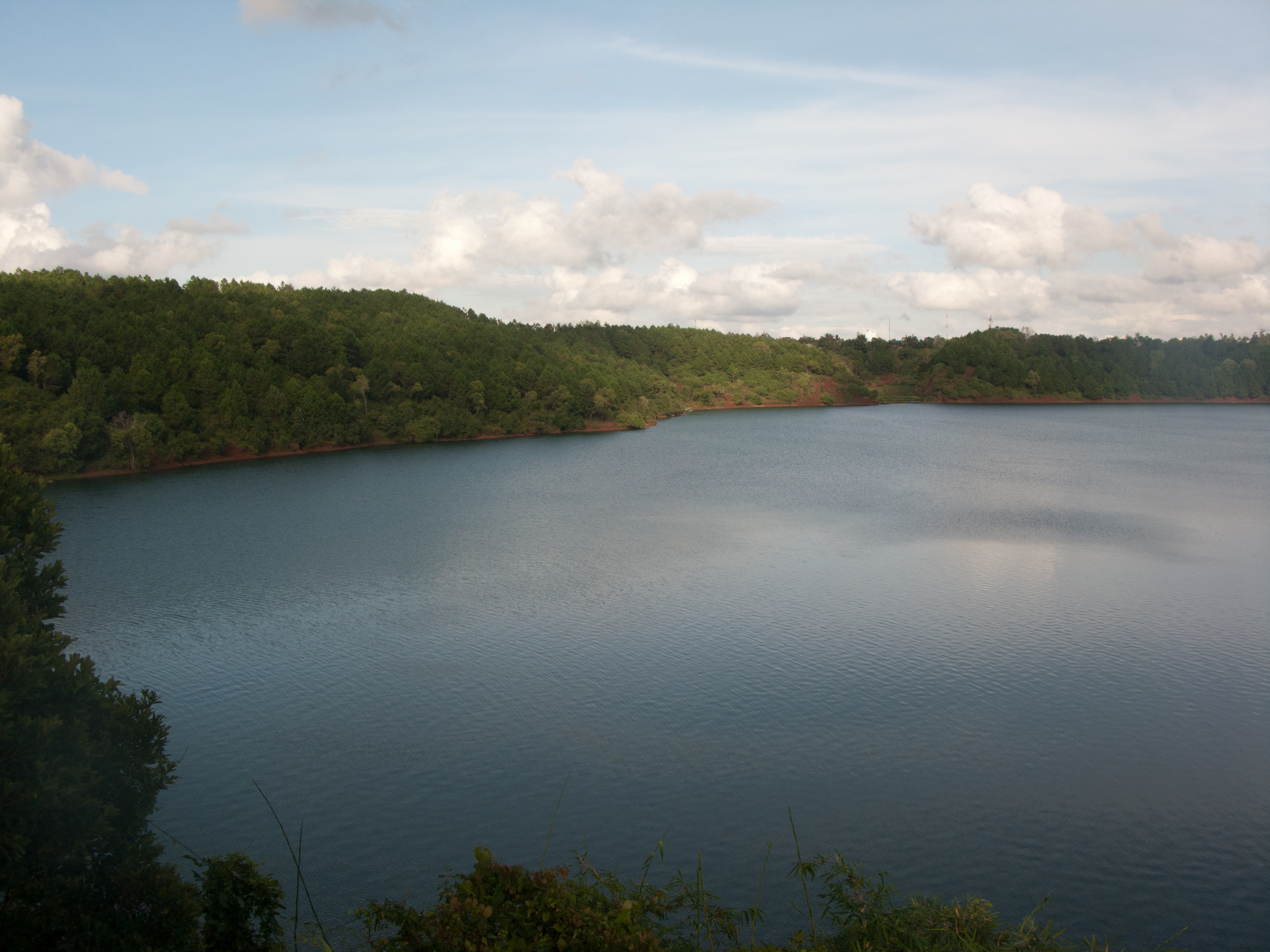
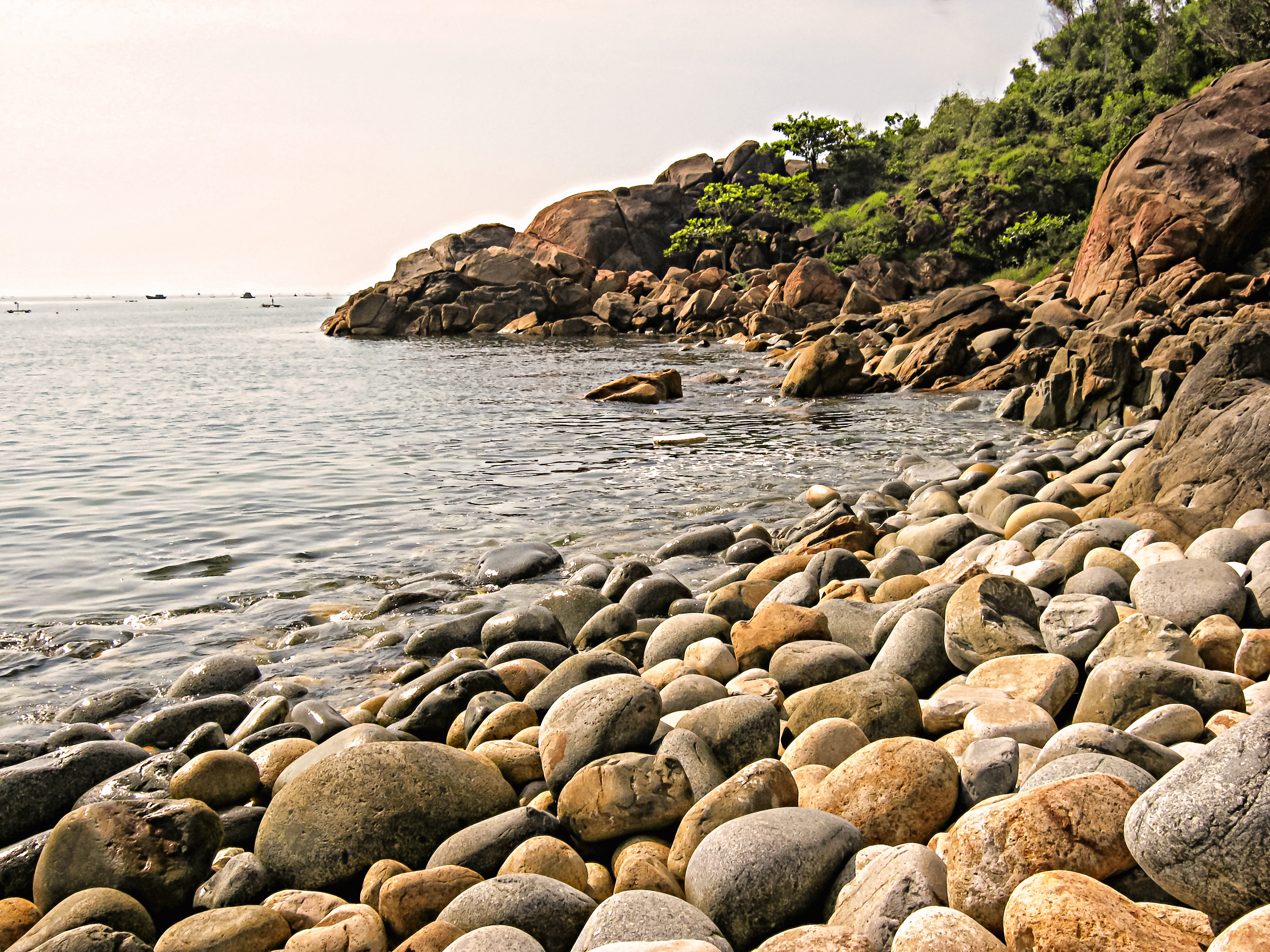
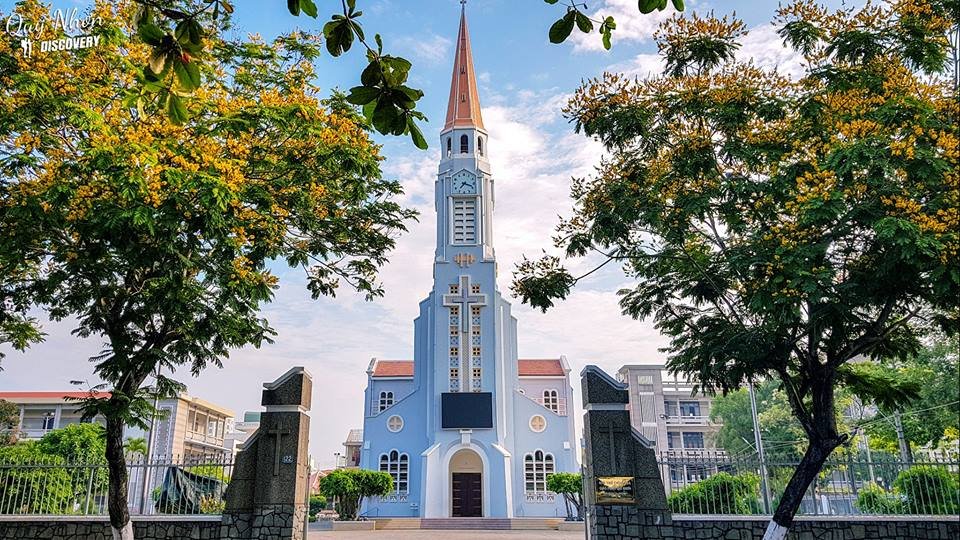
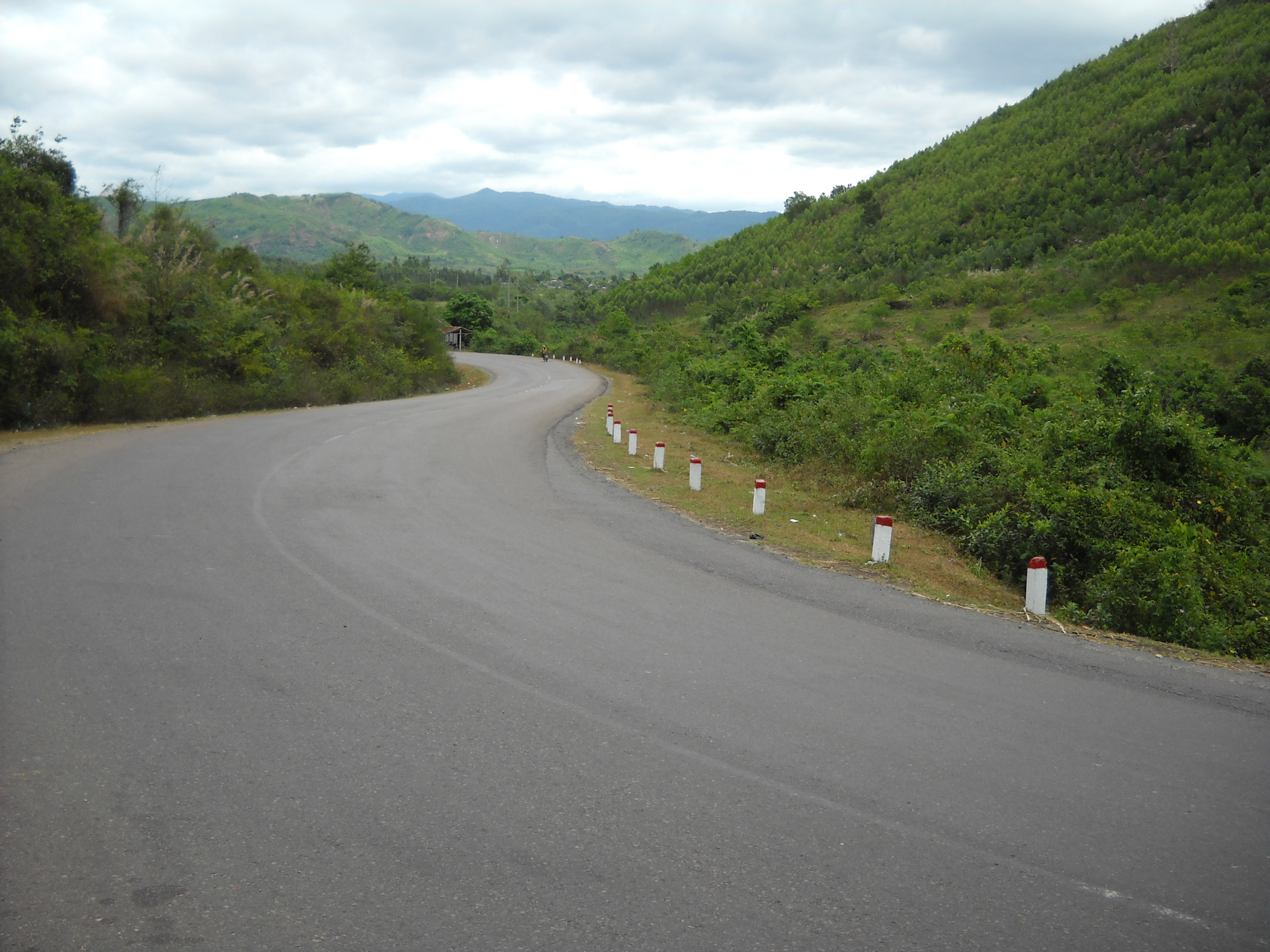
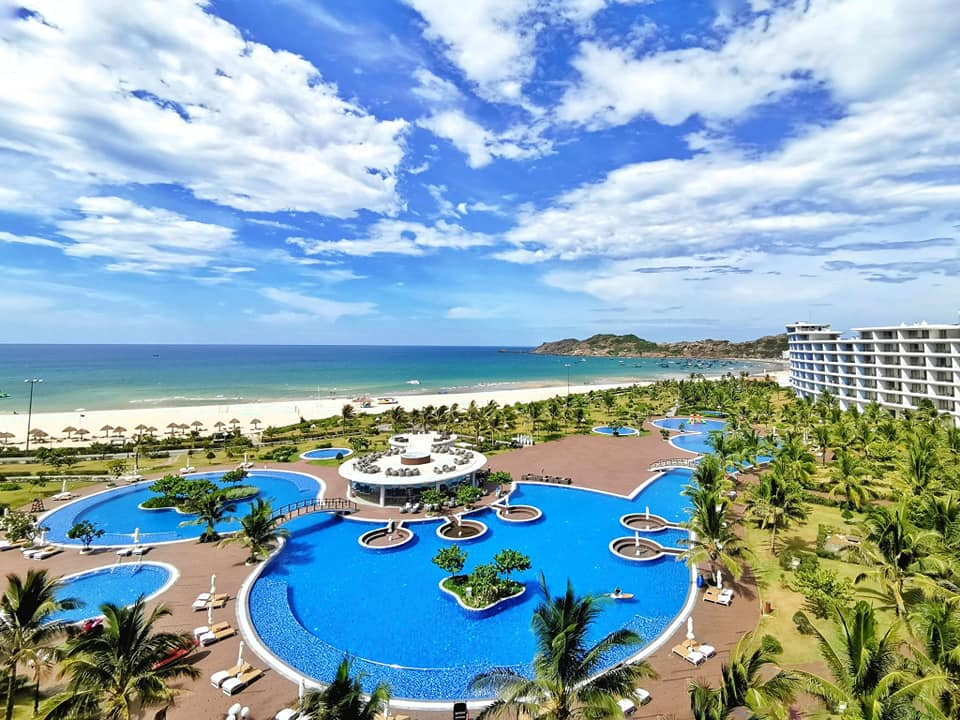
- Clockwise from top left: Pleiku Lake; Ghềnh Ráng Beach; An Khê Pass; FLC Quy Nhơn Resort; Coastline of Ky Co Beach; Quy Nhon Cathedral

- Location in Vietnam
- Interactive map of Gia Lai
- Coordinates: 13°45′N 108°15′E
- Country: Vietnam
- Region: South Central Coast and Central Highlands
- Capital: Quy Nhơn ward

Government
  - People's Council Chair: Dương Văn Trang
  - People's Committee Chair: Phạm Thế Dũng

Area
  - Total: 21,576.53 km^{2} (8,330.74 sq mi)

Population (2025)
  - Total: 3,583,693
  - Density: 166.0922/km^{2} (430.1768/sq mi)

Demographics
  - Ethnicities: 39, including Kinh, Yagrai, Bahnar, M'nam, Jeh-Tariang

GDP
  - Total: VND 66.158 trillion US$ 2.873 billion
- Time zone: UTC+7 (ICT)
- Area codes: 269 (from 17 Jun 2017); 59 (until 16 Jul 2017)
- ISO 3166 code: VN-30
- HDI (2020): ▲0.663 (56th)

Gia Lai (from the word Jarai) is the second-largest province of Vietnam, located in the South Central Coast and Central Highlands. It has at an average altitude of 700–800 m (2,300–2,600 ft) above sea level, with an area of 21,576.53 km^{2} (8,331 sq mi). It borders Đắk Lắk in the south, Quảng Ngãi in the north, East Sea to the east and Ratanakiri of Cambodia in the west.

As of 2025, Gia Lai province is the 18th most populous administrative unit in Vietnam with a population of 4,182,700 people.

Under Resolution 202/2025/QH15, a restructuring took place in 2025, with the former Gia Lai and Bình Định provinces officially merged into one single administrative unit. The unified province retained the name Gia Lai. This merger created Vietnam's second-largest province, covering over 21,576 km^{2} with a population exceeding 3.5 million people. The administrative center is located in Quy Nhơn (the former capital of Bình Định), while Pleiku remains a cultural and economic hub.
