= Central Highlands (Vietnam) =

Geocultural subregion of Vietnam

Coordinates: 13°45′N 108°15′E

Central Highlands Cao nguyên Nam Trung Bộ Tây Nguyên
- Location of the Central Highlands in Vietnam
- Country: Vietnam

Area
  - Total: 54,548.31 km^{2} (21,061.22 sq mi)

Population (2022)
  - Total: 6,092,420
  - Density: 111.689/km^{2} (289.272/sq mi)

GDP
  - Total: VND 273 trillion US$ 12.0 billion (2021)
- Time zone: UTC+7 (UTC +7)
- HDI (2022): 0.685 high · 4th

The Central Highlands (Vietnamese: Cao nguyên Trung Phần, or Cao nguyên Trung Bộ), South Central Highlands (Vietnamese: Cao nguyên Nam Trung Bộ), or Western Highlands (Vietnamese: Tây Nguyên), is a geocultural subregion located in Vietnam's South Central region.

The subregion contains parts of provinces: Đắk Lắk, Gia Lai, Quảng Ngãi, and Lâm Đồng, and prior to 2025 consisted of provinces Đắk Nông, Lâm Đồng, Đắk Lắk, Gia Lai, and Kon Tum.

== Geography ==
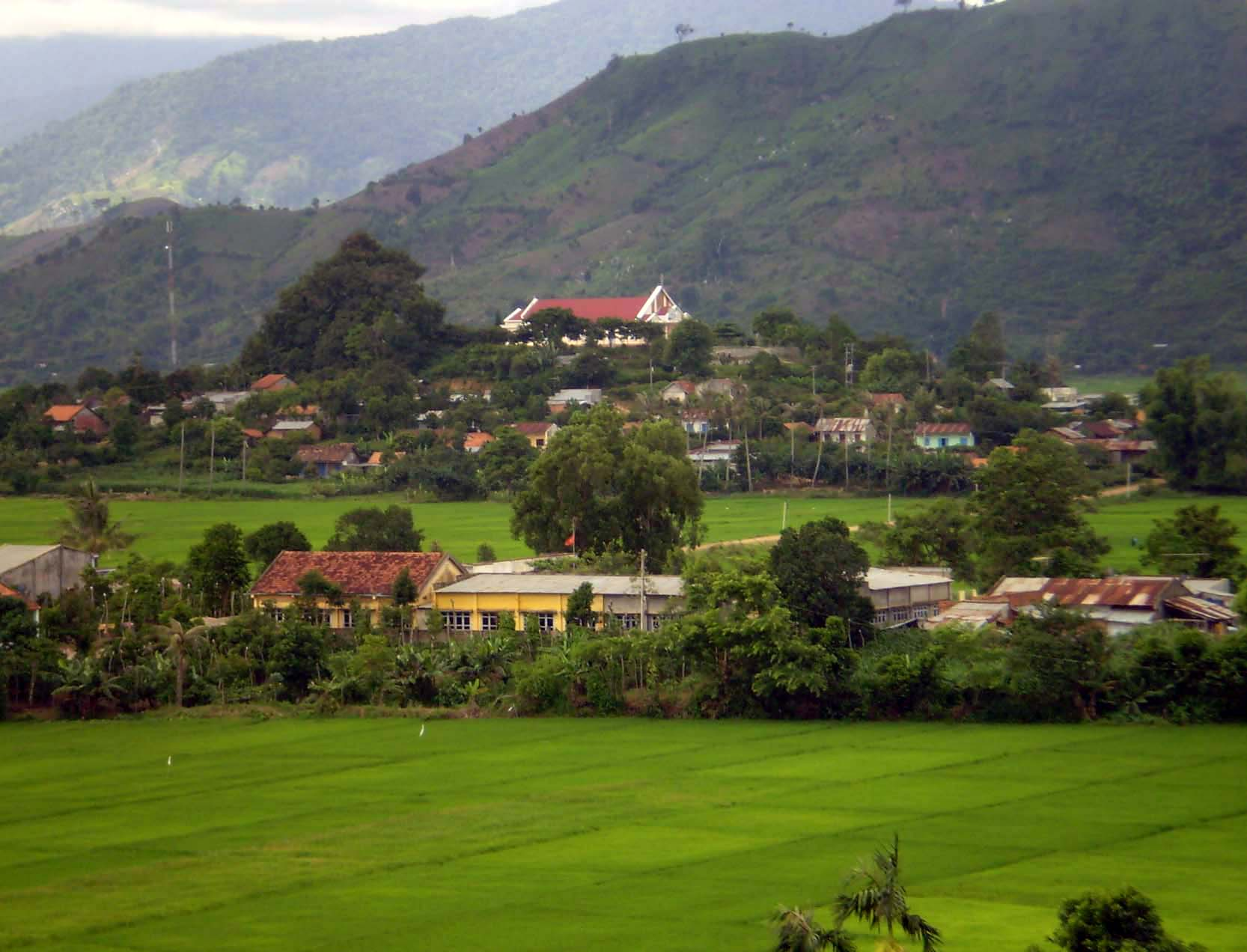
Dong Son village in Đắk Lắk Province, surrounded by mountains.

The Central Highlands are a series of plateaus bordering the lower part of Laos and northeastern Cambodia, namely Kon Tum Plateau at 500 m, Kon Plông Plateau, Kon Hà Nừng Plateau, Pleiku Plateau at 800 m, Mdrak Plateau at approximately 500 m, Đắk Lắk Plateau at around 800 m, Mơ Nông Plateau with the height of about 800–1000 m, Lâm Viên Plateau of approximately 1500 m and Di Linh Plateau of about 900–1000 m. All of these plateaus are situated south of the Annamite Range.

The Central Highlands are mostly drained by tributaries of the Mekong. The Sesan or Tonlé San river drains the northern portion of the highlands, and the Srepok River the southern. A series of shorter rivers run from the eastern edge of the highlands to the Vietnamese coast.

Tây Nguyên can be divided into three subregions according to their deviation in topography and climate, namely: North Tây Nguyên (Bắc Tây Nguyên) (inclusive of Kon Tum and Gia Lai provinces), Middle Tây Nguyên (Trung Tây Nguyên) (covering provinces of Đắk Lắk and Đắk Nông), South Tây Nguyên (Nam Tây Nguyên) (Lâm Đồng). Trung Tây Nguyên has a lower altitude and therefore has a higher temperature than the other two subregions.

== Provinces ==
- Đắk Lắk
- Gia Lai
- Lâm Đồng (before were Lâm Đồng and Đắk Nông)
- Quảng Ngãi (before was Kon Tum)

== History ==
The native inhabitants of the Central Highlands, known as the Montagnards (Mountain peoples), are various peoples that mainly belonged to the two major Austroasiatic (Bahnaric) and Austronesian (Highland Chamic) ethnolinguistic families. According to Peng et al. (2010) & Liu et al. (2020), Austronesian Chamic groups were well known of being seafarers with the original homeland of Taiwan, might have migrated to present-day Central Vietnam by sea from Maritime Southeast Asia around ~ 2,500 kya, while were making contact/or possibly absorbed the previously earlier Austroasiatic inhabitants (research shows shared high frequencies of AA-associated ancestry among Vietnam's Austronesian Chamic highlanders than Austronesian Chamic lowlanders which are more related with Taiwanese AN groups).

Throughout pre-modern history, the Central Highlands were not under the control of surrounding lowland classical kingdoms, thus much of prehistoric indigenous cultures were preserved. Highlands and mountains acted like barricades that curtailed much of the lowland influences on the Central Highlands people. The region falls into the geographical category described by James C. Scott as terra zomia, a huge mountainous landmass of Mainland Southeast Asia (including Southern China and Northeast India).

During the early fifteenth century, the northern part of Central Highlands (around present-day An Khê) had a dubious ruler named Śrī Gajarāja (King of the Elephants) with the title "The great king of the Montagnards of Madhyamagrāma" ("big village"), who was a vassal of Cham king Indravarman VI (r. 1400–1441) in the lowland. Despite geographic barriers, the Cham extensively used the Highlands as their resources backyard to provide medieval commodities. They also built several temples in the Highlands, for example, the temple of Yang Prong (in Đắk Lắk province) constructed by king Simhavarman III (r. 1288–1307). It is evident that Chamic-speaking peoples of the lowlands had engaged direct contacts and trade with the peoples of the Central Highlands for a long time before Kinh Vietnamese colonialism, resulting in mutual linguistic borrowings in both colloquial languages and cultural similarities.

Ethnic Vietnamese (Kinh) people arrived in the Central Highlands after France annexed the area into Vietnam in 1889. The Vietnamese now outnumber the indigenous Degars after state-sponsored settlement directed by both the government of the Republic of Vietnam and the current Communist government of the Socialist Republic of Vietnam. The Montagnards have fought against and resisted all Vietnamese settlers, from the anti-Communist South Vietnamese government, the Viet Cong, to the Communist government of unified Vietnam.

The Champa state and Chams in the lowlands were traditional suzerains whom the Montagnards in the highlands acknowledged as their lords, while autonomy was held by the Montagnards. After 1945, concept of "Nam tiến" and the southward expansion was celebrated by Vietnamese scholars. The Pays Montagnard du Sud-Indochinois was the name of the Central Highlands from 1946 under French Indochina.

Up until French rule, the Central Highlands was almost never entered by the Vietnamese since they viewed it as a savage (Moi) populated area with fierce animals like tigers, "poisoned water" and "evil malevolent spirits". The Vietnamese expressed interest in the land after the French transformed it into a profitable plantation area to grow crops on, in addition to the natural resources from the forests, minerals and rich earth and realization of its crucial geographical importance.

An insurgency was waged by Montagnards in FULRO against South Vietnam and then unified Communist Vietnam. A settlement program of ethnic Kinh Vietnamese by the government of the Republic of Vietnam was implemented and now a Kinh majority predominates in the highland areas. After mass demonstrations and protests during 2001 and 2004 by ethnic hill tribe minorities against the communist government, foreigners were banned from the Central Highlands for a period of time.

== Ethnic groups ==
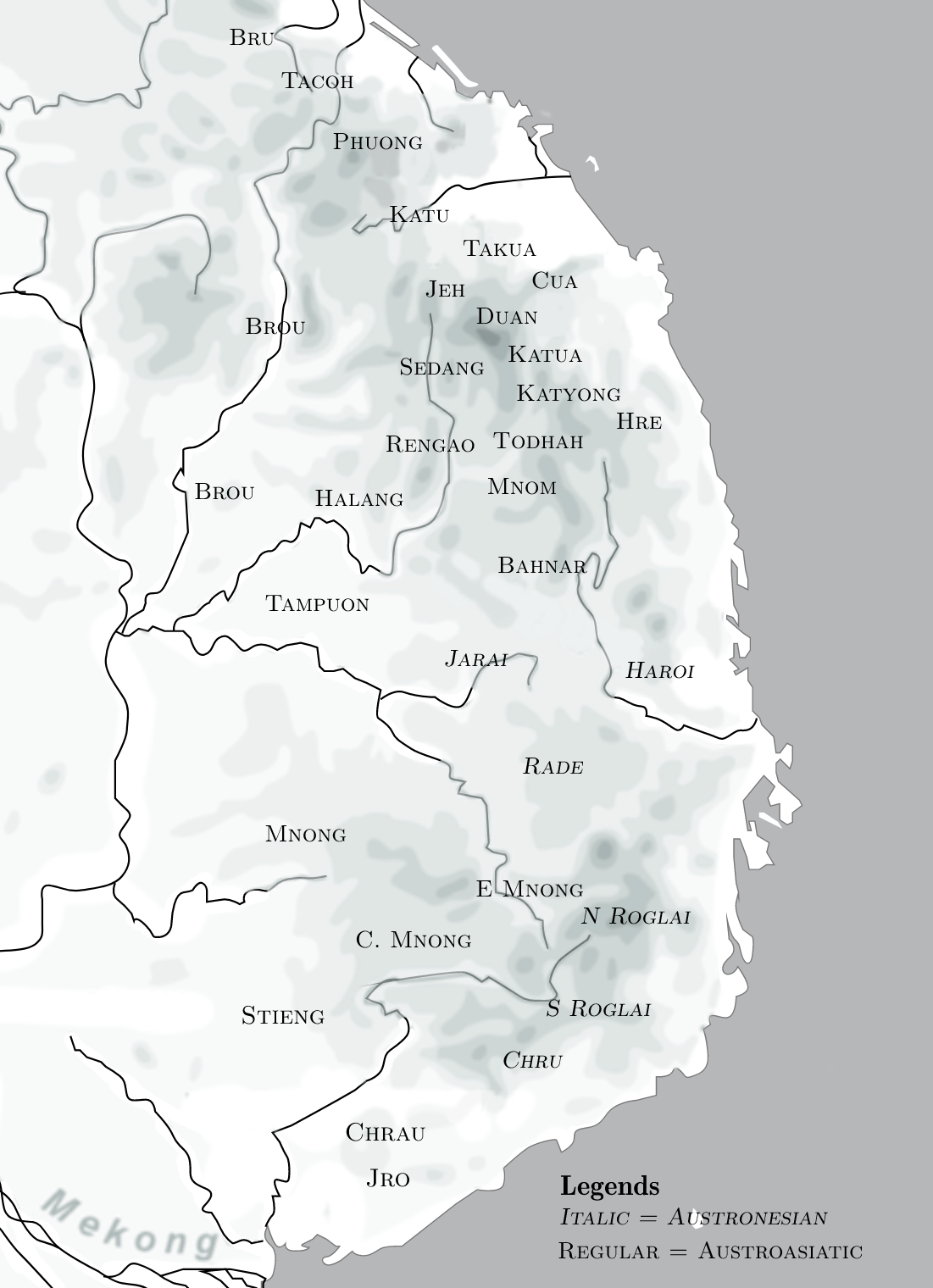
Distribution of ethnic groups in the Central Highlands

Below is a list of officially recognized ethnic groups in Vietnam that are indigenous to the Central Highlands and nearby areas. They speak Austroasiatic languages of the Katuic and Bahnaric, as well as Chamic languages (which belong to the Austronesian language family). Population statistics are from the 2009 Vietnam Population Census.

- Katuic speakers
  - Bru (2009 population: 74,506): Quảng Trị Province
  - Cơ Tu (2009 population: 61,588): Da Nang
  - Tà Ôi (2009 population: 43,886): Huế and Quảng Trị Province
- Bahnaric speakers
  - West Bahnaric
    - Brâu (2009 population: 397): Quảng Ngãi province
  - East Bahnaric
    - Co (2009 population: 33,817): Quảng Ngãi Province
  - North Bahnaric
    - Xơ Đăng (2009 population: 169,501): Quảng Ngãi province and Da Nang
    - Hrê (2009 population: 127,420): Quảng Ngãi Province
    - Rơ Măm (2009 population: 436): Quảng Ngãi province
  - Central Bahnaric
    - Ba Na (2009 population: 227,716): Gia Lai Province and Quảng Ngãi province
    - Giẻ Triêng (2009 population: 50,962): Quảng Ngãi province and Da Nang
  - South Bahnaric
    - Chơ Ro (2009 population: 26,855): Đồng Nai Province
    - Cờ Ho (2009 population: 166,112): Lâm Đồng Province
    - Mạ (2009 population: 41,405): Lâm Đồng Province
    - X’Tiêng (2009 population: 85,436): Đồng Nai province
    - Mnông (2009 population: 102,741): Đắk Lắk Province and Lâm Đồng province
- Chamic speakers
  - Chăm (2009 population: 161,729): Khánh Hòa province and Lâm Đồng province
  - Chu Ru (2009 population: 19,314): Lâm Đồng Province
  - Ê Đê (2009 population: 331,194): Đắk Lắk Province
  - Gia Rai (2009 population: 411,275): Gia Lai Province
  - Ra Glai (2009 population: 122,245): Khánh Hòa Province

Listed by province, from north to south as well as west to east:

- Quảng Trị Province: Bru (Katuic), Tà Ôi (Katuic)
- Huế: Tà Ôi (Katuic)
- Da Nang: Cơ Tu (Katuic), Xơ Đăng (North Bahnaric), Giẻ Triêng (Central Bahnaric)
- Quảng Ngãi Province: Hrê (North Bahnaric), Co (East Bahnaric), Giẻ Triêng (Central Bahnaric), Ba Na (Central Bahnaric), Xơ Đăng (North Bahnaric), Rơ Măm (North Bahnaric), Brâu (West Bahnaric)
- Gia Lai Province: Gia Rai (Chamic), Ba Na (Central Bahnaric)
- Đắk Lắk Province: Ê Đê (Chamic), Mnông (South Bahnaric)
- Khánh Hòa Province: Ra Glai (Chamic), Chăm (Chamic)
- Lâm Đồng province: Mnông (South Bahnaric), Chu Ru (Chamic), Mạ (South Bahnaric), Cờ Ho (South Bahnaric), Chăm (Chamic)
- Đồng Nai Province: Chơ Ro (South Bahnaric), Xtiêng (South Bahnaric)

== Culture ==
Bahnar is the second ethnic group, after the Kinh people, to have their language written based on Latin script by French missionaries in 1861. The Ede people, then, had their writing system in 1923. The first known epic poetry Dam San was compiled and published in Paris, France, under the name Le Chanson de DamSan. The bilingual Ede-French edition was then released in 1933 by the French School of the Far East's magazine in Hanoi. In February 1949, a prehistoric lithophone named Ndut Lieng Krak was discovered in Dak Lak, which is now kept at the Museum of Mankind, Paris. The space of gong culture in the Central Highlands of Vietnam was recognized by UNESCO as a Masterpiece of the Oral and Intangible Heritage of Humanity on 15 January 2005.

== Economy, natural resources, society, and environment ==
In comparison with other regions in Vietnam, the Central Highlands has to encounter great difficulties in socio-economic conditions such as the skilled labor shortage, poor infrastructure, possibilities of ethnic-group conflict in a small area and a low standard of living. This area, however, has many advantages in natural resources. The region is home to nearly 2 million hectares of fertile basalt, making up for 60% of the national basalt soil, which is very suitable for industrial crops such as coffee, cocoa, pepper, mulberry, and tea. Coffee is the most important industrial commodity of the Central Highlands. The current coffee area here is over 290 thousand hectares, accounting for 80% of the country's coffee area. Dak Lak is the province with the widest coffee area (170 thousand hectares) and Buon Ma Thuot coffee is famous for its high quality. The Central Highlands is also the second-largest rubber tree region after the Southeast, mainly in Gia Lai and Dak Lak. The Central Highlands is the most enormous mulberry and silkworm area in our country as well, the most in Bao Loc Lam Dong. This place has a consortium of the largest silk incubators exported in Vietnam.

Unequal land and resource allocation also spark many disputes. Previously, the government aimed to exploit the Central Highlands of Vietnam by establishing a system of state-owned agriculture and forestry farms (before 1993, there were major agricultural-forestry-industry Union Enterprises, which switched to central or provincial agriculture and forestry farms after the same year). In reality, these economic organizations control most of the Central Highlands’ land. In Dak Lak province, by 1985, three agricultural-forestry-industry Union Enterprises managed 1,058,000 hectares, which accounted for half of the province's area, plus 1,600,000 hectares of state-owned rubber tree growing area. In total, the state runs 90% of Dak Lak’s area, and 60% of Gia Lai’s. Overall, by 1985, 70% of the Central Highlands’ surface area was under the state's management. After 1993, although there was a shift in management mechanism, this number only decreased by 26%.

Forest resources and forestry land areas in Tay Nguyen are facing the risk of serious attenuation due to different reasons, such as small unowned area of deep forest is being trespassed by newly arrived migrants for residential and production purposes (which rapidly increases the agricultural land in the whole region), as well as deforestation and illegal exploitation of forest products. Due to the attenuation of forest resources, the output of logging has constantly been decreasing, from 600 to 700 thousand square meters in the late 1980s - early 1990s to about 200-300 thousand square meters per year at the moment. Currently, local authorities are experimenting with allocating, leasing forestry land to organizations, households and individuals for stable usage and forest allocation, and contracting to forests protection for households and communities in the villages.

With the geographical advantages of highland and numerous waterfalls, hydropower resources of the area are large and are used effectively. Two hydroelectric power stations built in this region before are Da Nhim (240 MW) on Da Nhim River (source of Dong Nai River) and Dray H’inh (120 MW) on Serepok River. Moreover, Yaly Hydropower (720 MW), Dai Ninh Hydropower (300 MW), and Plei Krong Hydropower (100 MW) have all been completed and are operational. Tay Nguyen (the central highland of Vietnam) does not abound in mineral resources but is abundant in bauxite reserves measuring at billions of tons.

According to old Soviet documents, the Central Highlands holds about 8 billion tons of bauxite reserve. On 1 November 2007, the Prime Minister signed Decision no.167 to approve the zoning plan for exploration, mining, processing and using of bauxite ore in the 2007–2015, orientation to 2025. Vietnam National Coal - Mineral Industries Group is currently exploring and investing in some bauxite exploring, alumina mining projects in the Central Highlands. However, this implementation has generated fierce opposition from scientists and local people due to the environmental destruction and the negative impacts on social culture, especially the indigenous culture of the Central Highlands.

== Tourist attractions ==
=== Đắk Lắk ===
With an average elevation of 400 – 800 m above sea level, Dak Lak Province is located in the Dak Lak Plateau, which is one of the three largest plateaus in the Central Highlands. Dak Lak borders Gia Lai to the north and north-east, Lam Dong to the south, Cambodia to the west, Phu Yen and Khanh Hoa to the east.

Dak Lak is home to many majestic waterfalls and lakes such as Thuy Tien Waterfall, Lak Lake, Buon Triet Lake, Ea Kao Lake.

There are primeval forests, Yok Don National Park and Ea Kao Ecological Park.

Don village is well known for elephant hunting and taming, historical relics such as Cham tơers in the 13th century, Bao Dai Palace and Buon Ma Thuot Prison.

=== Ðắk Nông ===
Dak Nong Province is located in the southwest of Central Vietnam, at the end of the Truong Son Range and lies on a large plateau with an elevation of 500 meters above sea level.

Dak Nong is renowned for the majestic landscape of waterfalls, nighttime campfires with the sound of gongs and the local-favored stem wine.

The Srepok river with its tributaries form numerous stunning cascades, which can be mild at some points, and real havoc at another. Even more noticeable are Gia Long waterfall with the shape of a sleeping mountain girl and Dray Nur waterfall, which resembles a Great wall of nature. Besides, there are also falls of Dieu Thanh, Three Layers and Dray Sap, also known as Smoke waterfall since it is obscured by layers of water mist all year round.

=== Gia Lai ===
Gia Lai is a province in the mountainous region located in the north of The Central Highlands with an elevation of 600–800 m. Gia Lai borders Kon Tum in the north, Dak Lak in the south, Cambodia in the west, and Quang Ngai, Binh Dinh, Phu Yen in the east.

This region possesses a long history and an ancient culture. This culture's identity is intricately involved with ethnic minorities, primarily Gia Rai and Ba Na. Their specificities are exhibited through communal houses, stilt houses, funeral houses, traditional festivals, costumes and musical instruments.

Gia lai is home to numerous lakes, streams, waterfalls, mountain passes, and primeval forests.

Coming to Gia Lai, Xung Khoeng waterfall (Chu Prong district) and Phu Cuong waterfall (Chu Se district) are well-known destinations. There are many streams such as White Rock Creek, Dream Spring.

=== Kon Tum ===
Kon Tum is a province to the north of Gia Lai - Kon Tum plateau, which is one of the three biggest ones in Tay Nguyen.

Kon Tum City is built on Đắk Bla riverside, a branch of Pơ Ko river. It is also a former French Administrative Center. French missionaries arrived here in 1851.

There are Ngọc Linh Mountain, Chu Mon Ray, Sa Thay primitive forest, Đắk Tre tourism area, and Đắk Tô hot springs. There are more than 20 ethnic groups, the most populated of whom are Ba Na, Xo Dang, Gie Triêng, Gia Rai, B Rau, Ro Min, etc.

Most of the ethnic minorities live by shifting cultivation and hunting. There is a diverse and colorful culture in the community of ethnic groups in Tay Nguyen.

=== Da Lat ===
Da Lat is located on the Lang Biang Plateau in the Central Highlands of Vietnam. Da Lat was established by the French as a hill station and resort town.

Famous attractions include Xuan Huong Lake , Lang Biang Mountain, Datanla Waterfall, Truc Lam Zen Monastery. Several ethnic groups live in the surrounding areas, including the K’Ho, Ma, and Chu Ru people.

== Transport ==
The region is served by 6 airports:

- Lien Khuong International Airport (serving Lâm Đồng)
- Buon Ma Thuot Airport and Tuy Hoa Airport (serving Đắk Lắk)
- Pleiku Airport and Phu Cat Airport (for Gia Lai)
- Chu Lai Airport (for Quảng Ngãi)

== Agriculture ==
Tây Nguyên contains in it many primitive forests and is protected in its national parks, such as Cát Tiên National Park, Yok Đôn National Park, Kon Ka Kinh National Park. The region has an average altitude of 500–600 m with basalt soil, suitable for planting coffee tree, cacao, pepper, and white mulberry. Cashew and rubber plants are also planted here. Coffee is the most important product of Tây Nguyên, with production centred in Đắk Lắk Province. The provincial capital of Buôn Ma Thuột hosts a number of major coffee factories, including ones owned by major producer Trung Nguyên. Tây Nguyên is also the third natural bauxite source in the world. Plans for bauxite mining in the area have met with some controversy, both because of the environmental impact of the proposed operations and because of labour issues.

== Flora and fauna ==
Tây Nguyên is home to the most prominent and also the most endangered species in Vietnam and Southeast Asia, namely, the Indochinese tiger, the gaur, the Wild Asian Water Buffalo, the banteng, and the Asian elephant.

In 2012, at least three Vietnamese soldiers were arrested and imprisoned for their online pictures showing them torturing and killing Gray-shanked douc Langurs.
