= Kuy people =

Ethnic group in Southeast Asia

Kuy
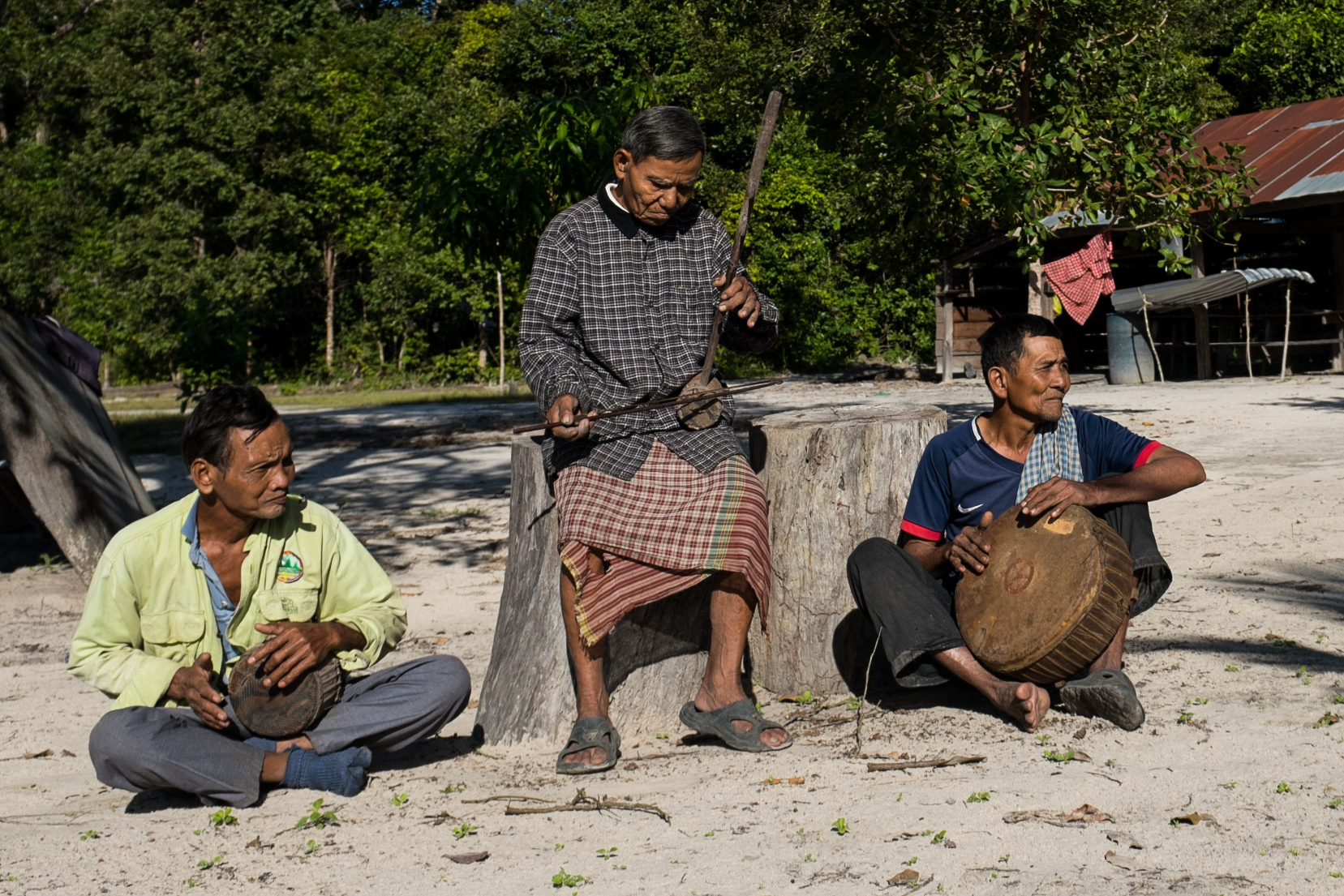
- Kuy male musicians in Chom Penh

Total population
- ~500,000 (est.)

Regions with significant populations
- Mainland Southeast Asia
- Thailand: 400,000 (2006)
- Cambodia: 70,302 (2019)
- Laos: 42,800 (2005)

Languages
- Kuy, Thai, Isan, Lao, and others

Religion
- Animism (or Satsana Phi), Theravada Buddhism

Related ethnic groups
- Katuic peoples

The Kuy (Khmer: កួយ, Thai: กูย, ส่วย, Lao: ກຸຍ, ສ່ວຍ) are an indigenous ethnic group of mainland Southeast Asia. The native lands of the Kuy range from the southern Khorat Plateau in northeast Thailand east to the banks of the Mekong River in southern Laos and south to north central Cambodia. There are also Kuy groups in Vietnam. The Kuy are an ethnic minority in all four countries. Their language is classified as a Katuic language of the Mon-Khmer language family. The Kuy are thought by some scholars to be the original inhabitants of parts of Cambodia, Laos, and Thailand. The word kuy in the Kuy language means 'people' or 'human being'; alternate English spellings include Kui, Kuoy, and Kuay, while forms similar to suay or suei are derived from the Thai/Lao exonyms meaning 'those who pay tribute' (Thai: ส่วย). The Kuy Ajiang or elephant Kuy in Thailand are known as skilled mahouts, or elephant trainers, and many Kuy Ajiang villages are employed in finding, taming, and selling elephants.

== Geographic distribution ==
The Kuy are found in a region of mainland Southeast Asia roughly between the Dangrek Mountains and the Mun River, straddling the borders where Thailand, Cambodia, and Laos meet. Although exact population estimates are uncertain, of an estimated 400,000 Kuy people living in these three countries, 220,000 are thought to be in Thailand. In Thailand, the Kuy mainly live in the southern Isan region, encompassing the provinces of Surin, Buriram, Sisaket, Nakhon Ratchasima, and Ubon Ratchathani. In Lao, the Kuy mainly live in Attapeu, Savannakhet, Salavan and Champasak provinces along both banks of the Mekong. Across the Cambodian border, the Kuy live mainly in Preah Vihear, Steung Treng, Siem Reap, and northern Kampong Thom with a small population in Kratie.

In Cambodia, where significant numbers of Kuy also live among the Khmer, they are considered a Khmer Loeu group while in Laos there are counted among the Lao Theung ("midland Lao"). In Thailand, Kuy people often live in mixed villages alongside the Northern Khmer.

Regions with significant Kuy populations

== Culture ==
While sharing some similarities, traditional Kuy culture has variations between groups as well as between different countries and many Kuy today have been influenced by the dominant culture of the country in which they live.

=== Kuy in Thailand ===
Research of the late-19th to early-20th century reported that the Kuy of the time were "vaguely aware" of different clans or tribes within Kuy society, but even by that time consciousness of these divisions was waning. A 1988 study found that modern Kuy were no longer conscious of any clan or tribal affiliation and, among themselves, only recognized differences in dialect and national origin. One exception were the approximately 200 Kuy Nheu (ɲə), found in the Phrai Bueng and Rasi Salai districts of Sisaket province in Thailand, who were "very conscious of the fact that they were different from all other Kui". Despite this, there are distinct variations in cultural traditions and beliefs between different villages and Kuy communities within Thailand.

Although 20th century Thaification policies outlawing spirit worship have resulted in most Kuy adopting the local form of Theravada Buddhism, animism or satsana phi, involving the veneration of spirits, is the primary religious or cosmological belief for the Kuy in Thailand, alongside Buddhism. The specific spirits worshipped vary. The Kuy Malo and Kuy Malua in Surin and Sisaket provinces, for example, believe in the monitor lizard (takuat) as a symbol of fertility and guardian spirit. The Kuy Mahai in Ubon Ratchathani believe in the spirit of Ahya Chamnak, which serves as a gateway to the forest and grants the community permission to access to the area's natural resources.

Another important Kuy tradition is the Klae Mo healing ceremony. The ritual takes place in the second and third lunar months (January and February) and is led by a ritual leader is a spirit medium called the 'Mae Or'. The Klae Mo ceremony involves traditional song, dance, and spirit possession.

Elephant-related traditions are specific to the Kuy Ajiang or 'elephant Kuy', who captured and trained elephants and primarily live in Surin province. These Kuy traditionally caught elephants along the Dangrek mountain range, crossing into Cambodia. However, this practice ended due to geopolitical tension between the two countries in the late 1950s. Some Kuy families still keep elephants for tourism. The Kuy Ajiang venerate their own set of spirits related to this work, specifically the spirit of "Phra Khru Pakam", which resides in the Pakam rope—a lasso traditionally used in elephant catching. Kuy elephant wisdom (คชศาสตร์ชาวกูย) was registered on Thailand's national intangible cultural heritage list in 2012.

=== Kuy in Cambodia ===
Kuy people in Cambodia, in particular the Kuy Dek or 'iron Kuy' are known for their role in iron smelting and blacksmithing during the Khmer empire, with archaeological evidence of this practice found in Kuy territory dating back to roughly A.D. 800. This practice began to decline during the French colonial period, coming to an end in the 1940s due to price competition with suppliers in the West.

The Kuy people in Cambodia primarily practice irrigated rice cultivation, although some groups maintain a practice of shifting cultivation. Some Kuy also raise silk worms and weave silk, with some Kuy artisans known for their unique basket and textile weaving skills.

Although there is internal variation, central Kuy beliefs revolve around animism, and the belief in local spirits related to the forests and mountains surrounding the Kuy villages, commonly referred to as Ah'ret. The Ah'ret are consulted before key life events, related to farming, collecting resources from the forest, or social occasions such as marriage. Belief in these spirits does not negate Buddhist practice. Seventy-four percent of the Kuy in Cambodia are no longer fluent in Kuy, having adopted Khmer for daily use, and many have all but integrated into Khmer society although a significant portion still participates in traditional Kuy spiritual activities alongside Khmer Buddhism. Women have an esteemed position in Kui society ensuring community cohesion and spiritual beliefs, with female elders known as Yeak Chaeng or Yeak Chheon Chaeng serving as spiritual and ritual leaders.

Today, the Kuy people are actively engaged in efforts to preserve Prey Lang forest in Cambodia. Prey Lang's name originated from the Kuy language and means "the forest (Prey) which belongs to all of us". Organisations including Amnesty International and Cultural Survival have documented how Kuy people have faced development aggression and been forcefully evicted from their homes due to economic land concessions. The "spirit forest" in which the Ah'ret live is an integral part of Kuy culture, however, these spaces are increasingly impacted by mining interests as Cambodia develops.

Archaeological and cultural heritage in the area of Techo Sen Russey Treb Cambodian Royal Academy Park in Preah Vihear province has been associated with the history of Kuy communities in northern Cambodia.

The Kuy are active members of the Cambodian Indigenous Youth Association.

=== Kuy in Laos ===
There is limited information on the Kuy in Laos compared to those in Cambodia and Thailand. The Kuy in Lao primarily practiced subsistence agriculture, utilising shifting cultivation to grow rice, alongside subsistence hunting and fishing. The Lao government began to implement policies to eliminate this form of swidden agriculture after becoming a communist country in 1975.

== Language ==
The Kuy language belongs to the Austroasiatic language family, within which several more closely related languages, including Bru, Ta-Oi, and Kuy, among others, make up the Katuic subgroup. Kuy accounts for the largest group of Katuic speakers with recent estimates placing their numbers at 800,000, double the more conservative traditionally accepted estimates. Although it still retains a relatively high number of speakers compared to other minority languages, the Kuy language is considered endangered. As with other aspects of Kuy culture, however, language use varies based on the country of residence.

Separated by distance, geographical features and political borders, Kuy speakers' speech has evolved into several marked, but mutually intelligible, dialects. In Thailand, two major dialects have been recognized (Kuay and Kuuy), each of which can be further divided into sub-dialects. Cambodian Kuy has been described as having four distinct dialects (Kuy Mla, Kuy Ntua, Kuy Ntra, and Kuy Thmei), while the political situation in Laos has made study of Kuy dialects there difficult.

The Kuy in Thailand have been subject to Thaification policies in the past and, while maintaining positive views about their native language (Kuy), most often use the local Lao dialect. Thai Kuy are also fluent in Central Thai and 40 percent also use Northern Khmer. A majority of monolingual Kuy speakers are in Laos, where approximately 80 percent speak only Kuy. The remaining Kuy of Laos also uses Lao. Only 26 percent of the Kuy in Cambodia reported being able to communicate in the Kuy language with the remainder speaking only Khmer. This has been attributed to restrictions on speaking the Kuy language implemented during the Khmer Rouge, and Khmer being the primary language of education.

Although the Kuy language is primarily a spoken one, without a traditional alphabet, the Kui Association of Thailand recently launched a Kui/Kuy writing system, developed by Dr. Sanong Suksaweang. However, most of the Kuy have not learned and have been using their national language scripts as a substitute, that is the Thai script in Thailand, Khmer script in Cambodia, and Lao script in Laos. The Kuy in Thailand have folklore explaining why they lack a written script, describing how the Kuy alphabet was once written on buffalo hide, but was eaten by a dog, resulting in the Kuy saying 'ajor jar jim' or 'the dog ate it all'.

== Famous Kuy people ==
- Buakaw Banchamek — Thai Kuy descent welterweight Muay Thai kickboxer
- Tony Jaa — Thai Kuy descent martial artist, actor, action choreographer, stuntman and director
- Chai Chidchob – Thai politician of Kuy descent
- Newin Chidchob – Thai politician of Kuy descent
