= Katuic peoples =

The Katuic peoples live mainly in central Vietnam's Truong Son region and the highlands of south eastern Laos and speak the Katuic languages. The peoples include the Katu, Ta Oi, Pacoh, Bru (Van Kieu) in Vietnam and the Kuy. The Katuic groups in Laos include the Kuy, Bru, Ta'oih, Kantu, Dakkang, Triw, Chatong and Ngeq.

They subsist mainly on shifting cultivation, hunting and fishing. They traditionally lived in small villages centered on a communal house. Their religion revolves around the spirits of the forest, the Rice Mother and ancestor spirits. Even today, these groups retain most of their traditions and spirit beliefs. However, they have been heavily affected by the newly constructed Ho Chi Minh Highway, which cuts straight through the homeland of the Vietnamese Katuic groups.

The French military officer Le Pichon, who was stationed among the Katu in 1938, wrote a short book about entitled Les Chasseurs de Sang (The Blood Hunters) about the (now non-existent) practice of the Katu to hunt people to please certain spirits.
