= Pacoh =

Pacoh may refer to:

- Pacoh people
- Pacoh language
