= Ung =

Ung or UNG may refer to:

== People ==
- Woong, a Korean given name also spelled Ung
- Ung (surname), a Cambodian and Norwegian surname
- Ung Thị (full name Nguyễn Phúc Ung Thị; 1913–2001), Vietnamese-born American businessman
- Franz Unger (1800–1870), Austrian botanist, often abbreviated "Ung." in citations

== Other uses ==
- Ung County, a county of the Kingdom of Hungary, now parts of Slovakia and Ukraine
- Kiunga Airport, Papua New Guinea (IATA: UNG)
- Ngarinyin language, an Australian Aboriginal language (ISO 639-3: ung)
- State University of Gorontalo (Universitas Negeri Gorontalo), a university in Indonesia
- University of North Georgia, Georgia, United States
- Uracil-DNA glycosylase, a human gene

== See also ==
- Ong (disambiguation)
