= Katang language =

Katang or Kataang may be,

- the Katang dialect of the Ta’Oi language,
- an alternative spelling of Kattang, or Gathang language,

or one of the other languages spoken by the Katang people,

- Northern Katang language
- Southern Katang language
