= Katu people =

Ethnic group of Vietnam and Laos

Katu
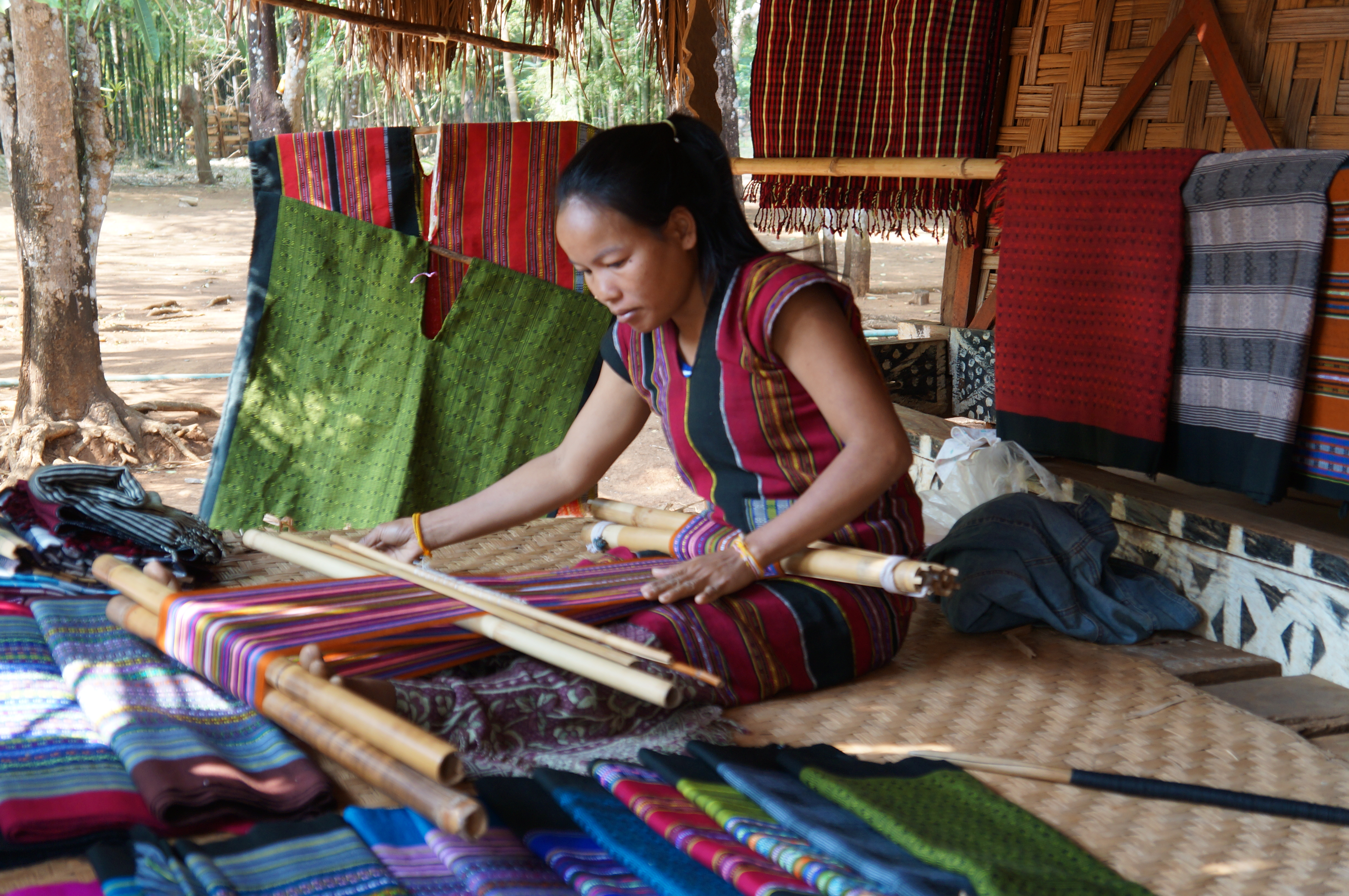
- Laos Plateau des Bolovens weaving in Ban Lao Ngam

Total population
- 102,551

Regions with significant populations
- Vietnam, Laos
- Vietnam: 74,173 (2019)
- Laos: 28,378 (2015)

Languages
- Katu • Phuong • Vietnamese • Lao

Religion
- Animism • Christianity

Related ethnic groups
- Pacoh, Brao, Ta Oi

The Katuic people (also Co Tu, Ca Tang; Vietnamese: người Cơ Tu; Katu: Manứih Cơ Tu) are an ethnic group of about 102,551 who live in eastern Laos and central Vietnam. Numbered among the Katuic peoples, they speak a Mon-Khmer language. Katuic languages have been developed by Paul Sidwell, but Sidwell's work is not commonly used in Katuic communities due to language barriers.

== Laos ==
The Katu in Laos live in Sekong Province along the upper Sekong River and in the highland basin of the Song Boung river watershed along the border with Vietnam's Quảng Nam Province and Huế city. There were 28,378 of them in Laos in 2015.

== Vietnam ==
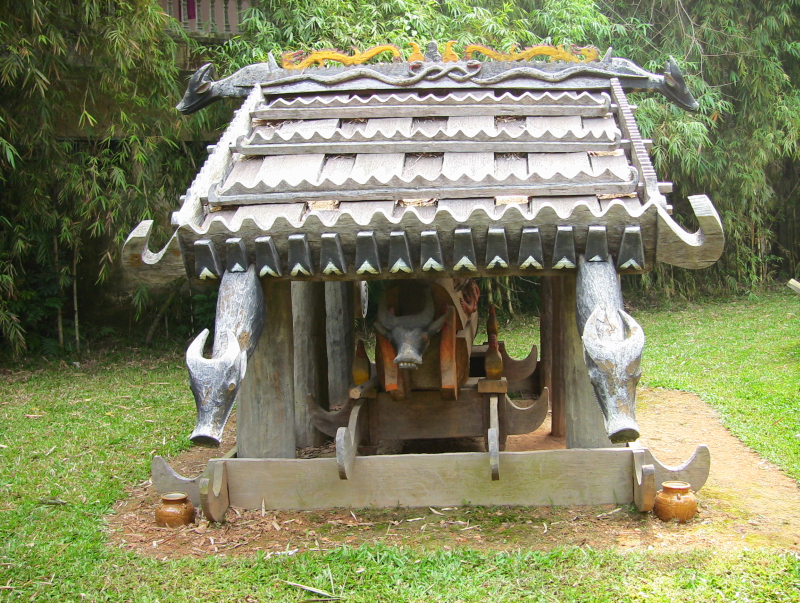
Model of a Co Tu tomb

The Vietnamese government's official name for the Katu ethnic group is "Cơ Tu". Within Vietnam, Katu people are indigenous groups recognized by the Vietnamese government and they almost live in the provinces of Thừa Thiên–Huế, Quảng Nam, and Da Nang city. The Katu in Vietnam numbered 50,458 in the 1999 census, 61,588 in the 2009 census, and 74,173 in the 2019 census.

The Katu typically serve rice cooked in bamboo stems such as zăr, aví hor, koo dep, koo g'đhoong, and cha chắc, and drink a beverage called tavak. Their famous dances are tung tung (performed by males) and ya yá (performed by females). They play h'roa in ordinary life. Traditional Katu homes are on stilts and those who live on the Laotian border are known for growing jute and weaving. Some 15,000 Katu in Thừa Thiên–Huế speak Phuong, a Katuic dialect often recognized as a separate language. They are also notorious for the wide variety of Austroasiatic carrying baskets that they have developed. Nowadays, Katu peoples' lives are modernized, and many young Katuic people go to the cities to study and find jobs. Some of them go abroad to advance their education. Dr Tho Alang (Alăng Thớ) is recognized as the first of the Katu people to gain a Doctor of Philosophy (in Management) from the RMIT University (Australia).
