= Phi Pakam =

Forest god of the Kui in Southeast Asia

Phi Pakam Ajing (ผีปะกำอาจีง) or Phi Pakam (ผีปะกำ) is the supreme god of the forests according to the beliefs of the Kui people. They are worshipped in particular by elephant keepers.

== Etymology ==
Phi means ghosts or spirits. In the Kui language, the word Pakam (ปะกำ) means noose while Ajing (อาจีง)" means elephants, thus the name Pakam Ajing means elephants tied together by a noose. Kui people believe that the spirit resides in the Pakam skin made out of cowhide or buffalo hide and wood (called a Wal Praeng (วาลแปรง) in Kui), which can be twisted to form a leather rope of 40 meters long, one end of which is a noose used to tether elephants.

== Beliefs ==
The Kui people believe that there are two types of spirits residing in Pakam. The first is Phra Khru (พระครู) which is a holy spirit comparable to an angel, and the second are Phi Banphachon (ผีบรรพชน) which are the ancestral spirits of a family who used to be elephant doctors. They believe that the spirits can both bring blessings and harm to people, therefore, sacrifices must always be made. The Kui people will pay homage to Phi Pakam before going out to catch elephants. And once the elephant has been tethered, offerings will be made again. If an elephant needed to be taken outside the village, or when children are sick, offerings or vows will be made to the Pakam spirits.

The Kui people build a Pakam shrine for the Pakam spirits to live in. They are mostly built to the east of the house. It is a thatched roof shrine with four pillars, about two meters high. Children and women are forbidden from entering it. Inside the shrine is a collection of Pakam skins, a small pillow, a set of five Khanda cones, a glass filled with water, a rope and a noose made of cowhide, and various offerings.
