= Hướng Hóa district =

Coordinates: 16.750°N 106.667°E

Hướng Hóa district Huyện Hướng Hóa
- District
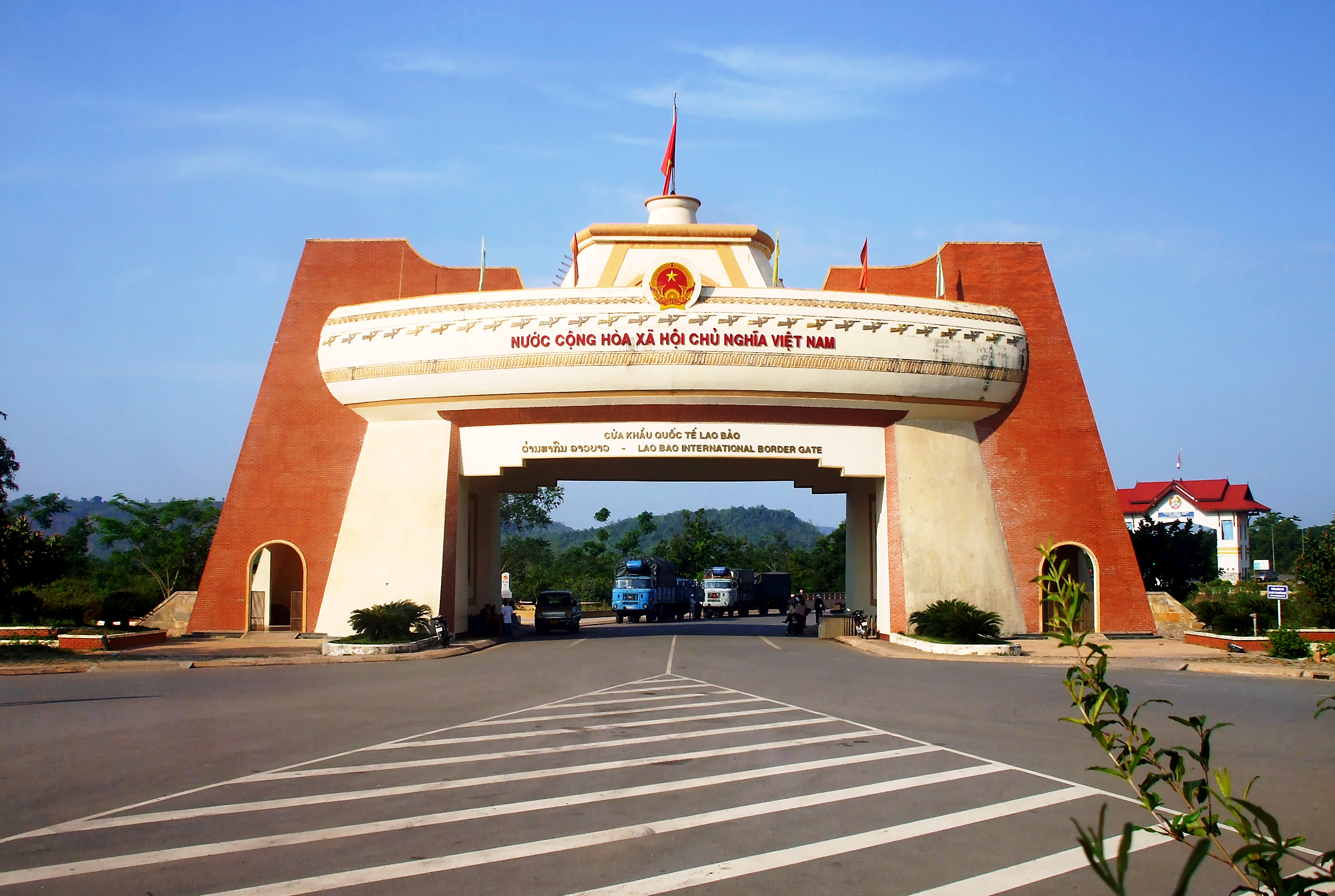
- Lao Bảo international border gate in Quảng Trị province

- Seal
- Interactive map of Hướng Hóa district
- Country: Vietnam
- Region: North Central Coast
- Province: Quảng Trị
- Capital: Khe Sanh

Population (2003)
  - Total: 69,003
- Time zone: UTC+7 (UTC + 7)

Hướng Hóa is a rural district of Quảng Trị province in the North Central Coast region of Vietnam. As of 2003 the district had a population of 69,003. The district covers an area of 1,145 km^{2}. The district capital lies at Khe Sanh. The population is made up of ethnic Vietnamese as well as Bru people and Ta Oi people.

== History ==
It was the site of the Battle of Khe Sanh in early-1968, one of the bloodiest engagements of the Vietnam War. Khe Sanh was the location of a US Marine base, so it was often attacked by Viet Cong guerrillas as well as North Vietnamese regulars

The district is mountainous and rugged, and is around 20 km to the east of the border with Laos. It is 65 km to the west of the town of Đông Hà.

== Divisions ==
It consists of two towns, Khe Sanh the district seat, and Lao Bảo.

It has 20 communes. These include Xy, A Túc, A Dơi, A Xing, Thanh, Thuận, Pa Tầng, Hướng Lộc. Other districts are designated as New Economic Zones, located on National Road 9. There are five of these, Tân Hợp, Tân Liên, Tân Lập, Tân Long and Tân Thành. Six communes lie on where the Ho Chi Minh trail once branched into the area near the DMZ. These are Hướng Tân, Hướng Linh, Hướng Phùng, Hướng Sơn, Hướng Việt and Hướng Lập. To the southeast of the district is the commune Húc.

== Towns ==
- Lao Bảo

== Climate ==
Climate data for Khe Sanh, Hướng Hóa District
Month	Jan	Feb	Mar	Apr	May	Jun	Jul	Aug	Sep	Oct	Nov	Dec	Year
Record high °C (°F)	33.2 (91.8)	35.7 (96.3)	38.1 (100.6)	39.3 (102.7)	38.3 (100.9)	38.0 (100.4)	35.5 (95.9)	34.8 (94.6)	34.3 (93.7)	38.1 (100.6)	37.2 (99.0)	32.3 (90.1)	39.3 (102.7)
Mean daily maximum °C (°F)	22.1 (71.8)	23.9 (75.0)	27.5 (81.5)	30.9 (87.6)	31.5 (88.7)	30.4 (86.7)	29.6 (85.3)	29.1 (84.4)	28.9 (84.0)	26.9 (80.4)	24.2 (75.6)	21.7 (71.1)	27.2 (81.0)
Daily mean °C (°F)	18.1 (64.6)	19.2 (66.6)	21.8 (71.2)	24.6 (76.3)	25.9 (78.6)	25.9 (78.6)	25.4 (77.7)	25.0 (77.0)	24.4 (75.9)	23.1 (73.6)	21.0 (69.8)	18.5 (65.3)	22.7 (72.9)
Mean daily minimum °C (°F)	15.8 (60.4)	16.6 (61.9)	18.6 (65.5)	21.1 (70.0)	22.6 (72.7)	23.2 (73.8)	22.7 (72.9)	22.6 (72.7)	22.0 (71.6)	21.0 (69.8)	19.1 (66.4)	16.7 (62.1)	20.2 (68.4)
Record low °C (°F)	8.2 (46.8)	9.2 (48.6)	8.6 (47.5)	13.5 (56.3)	16.1 (61.0)	17.5 (63.5)	19.4 (66.9)	19.6 (67.3)	17.2 (63.0)	13.7 (56.7)	12.0 (53.6)	7.7 (45.9)	7.7 (45.9)
Average precipitation mm (inches)	18.4 (0.72)	18.4 (0.72)	38.4 (1.51)	86.8 (3.42)	159.9 (6.30)	193.6 (7.62)	223.0 (8.78)	283.2 (11.15)	376.6 (14.83)	456.8 (17.98)	197.3 (7.77)	62.8 (2.47)	2,113.1 (83.19)
Average rainy days	10.0	7.4	8.3	10.5	16.3	16.9	18.6	22.2	20.6	21.0	19.0	15.9	187.0
Average relative humidity (%)	90.2	89.7	86.0	83.3	82.9	84.4	85.9	88.6	90.0	90.6	90.7	90.5	87.7
Mean monthly sunshine hours	125.2	124.6	164.5	189.8	203.7	170.4	162.4	150.8	141.5	126.3	104.0	89.4	1,764.9
Source: Vietnam Institute for Building Science and Technology
