= So Daeseong jeon =

So Daeseong jeon or Sodaeseongjeon (蘇大成傳 The Tale of So Daeseong) is a Korean heroic novel. Written before 1794, the author is unknown.

The story is about So Daeseong, a generous poor man in China who wants to marry a rich woman named Chaebong. However, her family will not condone the match.. A dejected So Daeseong descends into gluttony and sleep for a long time. He eventually becomes a warrior monk and defeats an invading army. So Daeseong then becomes emperor and is able to marry Chaebong.

== Introduction ==
There is an old Korean saying, used to tease someone who constantly sleeps: “Just like So Daeseong, all you ever do is sleep.” The “So Daeseong” referred to in this adage is the main character of the story, So Daeseong.

== Authorship ==
The author of this story is unknown. Oda Ikuguro (小田幾五郞, 1754–1831), a Japanese interpreter at the official interpreter's office in Tsushima Island, recorded a list of Joseon novels in 1794 within the Sangseo gimun (象胥記聞Diplomats’ Travelogue): “Jangpungunjeon (張豐雲傳 The Tale of Jang Pungun), Guunmong (九雲夢 The Cloud Dream of the Nine), Choehyeonjeon (崔賢傳, The Tale of Choe Hyeon), Sodaeseongjeon, Jangbakjeon (張朴傳 The Tale of Jang Bak), Im janggun chungnyeoljeon (林將軍忠烈傳 The Tale of General Im’s Unwavering Loyalty), Sounjeon (蘇雲傳 The Tale of So Un), Choechungjeon (崔忠傳 The Tale of Choe Chung), as well as Sassijeon (謝氏傳The Tale of the Sa Family), Sukyangjeon (淑香傳 The Tale of Sukyang), Okgyori (玉嬌梨 The Two Fair Cousins), Lee Baekgyeongjeon (李白慶傳 The Tale of Lee Baekgyeong).”

From this record, we can thus ascertain that Sodaeseongjeon was written before 1794.

== Plot ==
One year, during the reign of the Ming Dynasty's Chenghua Emperor, Zhu Jiansen (1465–1487), there was a man named Soyang who served as the Minister of National Defense. Soyang was over fifty years old but still had no children. One day, he went to the Cheongnyong Temple in the Yeongbo Mountains in Western China. There, he donated gold amounting to thousands of nyang (a Korean unit of currency at the time) to the old monk residing at the temple. A few days later, his wife dreamed that the Dragon King of the East Sea banished his son to the human world for his sins and shortly afterwards, she gave birth to So Daeseong.

When So Daeseong was ten years old, both his parents died. After organizing and settling his family fortune, So Daeseong left home. During his travels, he runs into an elderly person, wailing from sadness because they cannot obtain a grave site for their mother out of sheer poverty. Upon hearing the person's story, he gives them all his money. Afterwards, So Daeseong is reduced to living like a beggar and roams the countryside.

In the region of Cheongju, Chancellor Lee is entering old age and is spending time in his hometown. One day, Chancellor Lee has a dream of a blue dragon lying in a fishing spot. Upon waking, he goes to the fishing spot and there finds So Daeseong, sleeping in his impoverished state. He brings So Daeseong home and offers the hand of his youngest daughter, Chaebong, in order to make him his son-in-law. However, Chancellor Lee's wife, Madame Wang, is disgruntled by So Daeseong's entrance and dislikes his intrusion.

Right before So Daeseong and Chaebong's wedding, Chancellor Lee becomes ill and passes away. Upon his death, So Daeseong spends all his days sleeping the time away in his grief. Madame Wang and her three sons together plot to drive So Daeseong out and send an assassin after him, but the assassin is instead killed by So Daeseong. Recalling the Chancellor's kindness towards him, So Daeseong decides not to pursue revenge and quietly leaves their home. After aimlessly wandering, So Daeseong arrives at the Cheongnyong Temple in the Yeongbo Mountains and learns the art of war and sorcery from an old monk.

Meanwhile, the Huns and the Xionites invade China and the Ming Dynasty falls into crisis. So Daeseong receives a sword, armor and helmet, and a swift horse from the spirits of the old monk at Cheongnyong Temple and Chancellor Lee, as well as from the master of Okpan Mountain. Charging into the battlefield, So Daeseong delivers a fatal blow to the enemy general, Seon U, with a single stroke of his sword, and distinguishes himself in battle. The other enemy commander, “Howang” (Emperor Ho), tricks So Daeseong with numerous schemes and So Daeseong has numerous close calls. However, with help from the heavens, he always manages to escape. After quelling the attacks, So Daeseong is crowned as the “Nowang” (魯王 The Foolish Emperor).

Even after So Daeseong's departure, Chaebong has continuously guarded her chastity and refused marriage. After So Daeseong is crowned emperor, he summons Chaebong and makes her his queen, with their family subsequently enjoying wealth and honor for generations.

== Features and significance ==
Along with Yuchungnyeoljeon (劉忠烈傳 The Tale of Yu Chungryeol) and Joungjeon (趙雄傳 The Tale of Jo Ung), Sodaeseongjeon is one of the most representative examples of the “heroic novel”—a genre of novels popular during this time period that generally follows the template of tracing a hero's life. Based on extant records and the number of currently existing copies, Sodaeseongjeon can be presumed to have been a relatively popular work, even among heroic novels.

Moreover, Yi Ok, a prominent Joseon literatus, resided in Hapcheon, South Gyeongsang Province from October 18, 1799, to February 18, 1800, where he reportedly saw printed copies of Sodaeseongjeon. This was a period of time where Korean novels were published as woodblock prints for commercial purposes and thus, it can be assumed that Sodaeseongjeon was also published and distributed in a similar fashion.

So Daeseong is portrayed as a glutton who eats around 5.7 liters worth of food per meal. If we estimate the average single serving size in contemporary settings to be around 200 milliliters, the amount of food that So Daeseong ate for one meal is equivalent to about 28-29 servings today. Moreover, So Daeseong is a character that is notorious for constantly sleeping—to the extent that the saying, “Just like So Daeseong, all you ever do is sleep,” was created. His association with sleep can be seen in the scene after Chancellor Lee dies, in which So Daeseong falls into despair and sleeps all day long.

The fact that the protagonist, So Daeseong, is characterized by a fondness for eating and sleeping is unique—a character that is seldom found in classical Korean works. Moreover, even though So Daeseong learned the art of war, we see him continuously deceived by the enemy commander's schemes and thus, see his weaknesses as well. However, he spends his entire fortune on behalf of the poor and even forgives Chancellor Lee's sons, who plotted to kill him, out of his loyalty to Chancellor Lee. Thus, we can also see that he is a good-hearted and loyal character and that he is portrayed in a positive light.

== Other ==
Nakseong biryong (洛城飛龍 Flying Dragon in Luoyang) has the same plot as Sodaeseongjeon and only the characters’ names differ. The sequel to Sodaeseongjeon is Yongmunjeon (龍門傳 The Tale of the Dragon's Gate).

== Archival sources ==
Versions of Sodaeseongjeon written in both Korean and classical Chinese currently exist. The Korean version exists as a handwritten manuscript, a woodblock print, and a print created through moveable type. The Chinese version exists in two versions as handwritten manuscripts. The Korean woodblock print versions exists in two types: as a woodblock print originally made in Seoul, and as a woodblock print made in the North Jeolla province. There are 36 copies of the former, and 43 copies of the latter, and each manuscript specifies where they were originally printed.
