= Phuong language =

Katuic language spoken in Vietnam

Phuong
- High Katu
- East Katu
- Native to: Vietnam
- Ethnicity: Katu
- Native speakers: (15,000 cited 1999–2000)
- Language family: Austroasiatic: Katuic; Katu languages; Phuong
- Writing system: Latin

Language codes
- ISO 639-3: Either: phg – Phuong ktv – Eastern Katu
- Glottolog: phuo1238 Phuong east1236 Eastern Katu

Phuong, or High Katu, is a Katuic language (Mon-Khmer) of Vietnam.
