= Ong =

Ong or ONG may refer to:

== Arts and media ==
- Ong's Hat, a collaborative work of fiction
- “Ong Ong”, a song by Blur from the album The Magic Whip

== Places ==
- Ong, Nebraska, US, city
- Ong's Hat, New Jersey, US, ghost town
- Ong River, Odisha, India
- Mornington Island Airport, IATA airport code "ONG"

== Other uses ==
- Ong (surname), a surname (especially a Chinese one)
- Ong language of Laos and Vietnam
- ONE Gas (Oklahoma Natural Gas), a component of ONEOK, Inc.
- Non-governmental organization, abbreviated ONG in French, Italian, Spanish, Romanian and Portuguese (NGO in English)
- Ipomoea aquatica or Ong choi, a semi-aquatic tropical plant grown as a leaf vegetable
- Ong (Washoe folklore), a bird-like mythical creature

== See also ==
- Battle of Ong Thanh, Vietnam (1967)
