= Woong =

- Hangul: 웅
- RR: Ung
- MR: Ung

Woong, also spelled Ung, is a Korean given name. Notable people with the name include:

- Kim Ung (1910/1912 – ?), North Korean general
- Chang Ung (born 1938), North Korean taekwondo athlete
- Namkung Woong (born 1984), South Korean footballer
- Byun Woong (born 1986), South Korean footballer
- Heo Ung (born 1993), South Korean basketball player

Fictional characters with this given name include:

- Jo Ung, the titular protagonist of the late Joseon novel Jo Ung jeon

== See also ==
- List of Korean given names
