= Tale of Yu Chungryeol =

Korean novel (c. 19th century)

Yu Chungryeol-jeon (Korean: 유충렬전; Hanja: 柳忠烈傳; lit. Tale of Yu Chungryeol) is a war (heroic) novel that tells the story of Yu Chungryeol, who saves his family from crisis manufactured by a treacherous courtier and defeats the enemies to protect his country and the emperor.

== Authorship ==
The identity of the author is unknown. The specific time period in which Yu Chungryeol-jeon was written is also unknown but is presumed to be the 19th century or later, considering that most existing editions of the story are from around 1900, and Sangseogimun (象胥記聞 Record of a Translator; 1794), written by a Japanese translator from Tsushima named Ikugoro Oda (小田幾五郞, 1754–1831) listed a number of Korean heroic novels such as So Daeseong jeon (蘇大成傳Tale of So Daeseong) and Jang Pungun-jeon (張豐雲傳 Tale of Jang Pungun) but did not include Yu Chungryeol-jeon.

== Plot ==
Yu Sim, who lived during the reign of Emperor Yingzong of Ming, had no child. He prayed to the heavens for a child at Yeonhwa Peak on Mount Heng, known as the southern mountain of the Five Great Mountains, and gains a son, whom he names Chungryeol. Around this time, two treacherous courtiers Jeong Handam and Choe Ilgwi frame Yu Sim for a crime, and Yu Sim is exiled. His wife Jang struggles to make a living with young Chungryeol, but the two are separated.

Separated from his mother and left all alone, Yu Chungryeol begs for a living and eventually turns 14. Around this time, he is rescued by Prime Minister Gang Hui-ju and marries Kang’s daughter. In the year Yu Chungryeol turns 15, Kang petitions the emperor about the unfairness of Yu Sim’s exile but is also banished. Chungryeol also leaves home to avoid the ensuing hardship, and the whole Kang family is separated. Prime Minister Kang’s wife drowns and their daughter is left alone in a near-death state until she is eventually rescued by a government slave.

After escaping alone, Yu Chungryeol meets an elderly monk at Baengryongsa Temple and studies under him. When the enemies from the south and the north invade the country, Jeong Handam and Choe Ilgwi surrender to the enemies and tryto force the emperor to surrender as well. At this time, Yu Chungryeol fights and defeats the enemies, chases after the enemies who took the empress and the empress dowager as hostages, and rescues them. On the way back, he also rescues his father and Prime Minister Kang from exile and reunites with his mother and wife as well. Yu Chungryeol becomes the Grand Marshal and gains great honor and riches.

== Features and significance ==
While some consider Yu Chungryeol-jeon to be a story about the fall of yangban and the lower class’s desire for upward mobility, others see it as a story about a family’s separation during the war and eventual reunion.

Yu Chungryeol-jeon is classified as a war (gundam) novel or heroic novel. A war novel is a novel in which stories of the battlefield account for a major part of the narrative. Depending on the origin, war novels are classified into original war novels, historical war novels, and adapted (translated) war novels. All feature battles or wars, in which the main characters take an active part. A heroic novel, on the other hand, refers to a novel that tells the life story of a hero with the following characteristics: 1) Noble lineage, 2) extraordinary or supernatural birth, 3) outstanding talent, 4) abandonment as a child, 5) rescued by a helper, 6) crisis in adulthood, and 7) success through a struggle. Depending on the origin, heroic novels are classified into historical heroic novels and original heroic novels. War novels and heroic novels tend to be one and the same, but there are several that are classified as either war novels or heroic novels. Yu Chungryeol-jeon is considered an original heroic novel and an original war novel, along with Jo Ung-jeon and So Daeseong-jeon.

== Other ==
There is a seosamuga (epic shamanic song) titled Chungryeol-gut, which is one of the many seosamuga sang by Yi Gobun, a shaman from the Hamheung area, during mangmukgut, a ritual for appeasing the dead observed in Hamgyeong Province. In addition, Yu Chungryeol-mindam (A Folktale of Yu Chungryeol) is included in An Outline of Oral Literature: Hwasun, South Jeolla Province (구비문학대계, 전라남도 화순편).

== Texts ==
Yu Chungryeol-jeon exists in various forms, including pilsabon (handwritten), banggakbon (woodblock printing), and hwaljabon (metal-type printing) editions. There is not much difference between the stories in the different editions. Woodblock print editions are all wanpanbon, or editions printed in the Jeonju area. Handwritten editions include those written in Chinese characters. The metal-type print editions of Yu Chungryeol-jeon have been published over 20 times and is the second most printed book after Jo Ung-jeon, which attests to its popularity at the time it was written.
