= Kuy language =

Language of Southeast Asia

Kuy
- Kui, Kuay, Cuoi
- กูย, កួយ, ກູຢ
- Native to: Thailand, Laos, Cambodia
- Ethnicity: Kuy
- Native speakers: c. 450,000 (2005–2006)
- Language family: Austroasiatic: Katuic; West Katuic; Kuy
- Writing system: Thai, Khmer, Lao (depends on countries they live)

Language codes
- ISO 639-3: Either: kdt – Kuy (Kuay) nyl – Nyeu (Yoe)
- Glottolog: kuys1235
- ELP: Nyeu
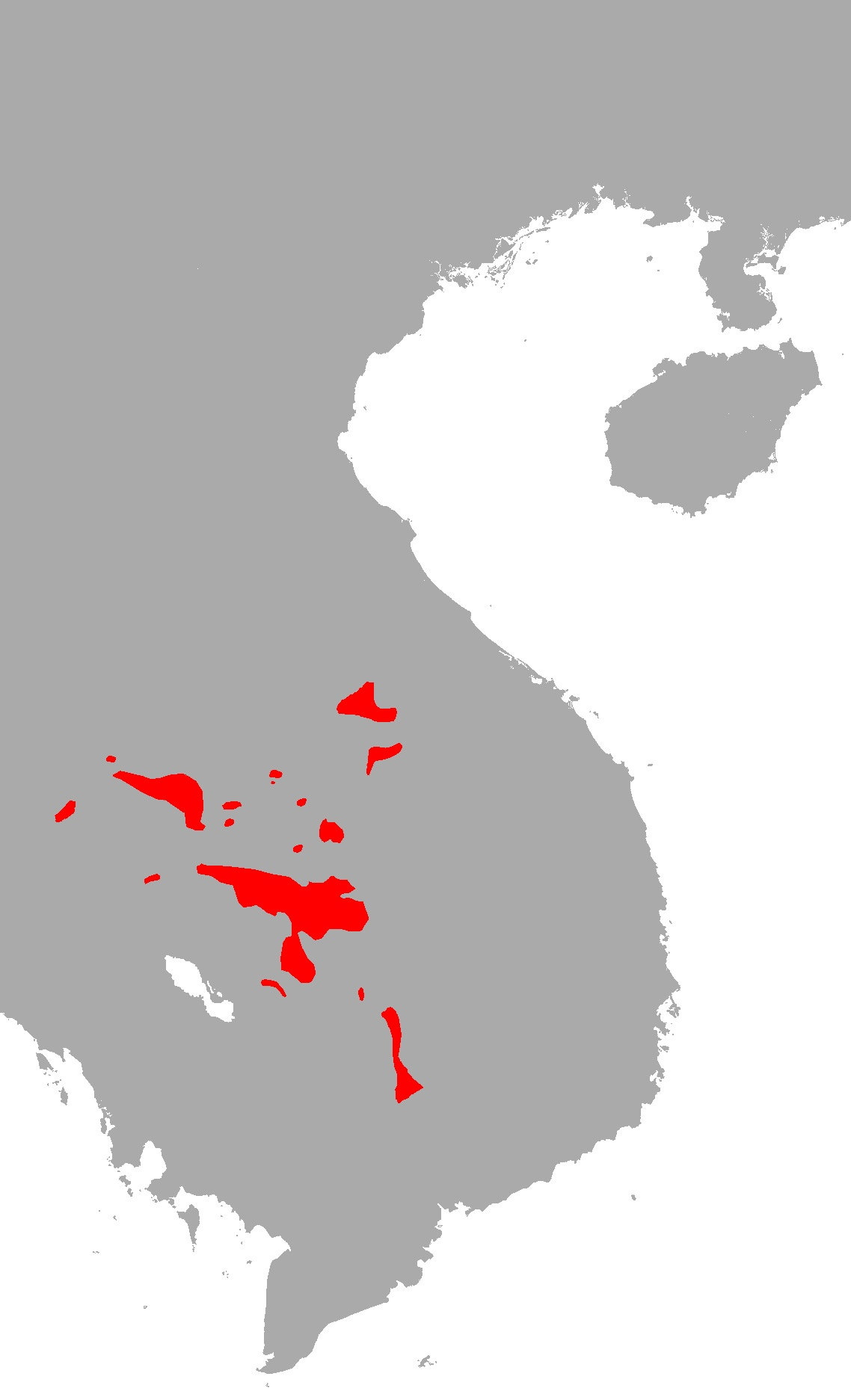

Kuy, also known as Kui, Suay or Kuay (Thai: ภาษากูย; Khmer: ភាសាកួយ), is a Katuic language, part of the larger Austroasiatic family spoken by the Kuy people of Southeast Asia.

Kuy is one of the Katuic languages within the Austroasiatic family. It is spoken in Isan, Thailand by about 300,000 people, in Salavan, Savannakhet and Sekong Provinces of Laos by about 64,000; and in Preah Vihear, Stung Treng and Kampong Thom Provinces of northern Cambodia by 15,500 people.

== Names ==
Spelling variants and varieties include the following (Sidwell 2005:11).

- Kui
- Kuy
- Kuay
- Koay
- Souei. The term "Souei" is also applied to other groups, such as a Pearic community in Cambodia.
- Yeu
- Nanhang
- Kouy

== Dialects ==
Van der haak & Woykos (1987–1988) identified two major Kui varieties in Surin and Sisaket provinces of eastern Thailand, Kuuy and Kuay. Van der haak & Woykos also identified the following divergent Kui varieties in Sisaket Province, Thailand.

- Kui Nhə: Sisaket District (10 villages), Phraibung District (5 villages), Rasisalai District (4 villages). About 8,000 people.
- Kui Nthaw (Kui M'ai): Rasisalai District (5 villages), Uthumphornphisai District (9 villages). All villages mixed with Lao/Isaan.
- Kui Preu Yai: Prue Yai Subdistrict, Khukhan District.

Mann & Markowski (2005) reported the following four Kuy dialects spoken in north-central Cambodia.

- Ntua
- Ntra: includes the subdialects of Auk and Wa
- Mla: 567 speakers in the single village of Krala Peas, Choam Ksan District, Preah Vihear Province
- "Thmei"

A variety of Kui/Kuy called Nyeu (ɲə) is spoken in the villages of Ban Phon Kho, Ban Khamin, Ban Nonkat, Ban Phon Palat, and Ban Prasat Nyeu in Sisaket Province, Thailand. The Nyeu of Ban Phon Kho claim that their ancestors had migrated from Muang Khong, Amphoe Rasisalai, Sisaket Province.

In Buriram Province, Kuy is spoken in the 4 districts of Nong Ki, Prakhon Chai, Lam Plai Mat, and Nong Hong (Sa-ing Sangmeen 1992:14). Within Nong Ki District, Kuy villages are located in the southern part of Yoei Prasat (เย้ยปราสาท) Subdistrict and in the western part of Mueang Phai (เมืองไผ่) Subdistrict (Sa-ing Sangmeen 1992:16).

== Phonology ==
The following is the phonology of the Kui (Surin) language:

=== Consonants ===
		Labial	Alveolar	Palatal	Velar	Glottal
Plosive/ Affricate	voiceless	p	t	tɕ	k	ʔ
Plosive/ Affricate	aspirated	pʰ	tʰ	tɕʰ	kʰ	ʔ
Plosive/ Affricate	voiced	b	d	dʑ		ʔ
Nasal		m	n	ɲ	ŋ	
Fricative		f	s			h
Liquid	rhotic		r			
Liquid	lateral		l			
Glide		w		j		

=== Vowels ===
	Front	Central	Back
Close	i iː	ɯ ɯː	u uː
Close-mid	e eː	ɤ ɤː	o oː
Open-mid	ɛ ɛː	ʌ ʌː	ɔ ɔː
Open		a aː	ɑ ɑː

Vowel sounds may also be distinguished using breathy voice:

Breathy vowels
	Front	Central	Back
Close	i̤ i̤ː	ɯ̤ ɯ̤ː	ṳ ṳː
Close-mid	e̤ e̤ː	ɤ̤ ɤ̤ː	o̤ o̤ː
Open-mid	ɛ̤ ɛ̤ː	ʌ̤ ʌ̤ː	ɔ̤ ɔ̤ː
Open		a̤ a̤ː	ɑ̤ ɑ̤ː

== Locations ==
The following list of Kuy village locations in Sisaket Province is from Van der haak & Woykos (1987–1988:129). Asterisks (placed before village names) denote ethnically mixed villages, in which ethnic Kuy reside with ethnic Lao or Khmer.

=== Kui Nhə ===
- Mueang District เมือง
  - Tambon Phonkho โพนค้อ: Phonkho โพนค้อ, Nong, Yanang, Klang, Non
  - Tambon Thum ทุ่ม: Khamin
- Phayu District พยุห์
  - Tambon Phayu พยุห์: *Nongthum
  - Tambon Phromsawat พรหมสวัสดิ์: Samrong, Khothaw
  - Tambon Nongphek โนนเพ็ก: *Khokphek โคกเพ็ก
- Phraibung District ไพรบึง
  - Tambon Prasatyae ปราสาทเยอ: Prasatyaenua ปราสาทเยอเหนือ, Prasatyaetai ปราสาทเยอใต้, Khawaw, Phonpalat, Cangun
- Rasisalai District ราษีไศล
  - Tambon Mueangkhong เมืองคง: Yai ใหญ่
- Sila Lat District ศิลาลาด
  - Tambon Kung กุง: Kung กุง, Muangkaw เมืองเก่า, *Chok

=== Kui Nthaw/M'ai ===
All Kui Nthaw/M'ai live in mixed villages.

- Rasisalai District ราษีไศล
  - Tambon Nong Ing หนองอึ่ง: *Tongton, *Huai Yai ห้วยใหญ่, *Dnmuang, *Kokeow, *Hang
- Uthumphornphisai District อุทุมพรพิสัย
  - Tambon Khaem แขม: *Phanong, *Sangthong, *Sawai, *Nongphae, *Phae
- Pho Si Suwan District โพธิ์ศรีสุวรรณ
  - Tambon Naengma หนองม้า: *Nongma หนองม้า, *Songhong, *Songleng, *Nongphae

=== Kuay Prue Yai ===
- Khukhan District ขุขันธ์
  - Tambon Prueyai ปรือใหญ่: Preu Yai, Makham, Pruekhan, and village no.12

== See also ==
- Ethnic groups in Cambodia
- List of ethnic groups in Laos
- Ethnic groups in Thailand
