= Pacoh people =

Ethnic group

Pacoh
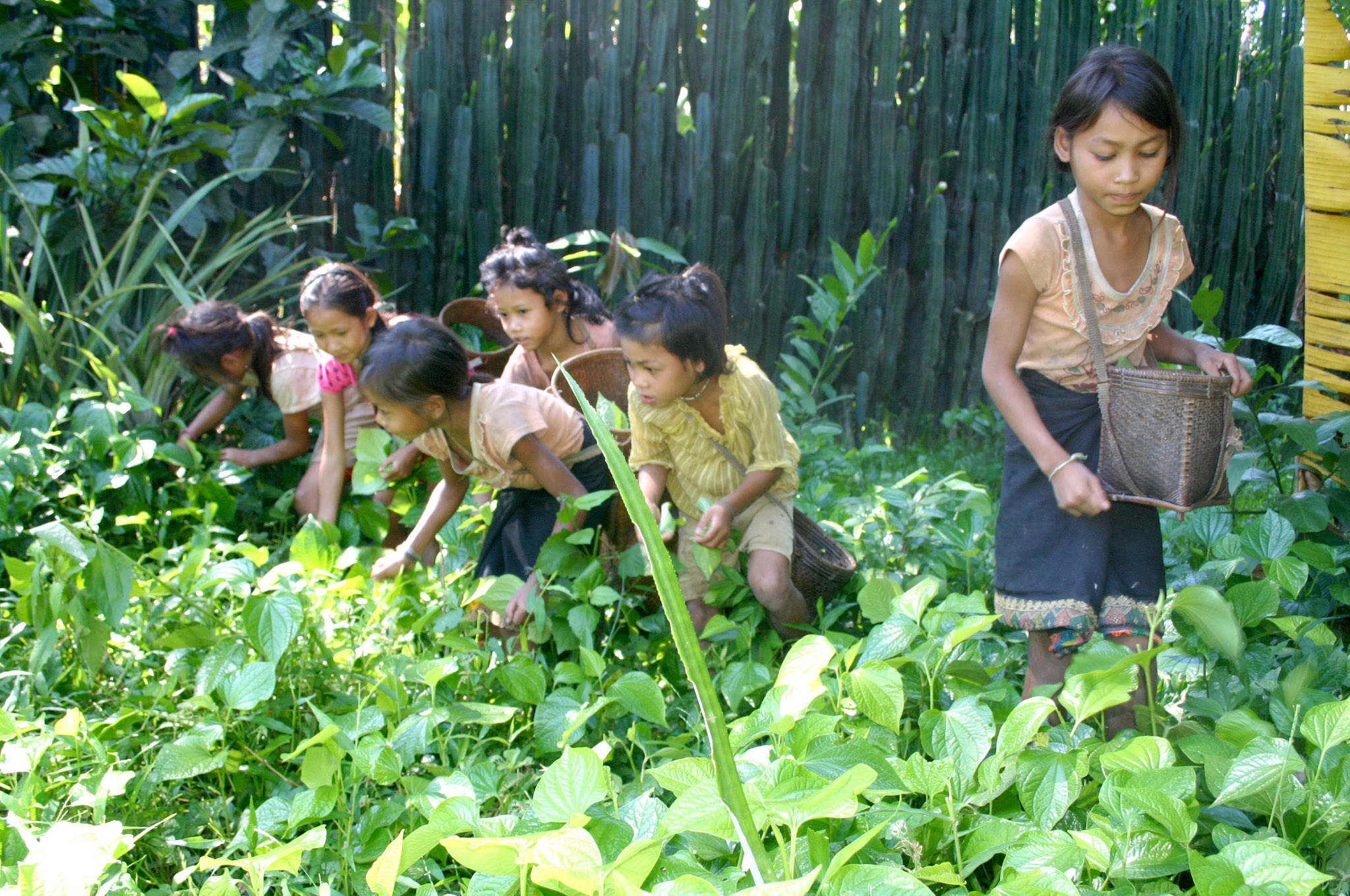
- Pacoh children in Laos

Total population
- 22,640 (Laos, 2015)

Regions with significant populations
- Laos, Vietnam

Languages
- Pacoh, others

Religion
- Animism

The Pacoh are a minority ethnic group, part of the Katuic peoples.

== Etymology ==
The name Pacoh may mean 'mountaineers'. Alternate names for Pacoh are: Bo, Pako, and Van Kieu.

== Distribution ==
They live mostly in an extremely remote mountainous area of Laos, near the Vietnam border. There are approximately 17,000 Pacoh in Laos, and approximately 35,000 Pacoh worldwide.

In Laos, the Pacoh live in the northern portion of Saravan Province (Sa Mouay District) and the southern portion of Savannakhet Province (Nong District).

Other Pacoh live in Vietnam where they are considered a part of the Ta Oi minority. In Vietnam, the Pacoh (Khas Pakho) number approximately 15,000 (1973) and are found in the highlands of Huế.

== Industry ==
Their main industry is slash-and-burn agriculture.

== Religion ==
Most Pacoh are animists. They pray to many gods, ghosts and deities. Every village has a spirit-house on its outskirts.

== Language ==
Pacoh speak the Pacoh language.
