= Katu language =

Katuic language spoken in Southeast Asia

Katu
- Low Katu, West Katu
- Native to: Laos, Central Vietnam
- Ethnicity: Katu
- Native speakers: 23,000 (2005 census)
- Language family: Austroasiatic: Katuic; Katu languages; Katu
- Dialects: Triw; Dakkang; Kantu; Kalum
- Writing system: Lao (Laos), Latin (Vietnam)

Language codes
- ISO 639-3: kuf
- Glottolog: west2398
- ELP: Dakkang
- Triw

Katu, or Low Katu, is a Katuic language of eastern Laos and central Vietnam.

In Vietnam, it is spoken in Huế city, including in A Lưới district. According to the 2009 Vietnamese census, there are 61,588 Katu people.

== Phonology ==
=== Consonants ===
		Labial	Alveolar	Palatal	Velar	Glottal
Plosive	voiceless	p	t	c	k	ʔ
Plosive	aspirated	pʰ	tʰ	cʰ	kʰ	
Plosive	voiced	b	d	ɟ	ɡ	
Plosive	implosive	ɓ	ɗ	ʄ		
Nasal		m	n	ɲ	ŋ	
Liquid	rhotic		r			
Liquid	lateral		l			
Fricative			(s)			h
Approximant		w		j		

- /ʄ/ can also be heard as a preglottal affricate sound [ʔdʒ] or glide [ʔj].
- /cʰ/ can range to an alveolar fricative [s].

=== Vowels ===
	Front	Central	Back
Close	i iː	ɨ ɨː	u uː
Close-mid	e eː	ə əː	o oː
Open-mid	ɛ ɛː	ʌ ʌː	ɔ ɔː
Open		a aː	ɒ ɒː

- Diphthongs occur as /ia, ɨa, ua/.
