= Pacoh language =

Katuic language spoken in Laos and Vietnam

Pacoh
- Native to: Laos, Vietnam
- Ethnicity: Pacoh
- Native speakers: 32,000 (2002–2005)
- Language family: Austroasiatic: Katuic; Pacoh

Language codes
- ISO 639-3: pac
- Glottolog: paco1243

The Pacoh language is a member of the Katuic language group, a part of the Eastern Mon–Khmer linguistic branch. Most Pacoh speakers live in central Laos and central Vietnam. Pacoh is undergoing substantial change, influenced by the Vietnamese.

Alternative names are Paco, Pokoh, Bo River Van Kieu. Its dialects are Pahi (Ba-Hi). They are officially classified by the Vietnamese government as Ta'Oi (Tà Ôi) people.

== Phonology ==
=== Consonants ===
		Labial	Alveolar	Palatal	Velar	Glottal
Nasal		m	n	ɲ	ŋ	
Plosive	voiceless	p	t	c	k	ʔ
Plosive	aspirated	pʰ	tʰ		kʰ	ʔ
Plosive	voiced	b	d	ɟ		ʔ
Fricative				ʃ		h
Trill			r			
Approximant	plain	w	l	j		
Approximant	postglottal	wʔ		jʔ		

- Only /ɲ/, but not other nasals, occurs in presyllables before /c, ʃ, ɲ/.
- /w/ may be lenited as voiced dental fricative [v] in initial positions.
- Syllable finals /ŋ/ and /k/ are realized as labialized [ŋʷ], [kʷ] after [-RTR] back round vowels /o/ and /u/.

=== Vowels ===
Vowels (Sidwell 2003):

Pacoh has six vowel qualities, all of which occur long and short, in modal and creaky voice. Creaky vowels are lowered compared to modally voiced vowels. There are three diphthongs which also occur modal and creaky. Unlike other languages in the area, vowel phonation does not seem to have originated in the phonation of preceding consonants.

Monophthongs
	front	central	back
High modal	i iː	ɨ ɨː	u uː
Low modal	e eː	ə əː	o oː
High creaky	ḛ ḛː	ə̰ ə̰ː	o̰ o̰ː
Low creaky	ɛ̰ ɛ̰ː	a̰ a̰ː	ɔ̰ ɔ̰ː

Diphthongs
	front	central	back
Modal	iə	ɨə	uə
Creaky	ḛa	ə̰a	o̰a

== Grammar ==
Pacoh Pronouns
	1st person			2nd person			3rd person		
	singular	dual	plural	singular	dual	plural	singular	dual	plural
General	kɨ:	ɲaŋ	dɔ:	ʔmmaj	ʔiɲa:	ʔaɲa:	hɛ:	ʔipɛ:	ʔapɛ:
Genitive	ʔɳkɨ:	ʔɲɲaŋ	ʔndɔ:	ʔmmaj	ʔndɔ:-ʔiɲa:	ʔndɔ:-ʔaɲa:	ʔŋhɛ:	ʔndɔ:-ʔipɛ:	ʔndɔ:-ʔapɛ:
Dative	ʔakɨ:	ʔaɲaŋ	ʔadɔ:	ʔamaj	ʔadɔ:-ʔiɲa:	ʔadɔ:-ʔaɲa:	ʔahɛ:	ʔadɔ:-ʔipɛ:	ʔadɔ:-ʔapɛ:

Pacoh is an analytic SVO language with six parts of speech—including verbs, nouns, prepositions, adverbs, conjunctions, and sentence particles, all variably depend on each other in syntactic relationship, and five important grammatical cases—nominative, accusative, dative, locative, predicative. There are no markers for the nominative and accusative cases, and word order is relied on to distinguish them instead.

Jǫ:n ʔakɨ: ʃac maj
give DAT-1SG book 2SG
"Give me your book."

dɔ: pe:ŋ ʔa-ceʔ daŋ tumiəŋ
NOM-1PL shoot ACC-bird means crossbow
"I shot the bird with crossbow."

The predicative case marks a noun dependent on noun, usually common nouns, extension relator nouns, and demonstrative nouns.

ʔnkǫ:ŋ ʔən ʔiəw ʔnkoh
man that old that-PRED
"That old man."
