= Jo Ung jeon =

Korean novel

Jo Ung jeon (Korean: 조웅전; Hanja: 趙雄傳; lit. The Tale of Jo Ung) is a classic Korean heroic novel. The protagonist, Jo Ung, suffers hardships in his childhood but eventually achieves great honor in battles owing to the help of various supporters and saves the nation in crisis. Jo Ung’s heroic actions are emphasized in this story, which is known to be one of the most-read heroic novels in the late Joseon dynasty alongside Yu Chungryeol jeon.

== Authorship ==
The author of Jo Ung jeon is unknown, and it is estimated to have been written in the late Joseon dynasty. It is generally believed that this novel was written by a yangban (people of well-educated scholarly class) of lower status or jungin (a privileged class of commoners). Among the various existing copies of the book, the oldest is from 1857, which implies that Jo Ung jeon was widely read prior to the mid-19th century at the latest.

== Plot ==
During the reign of Emperor Wen of China’s Liu Song dynasty, Prime Minister Jo Jeongin renders distinguished services but ends up committing suicide after being falsely accused by Yi Dubyeong. When the emperor continues to miss Prime Minister Jo and cherishes his son, Jo Ung, Yi tries to harm Jo. After the emperor dies, Yi sends the crown prince on an exile and usurps the throne. Enraged, Jo writes a manifesto criticizing Yi and calling him a traitor and posts it on the streets, and Jo and his mother ends up on the run from the wrath of Yi.

While Jo and his mother were roaming the street in disguise, hiding from Yi and begging for food, a Buddhist monk named Wolgyeong leads the two to Gangseonam. There, Jo Ung studies under Wolgyeong and receives a sword—the Sword of Jo Ung—from an old man in the market. Later on, Jo learns martial arts and military tactics from Cheolgwan from Gwansan and gains a swift horse (yongma, literally "dragon horse"), assuming the qualities of a hero who will save a country from difficult times.

After all the training, Jo Ung leaves to go see his mother. On the way to see her, he stays at the house of a government official surnamed Jang, where he promises to marry his daughter, Lady Jang, in the future. Upon returning from the visit to his mother, Jo follows Cheolgwan's advice and wins the war against Seobeon, saving the State of Wei from a crisis.

Meanwhile, Ganghojasa, who has been looking to remarry after his wife died, hears about the beauty of Lady Jang and attempts to force her to marry him. Lady Jang runs away, and Ganghojasa imprisons her mother. On his way to see the exiled crown prince, Jo Ung learns what happened to Lady Jang and punishes Ganghojasa. He then takes Lady Jang’s mother to Gangseonam, where he reunites with his mother and Lady Jang with her mother. Jo Ung takes off again, arriving just before the crown prince drinks the poison given by the order of the emperor. Jo rescues the crown prince and his faithful servants and returns to Wei. In an alliance with the King of Wei, Jo attacks the Imperial City, and Yi attempts to thwart him by sending the troops but ends up failing. Yi’s men try to escape from the crisis by handing Yi and his family over to Jo, but Jo Ung kills Yi and all of his men in the presence of the crown prince. Later, Jo Ung becomes the king of a small region, where he rules with benevolence and lives happily ever after (Wanpan edition with 104 pages).

== Features and significance ==
Jo Ung jeon is a representative heroic novel from the late Joseon dynasty. It was the most published novel among the existing woodblock-print (panggakbon) novels that have been passed down to today, which shows that it was one of the most loved novels of the time. It is also a typical work of fiction that shows the trend of heroic novels and the way readers enjoyed novels in late Joseon.

Heroic novels often feature the heroic exploits of the protagonists in wars and as a result they are also known as war story (gundam) novels. Depending on the materials, heroic novels are divided into two large groups: creative heroic novels and historical heroic novels. Creative heroic novels are works of complete fiction with fictional characters and events, while historical heroic novels feature real historical figures alongside fictional characters against the backdrop of historical incidents, such as the Imjin War (Japanese invasions of Joseon Korea) or the Qing invasion of Joseon. Creative heroic novels, such as Jo Ung jeon, tend to be set in China, and the main plot involves an invasion of an enemy and a war that quells the insurrection of villainous subjects. Jo Ung jeon, in particular, achieved a high dramatic tension by making the main villain who usurps the power of the emperor also the protagonist’s personal enemy who killed the protagonist’s father. Jo Ung jeon is based on the structure of the "life story of a hero", but it does not contain the portion about the parents praying for a child or having a birth dream prior to the protagonist’s birth. Moreover, while other protagonists tend to be reincarnations of the people of the heavenly realm with superpowers, Jo Ung shapes his own destiny with the help of ascetics who are masters in different sets of skills, spirits, and other superhuman beings. Also, the fact that Jo Ung and Lady Jang promise to wed without the meddling of the parents is considered to show a sense of "free love", going against the marriage customs of the time.

== Texts ==
There are over 80 editions of Jo Ung jeon today, including about 20 editions of woodblock prints, 50 editions of handwritten scripts, and 10 editions of metal-type prints. The earliest version of the novel was published in 1857 and contains the name of the engraver (who creates woodblock prints), which is significant as it is the only novel that shows the name of an engraver. Among the existing copies of Jo Ung jeon, the "Wanpan" version (printed in present-day Jeonju) with 104 pages consists of three volumes and is considered more detailed and consistent compared to other editions.
