= Bru language =

Mon–Khmer dialect continuum of Southeast Asia

Bru
- Bruu
- Native to: Laos, Vietnam, Thailand
- Ethnicity: Bru, Katang
- Native speakers: (300,000 cited 1991–2006)
- Language family: Austroasiatic: Katuic; West; Brou–So; Bru
- Writing system: Latin, Lao, Thai

Language codes
- ISO 639-3: Variously: bru – Eastern Bru brv – Western Bru sss – Sô xhv – Khua ncq – Northern Katang sct – Southern Katang
- Glottolog: brou1236

Bruu (also spelled Bru, B'ru, Baru, Brou) is a Mon–Khmer dialect continuum spoken by the Bru people of mainland Southeast Asia. Sô and Khua are dialects.

== Names ==
There are various local and dialect designations for Bru (Sidwell 2005:11).

- So ~ Sô
- Tri (So Tri, Chali)
- Van Kieu
- Leu ~ Leung (Kaleu)
- Galler
- Khua
- Katang (not the same as Kataang)

== Distribution ==
The distribution of the Bru language spreads north and northeast from Salavan, Laos, through Savannakhet, Khammouane, and Bolikhamsai, and over into neighboring Thailand and Vietnam (Sidwell 2005:11). In Vietnam, Brâu (Braò) is spoken in Đắk Mế, Bờ Y commune, Đắk Tô District, Kon Tum Province.

== Dialects ==
Thailand has the following Western Bru dialects (Choo, et al. 2012).

- Bru Khok Sa-at of Phang Khon District and Phanna Nikhom District, Sakon Nakhon Province
- Bru Woen Buek of Woen Buek (Wyn Buek), Ubon Ratchathani Province (more similar to Katang)
- Bru Dong Luang of Dong Luang District, Mukdahan Province

The following Bru subgroups are found in Quảng Bình Province (Phan 1998).

- Vân Kiêu: 5,500 persons in Lệ Thủy District and Vĩnh Linh District (in Quảng Trị Province)
- Măng Coong: 600 persons in Bố Trạch District
- Tri: 300 persons in Bố Trạch District
- Khùa: 1,000 persons in Tuyên Hóa District

Below is a comparative vocabulary of Vân Kiêu, Măng Coong, Tri, and Khùa from Phan (1998:479-480), with words transcribed in Vietnamese orthography.

Gloss	Vân Kiêu	Măng Coong	Tri	Khùa	Vietnamese
one	mui	muôi			một
two	bar				hai
three	pei				ba
four	pon				bốn
five	shăng		t'shăng		năm
hair	sok				tóc
eye	mat				mắt
nose	lyu	mu			mũi
sky	plang			giang	trời
ground	kute	katek		k'tek	đất
water	dơ			do	nước
fish	sia				cá
bird	cham				chim
water buffalo	trick				trâu
cattle	ntro	tro			bò

== Phonology ==
=== Consonants ===
The consonant sounds in both East and West dialects consist of the following:

		Labial	Alveolar	Palatal	Velar	Glottal
Plosive/ Affricate	voiceless	p	t	tɕ	k	ʔ
Plosive/ Affricate	aspirated	pʰ	tʰ		kʰ	
Plosive/ Affricate	voiced	b	d			
Nasal		m	n	ɲ	ŋ	
Liquid	rhotic		r			
Liquid	lateral		l			
Fricative		w	s			h
Approximant		w		j		

- /w/ is typically pronounced as labiodental fricative [v] or approximant [ʋ] when occurring in initial position. In final position, it is always heard as [w].
- /r/ can be heard as either a trill [r] or a tap [ɾ].
- /tʰr/ as a consonant cluster, can be phonetically heard as [tʰɹ̥] in the Western dialect.
- /h/ can also be heard as a voiced glottal [ɦ] when a preceding a breathy vowel sound in the Western Bru dialects. It can also be heard as nasal [h̃] when preceding a nasal vowel in the Western dialects.

Final consonants
		Labial	Alveolar	Palatal	Velar	Glottal
Plosive		p	t		k	ʔ
Nasal		m	n		ŋ	
Fricative						h
Rhotic			r			
Approximant	plain	w	l	j		
Approximant	aspirated	wʰ		jʰ		
Approximant	glottalized	wˀ		jˀ		

- Plosive sounds /p, t, k/ in final position are heard as unreleased [p̚, t̚, k̚].

=== Vowels ===
	Front	Central		Back
Close	i iː	ɨ ɨː		u uː
Close-mid	e eː	ə əː		o oː
Open-mid	ɛ ɛː	ɜ ɜː		ɔ ɔː
Open		a aː	ɒ̈ ɒ̈ː	

Vowels in the Western Bru dialect
	Front	Central		Back	
Close	i iː			ɯ ɯː	u uː
Close-mid	e eː			ɤ ɤː	o oː
Open-mid	ɛ ɛː			ʌ ʌː	ɔ ɔː
Open		a aː	ɒ̈ ɒ̈ː		

==== Breathy vowels ====
Vowel sounds may also be distinguished using breathy voice:

Breathy vowels
	Front	Central		Back
Close	i̤ i̤ː	ɨ̤ ɨ̤ː		ṳ ṳː
Close-mid	e̤ e̤ː	ə̤ ə̤ː		o̤ o̤ː
Open-mid	ɛ̤ ɛ̤ː	ɜ̤ ɜ̤ː		ɔ̤ ɔ̤ː
Open		a̤ a̤ː	ɒ̤̈ ɒ̤̈ː	

Breathy vowels in the Western Bru dialect
	Front	Central		Back	
Close	i̤ i̤ː			ɯ̤ ɯ̤ː	ṳ ṳː
Close-mid	e̤ e̤ː			ɤ̤ ɤ̤ː	o̤ o̤ː
Open-mid	ɛ̤ ɛ̤ː			ʌ̤ ʌ̤ː	ɔ̤ ɔ̤ː
Open		a̤ a̤ː	ɒ̤̈ ɒ̤̈ː		

==== Nasal vowels ====
Nasal vowel sounds may occur in the Western Bru dialect:

Nasal vowels in the Western Bru dialect
	Front	Central		Back	
Close	ĩː			ɯ̃	ũ ũː
Open-mid	ɛ̃ ɛ̃ː			ʌ̃ː	ɔ̃ ɔ̃ː
Open		ã ãː	ɒ̈̃ ɒ̈̃ː		
