= Katuic languages =

Subgroup of the Austroasiatic language family

Katuic
- Geographic distribution: Indochina
- Ethnicity: Katuic peoples
- Linguistic classification: Austroasiatic: Katuic
- Proto-language: Proto-Katuic
- Subdivisions: Katu; Kui–Bru (West); Pacoh; Ta'Oi–Kriang

Language codes
- Glottolog: katu1271
- Katuic

The fifteen Katuic languages form a branch of the Austroasiatic languages spoken by about 1.5 million people in Southeast Asia. People who speak Katuic languages are called the Katuic peoples. Paul Sidwell notes that Austroasiatic/Mon–Khmer languages are lexically more similar to Katuic and Bahnaric the closer they are geographically. He says this geographic similarity is independent of which branch of the family each language belongs to. He also says Katuic and Bahnaric do not have any shared innovations, so they do not form a single branch of the Austroasiatic family, but form separate branches.

== Classification ==
In 1966, a lexicostatistical analysis of various Austroasiatic languages in Mainland Southeast Asia was performed by Summer Institute of Linguistics linguists David Thomas and Richard Phillips. This study resulted in the recognition of two distinct new subbranches of Austroasiatic, namely Katuic and Bahnaric (Sidwell 2009). Sidwell (2005) casts doubt on Diffloth's Vieto-Katuic hypothesis, saying that the evidence is ambiguous, and that it is not clear where Katuic belongs in the family. Sufficient data for use in the sub-classification of the Katuic languages only become available after the opening of Laos to foreign researchers in the 1990s.

=== Sidwell (2005) ===
The sub-classification of Katuic below was proposed by Sidwell (2005). Additionally, Sidwell (2009) analyzes the Katu branch as the most conservative subgroup of Katuic.

- West Katuic branch:
  - Kuy languages:
    - Kuy, Souei
  - Bru languages:
    - Bru, So, etc.
- Ta'Oi branch:
  - Ta'Oi, Katang, Talan/Ong/Ir/Inh
  - Kriang/Ngeq
- Katu branch:
  - Katu, Phuong, Kantu, Triw, Dak Kang
- Pacoh branch:
  - Pacoh

=== Gehrmann (2019) ===
Gehrmann (2019) proposes the following classification of the Katuic languages.

Proto-Katuic

- Proto-West Katuic
  - Kuay languages
  - Bru languages
- Proto-Pacoh-Ta'oi
  - Ta'oi languages
  - Pacoh languages
- Kriang languages
- Katu languages

Ethnologue also lists Kassang (the Tariang language), but that is a Bahnaric language (Sidwell 2003). Lê, et al. (2014:294) reports a Katu subgroup called Ba-hi living in mountainous areas of Phong Điền District, Vietnam, but Watson (1996:197) speaks of "Pacoh Pahi" as a Pacoh variety.

Kuy and Bru each have around half a million speakers, while the Ta’Oi cluster has around 200,000 speakers.

== Proto-language ==
Reconstructions of Proto-Katuic, or its sub-branches, include:

- Thomas (1967): A Phonology Reconstruction of Proto-East-Katuic
- Diffloth (1982): Registres, devoisement, timbres vocaliques: leur histoire en katouique
- Efinov (1983): Problemy fonologicheskoj rekonstrukcii proto-katuicheskogo jazyka
- Peiros (1996): Katuic Comparative Dictionary
- Therapahan L-Thongkum (2001): Languages of the Tribes in Xekong Province, Southern Laos
- Paul Sidwell (2005): The Katuic languages: classification, reconstruction and comparative lexicon

Sidwell (2005) reconstructs the consonant inventory of proto-Katuic as follows:

		Labial	Alveolar	Palatal	Velar	Glottal
Plosive	voiceless	*p	*t	*c	*k	*ʔ
Plosive	voiced	*b	*d	*ɟ	*ɡ	
Plosive	implosive	*ɓ	*ɗ	*ʄ		
Nasal		*m	*n	*ɲ	*ŋ	
Liquid		*w	*l, *r	*j		
Fricative			*s			*h

This is identical to reconstructions of proto-Austroasiatic except for *ʄ, which is better preserved in the Katuic languages than in other branches of Austro-Asiatic, and which Sidwell believes was also present in Proto-Mon Khmer.

== Lexical isoglosses ==
Paul Sidwell (2015:185–186) lists the following lexical innovations unique to Katuic that had replaced original Proto-Austroasiatic forms.

Gloss	Proto-Katuic	Proto-Austroasiatic
wife	*kɗial	*kdɔːr
year	*kmɔɔ	*cnam
cobra	*duur	*ɟaːt
mushroom	*trɨa	*psit
bone	*ʔŋhaaŋ	*cʔaːŋ
six	*tbat	*tpraw
eight	*tgɔɔl	*thaːm
head	*pləə	*b/ɓuːk; *kuːj

Sidwell (2015:173) lists the following lexical isoglosses shared between Katuic and Bahnaric.

Gloss	Proto-Katuic	Proto-Bahnaric	Notes
bark of tree	*ʔnɗɔh	*kɗuh	
claw/nail	*knrias	*krʔniəh	cf. Khmer kiəh 'to scratch'
skin	*ʔŋkar	*ʔəkaːr	
to stand up	*dɨk	*dɨk	may be borrowed from Chamic
tree/wood	*ʔalɔːŋ	*ʔlɔːŋ	cf. Proto-Khmuic *cʔɔːŋ
crossbow	*pnaɲ	*pnaɲ	cf. Old Mon pnaɲ 'army'
horn	*ʔakiː	*ʔəkɛː	
palm, sole	*trpaːŋ	*-paːŋ	
salt	*bɔːh	*bɔh	
to steal	*toŋ	*toŋ	
ten	*ɟit	*cit	

Furthermore, Gerard Diffloth (1992) lists the words 'centipede', 'bone', 'to cough', 'to fart', 'to breathe', and 'blood' as isoglosses shared between Katuic and Vietic. A Vieto-Katuic connection has also been proposed by Alves (2005).

== See also ==
- List of Proto-Katuic reconstructions (Wiktionary)
