= Bru people =

Ethnic group

Bru-Vân Kiều
Bru
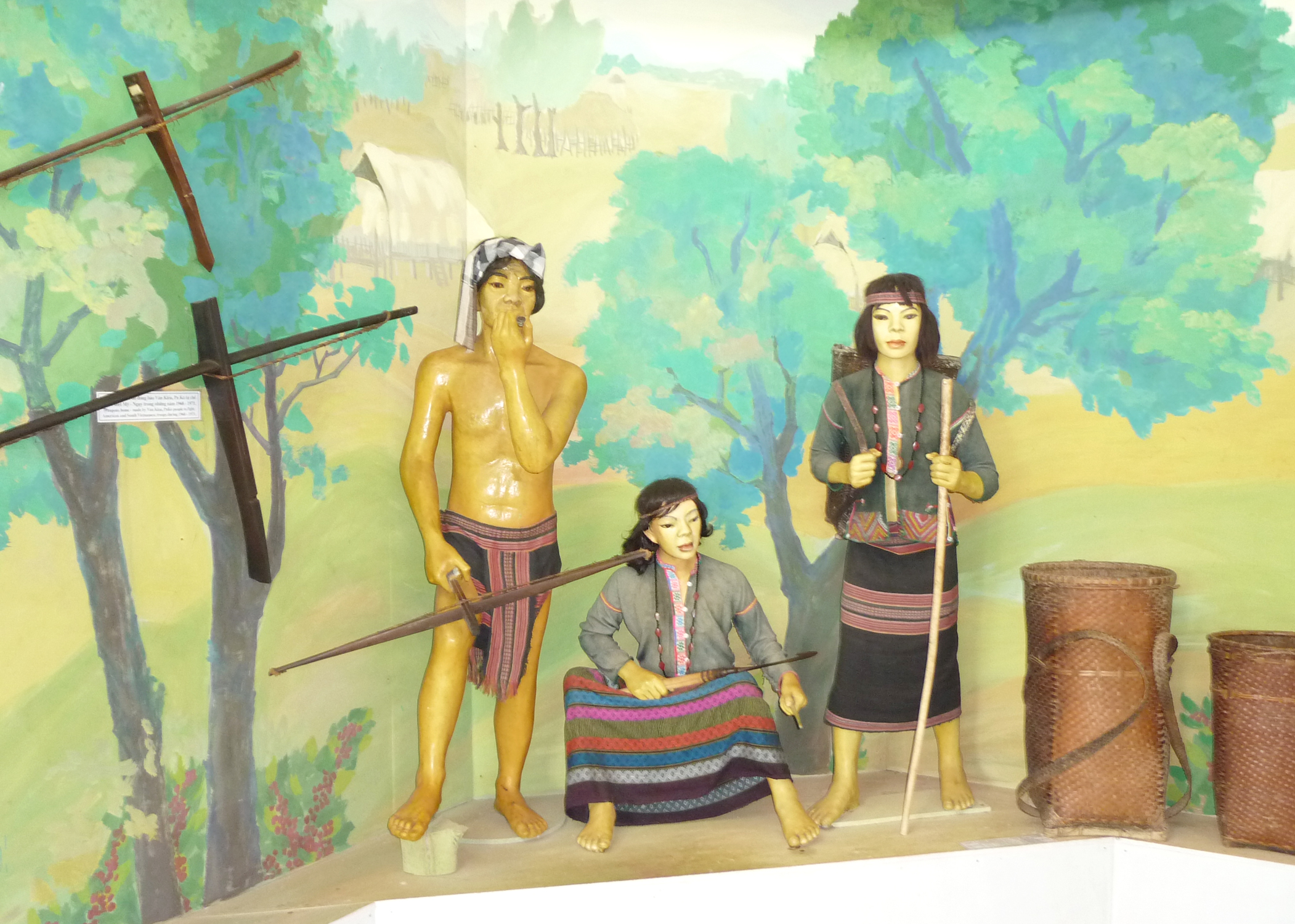
- Diorama showing wax figures of Bru people in traditional attire, Khe Sanh museum

Total population
- 129,559 (1999 estimate)

Regions with significant populations
- Vietnam: 94,598 (2019)
- Laos: 69,000
- Thailand: 25,000

Languages
- Eastern Bru, Western Bru, Vietnamese, Lao, Thai

Religion
- Traditional religion (ancestor worship), Animism, Theravada Buddhism

Related ethnic groups
- Katuic peoples

The Bru (also Bruu, or Bru-Vân Kiều; Vietnamese: Người Bru - Vân Kiều; Lao: ບຣູ; Thai: บรู; which literally means "people living in the woods") are an indigenous ethnic group living in Thailand, Laos, and Vietnam. They speak a Katuic language, unlike the Brao, who speak a Western Bahnaric language. The Bru are not found in northeastern Cambodia. The Lun, Kreung, Kavet, Amba and Brao Tanap groups in northeastern Cambodia are actually sub-groups of the Brao, not the Bru. The Brao sub-groups in Laos are the Lun, Kavet, Jree, Ka-ying, and the Hamong.

The Bru are also close ethnically to Pnongam peoples of Southern Vietnam and Eastern Cambodia. Despite kinship with this group, the Bru are different politically and historically from this other ethnic group.

The Bru speak Bru, a Katuic Mon–Khmer language, which has several dialects. Their total population is estimated at 129,559 by Ethnologue.

Some people have confused the Bru for the Brao in northeastern Cambodia and Attapeu and Champasak Provinces of southern Laos. In fact, they are different groups, and Bru people are not found in Cambodia.

== Settlements and villages ==
The Bru settled mostly along waterways. Traditionally they live in small houses that are built on stilts. The houses are arranged around a central meeting building around a circle.

In Thailand, most Bru live in Sakon Nakhon Province, and Mukdahan Province in the Isan region of Northeast Thailand.

In Laos, most Bru live in eastern Savannakhet Province, in Sepone District, but also in other parts of the province, and also in Khammouane Province.

In Vietnam, most Bru live in the western mountainous part of Quảng Bình, Quảng Trị, Huế. The Bru sub-groups in Vietnam are Vân Kiều, Trì, Khùa, Ma Coong.

== History ==
The early history of the Bru remains somewhat obscure. Researchers believe that the ancestors of the Bru were members of the kingdom of the Khmers of Angkor which dominated large parts of Cambodia, Laos and Thailand, circa the 9th century and 13th century. This is also based upon the relationship between the Mon-Khmer languages and the Bru. There is common speculation that the Bru and other Mon-Khmer groups were pushed out of valley lands by Thai-speaking peoples migrating from China, but there is no evidence to this effect, as those lands were occupied by Mon and Khmer populations who were distinct linguistically and culturally from the Bru or other Mon-Khmer groups of Laos, who as indigenous people, may have always lived in remote, isolated areas.

A small part of the Bru migrated from Annamite Range (Vietnamese: dãy Trường Sơn) to Đắk Lắk since late April 1972. In 2019, the Bru population in Đắk Lắk is 2,659 people, more crowded than their population in Thừa Thiên–Huế (1,389 people).

During the Vietnam War, the Bru suffered greatly as a result of the conflict that surrounded them.

During and following the Vietnam War the Bru people in Thailand were heavily involved in revolutionary activities against the local Thai governments. The Thai central government combated these activities by increasing Thai military presence as well as increasing spending for economic development.

In Vietnam, during the war, the Bru people (called Vân Kiều in Vietnamese language) provided significant support for the movement of Viet Minh and later the People's Republic of Vietnam. They later adopted the surname "Ho" to express their gratitude to President Ho Chi Minh.

== Religion ==
The Bru mainly believe in Animism, but some (especially in Thailand), are adherents of Theravada Buddhism, which is observed along with Animism, which includes worship of ancestors, the spirits of the rice and fire spirits. Sacred objects to the Bru include relics and fragments of ancient weapons and household objects

Also the Bru transmit many myths and legends passed down orally including several stories about animals. These stories portray the most intelligent as the hare, and the hero as the tiger.

== Economy and occupation ==
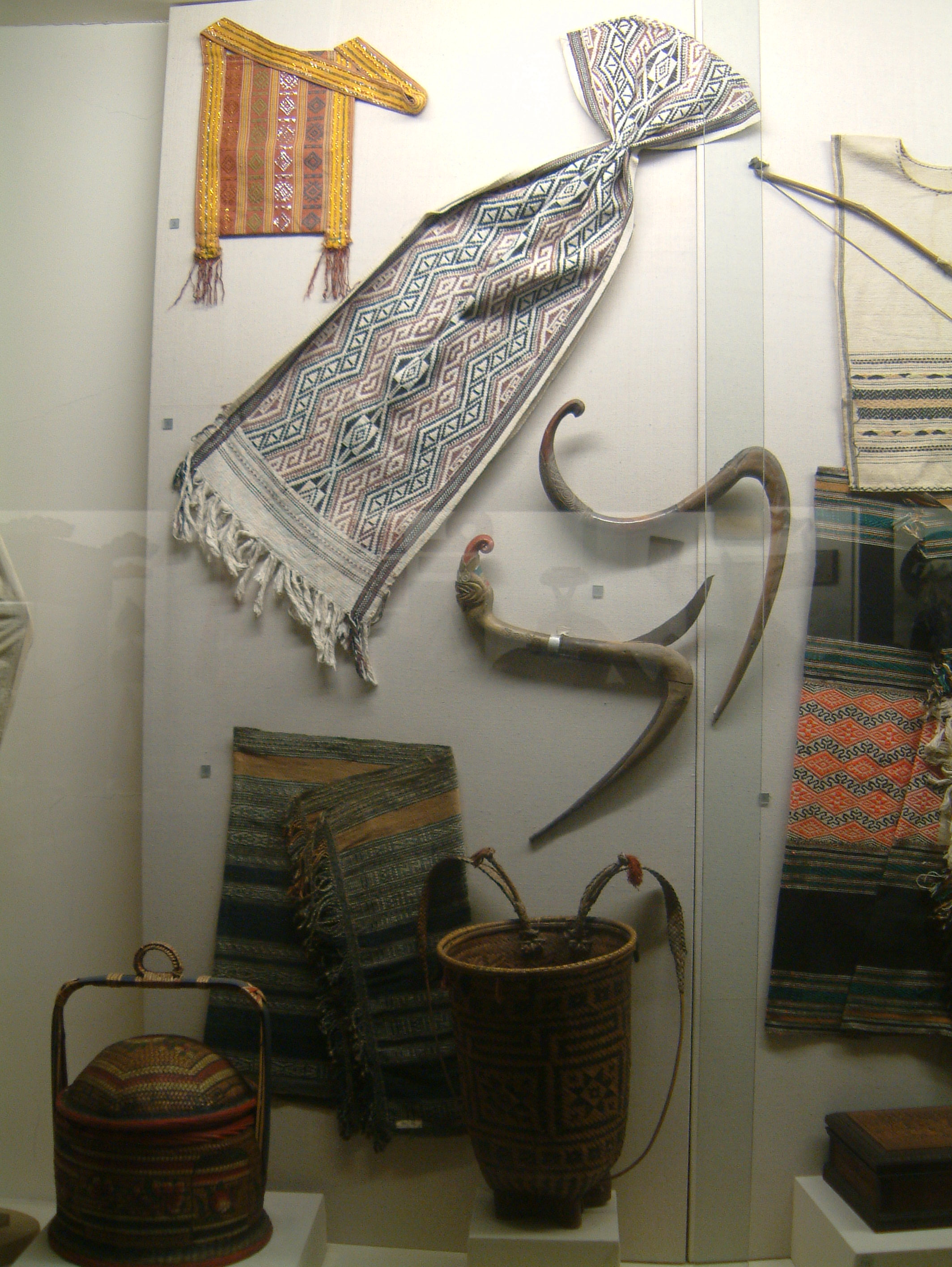
Some of the items traditionally used by the Bru people

The main occupation of the people Bru is manual swidden agriculture The main crop grown by the Bru and a main staple of their diet is rice. Other crops grown by the Bru are beans, and maize The Bru are also involved in animal husbandry, fishing and hunting. The Bru are also involved in various crafts works which include basket-making and in the making of straw mats.

The territories populated by the Bru include excellent conditions for prosperity, but the regions where they live lack adequate infrastructure for much needed development. Recent projects including cultivation of rubber, coffee, tobacco and cotton have struggled due to these conditions. In Thailand developments of the northeast region by the Thai Government has led to somewhat better economic development among the Bru people.

== Governance ==
Every Bru village is relatively independent of others villages. A leader Headman (who in more traditional areas is often the village spiritual advisor) leads the community.

In Thailand the village headman is democratically elected by members (usually the men) of the village

In Laos, the village headman was integrated into the state administration.

== Culture ==
The Bru are a patriarchal society where men held to a higher status than the women of the family and where older members enjoy a higher status than their younger counterparts.

Men often practice polygamy, which although not sanctioned by the culture is accepted. Usually a polygamous man will have several wives spread out over several villages in which he travels.

The Bru are socially outgoing and love music and dancing. They are very musical and are skilled with many different instruments including castanets, drums, gongs, zithers and simple and traditional instruments that used to accompany singing tales (cha chap) and change songs (sim)

Although they are a Katuic people, they've adopted some elements of Tai culture. Their clothing reflects this, combining Tai and Katuic elements.
