= Ta Oi people =

Ethnic group from Vietnam and Laos

Ta Oi
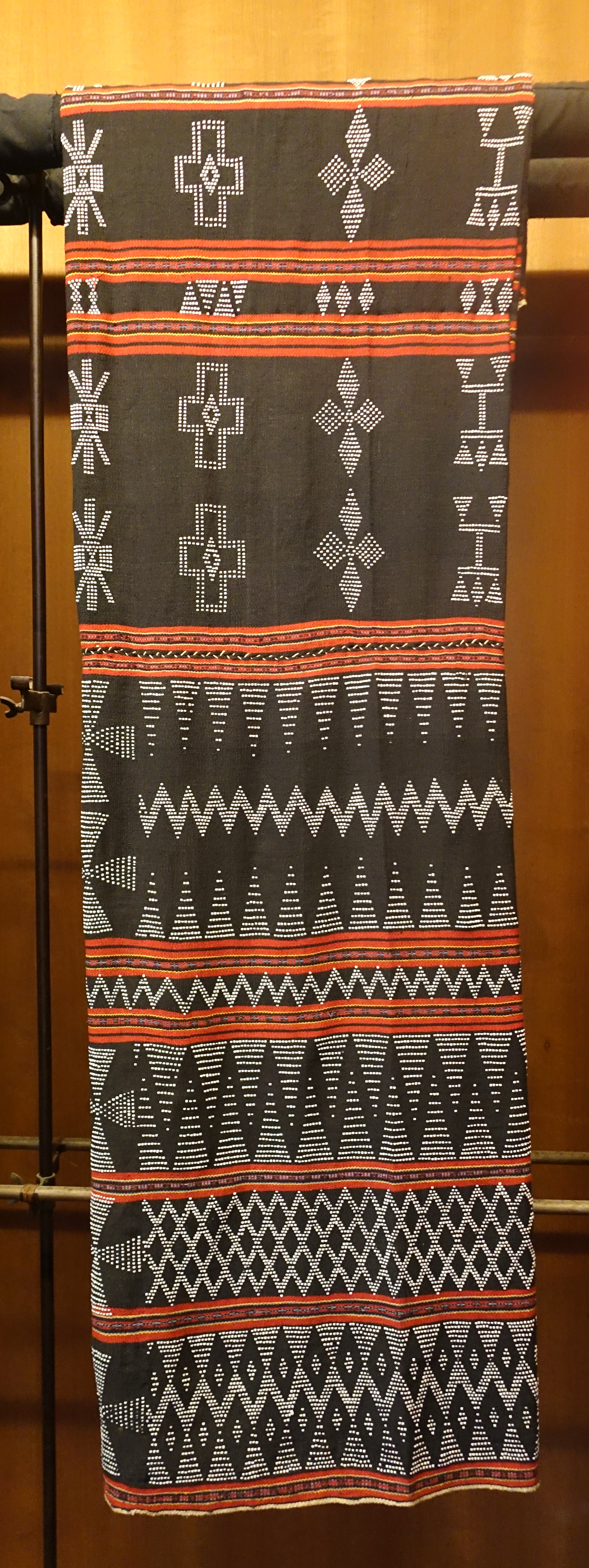
- Traditional Ta Oi skirt at the Vietnam Museum of Ethnology in Hanoi

Regions with significant populations
- Vietnam 52,356 (2019); Laos 45,991 (2015)

Languages
- Ta'oih • Vietnamese

Religion
- Animism • Buddhism

The Tà Ôi is an ethnic group of Vietnam (52,356 in 2019) and Laos (45,991 in 2015).

They speak the Ta’Oi language, a Mon–Khmer language. They are concentrated in A Lưới district of Huế city and Hướng Hóa District of Quảng Trị Province in Vietnam, and in muang Ta Oy of Saravane Province in southern Laos.

== Culture of the Ta Oi in A Lưới District, Thừa Thiên-Huế province ==
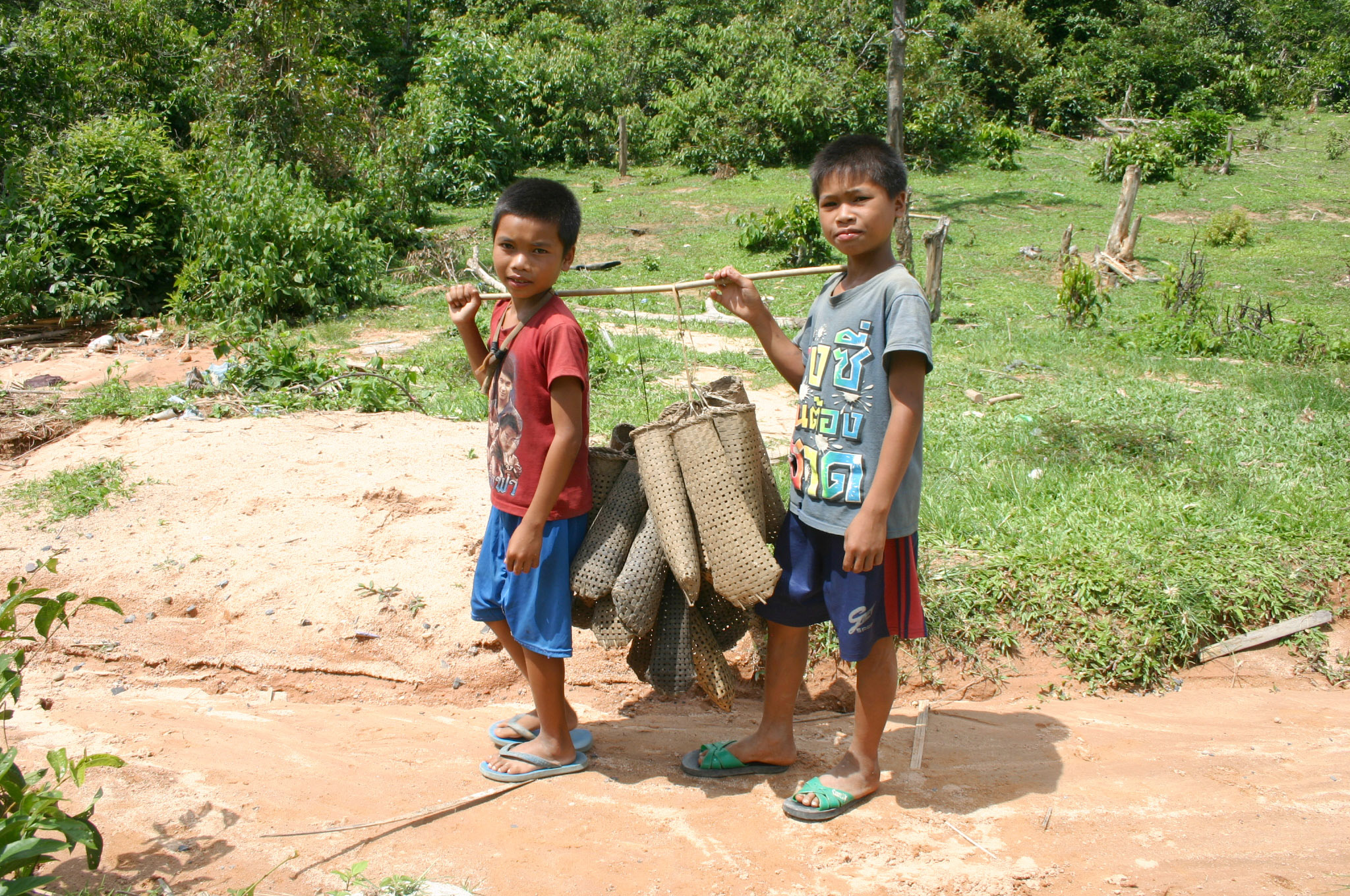
Ta Oi boys with fish traps, Salavan Province, Laos

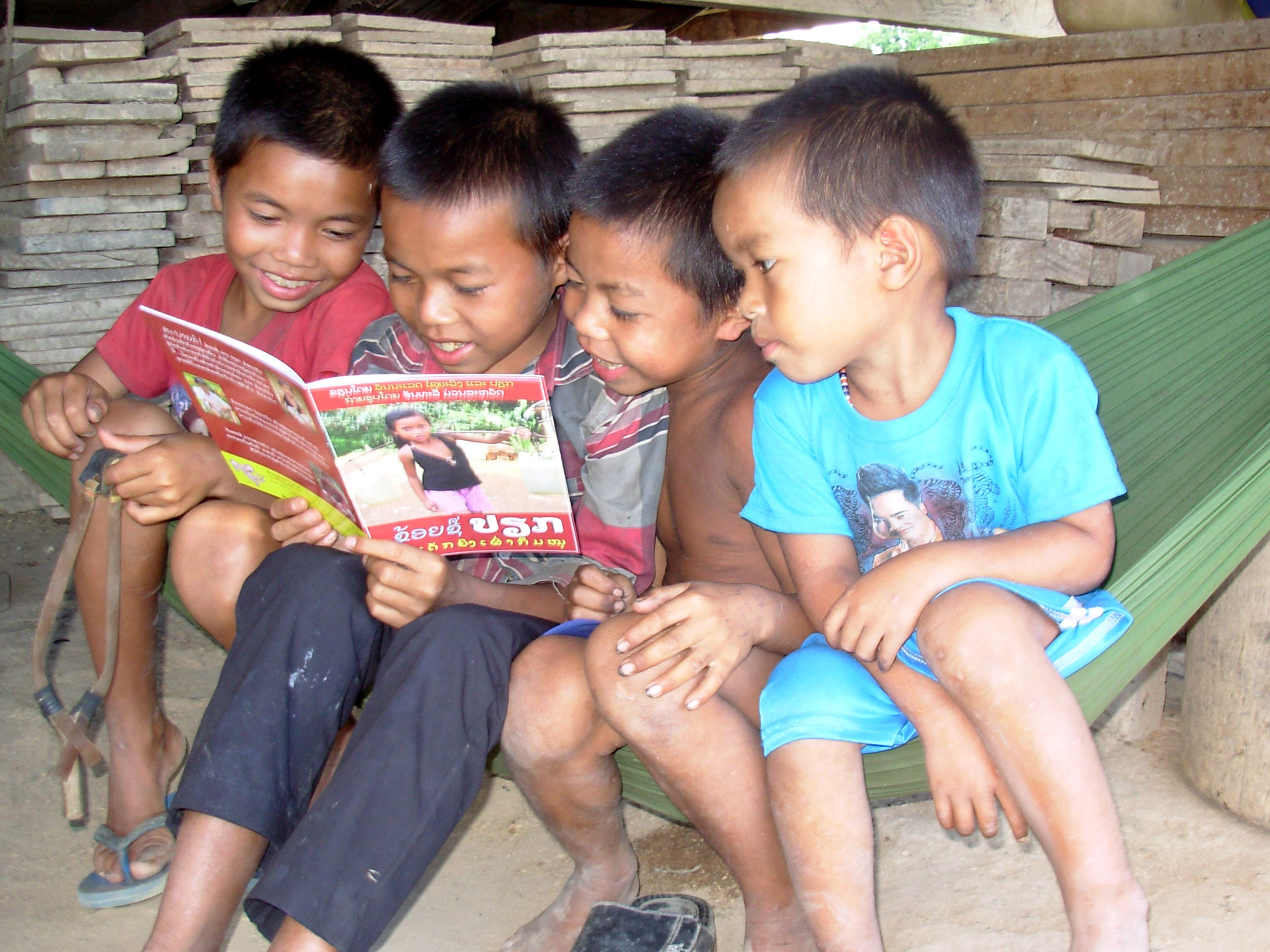
Ta Oi boys reading, Salavan Province, Laos

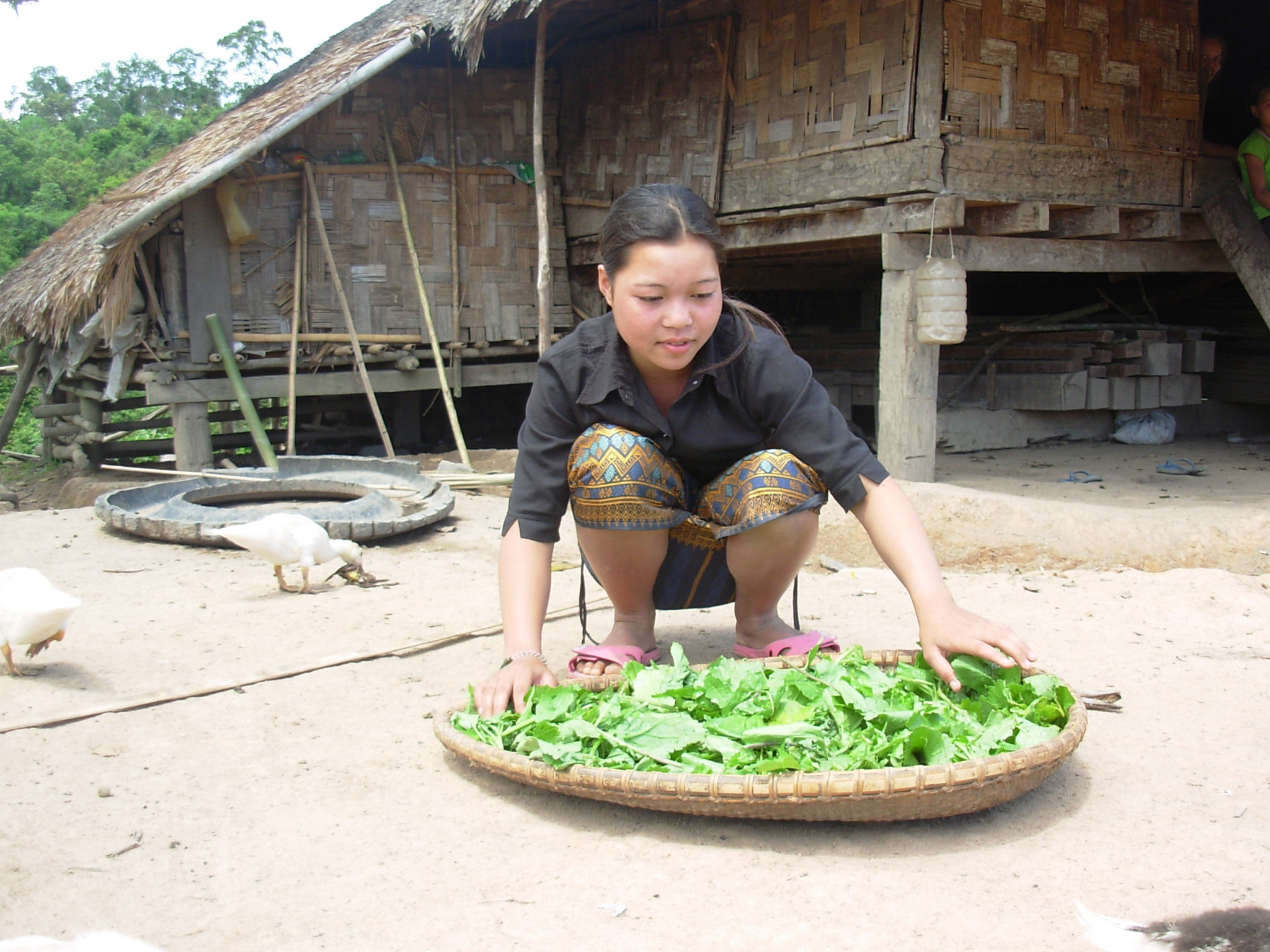
Ta Oi women spreading leaves also known as pak gat, Salavan Province, Laos

The Ta-oi ethnic group speaks a language in the Mon–Khmer language family, and is regarded as one of Vietnam's indigenous groups. The Ta Oi call themselves Taoih, or sometimes as Taoih or Ta Uot, and is called by the Paco sub-group as Can Tua or Can Tang, which means "highlanders".

According to the April 1, 1999 census on population and housing, the Ta-oi have a population of 34,960, accounting for 0.07% of the national population. At present, the Ta-oi live in both Vietnam and Laos, in the latter nation where they the Ta oi mainstream population and also call themselves as Ta-oih. Another sub-group of the Ta-Oi is called as Paco (Pa coh), which means "persons who live behind the mountains." Judging by the family clan origin, marriage and family relationship and language, the Ba hi people who mainly lives in Hướng Hóa District, Quảng Trị Province, can be regarded as a local sub-group of the Ta-oi.

The Ta-oi in Nham commune explain that they called themselves as Ta uot, but the members of the Kinh ethnic group coming from the lowlands of Thừa Thiên–Huế called them as Ta-oi. The Ta uot group lives mainly in middle-level of mountains and are sparsely distributed in the mountain tops. In addition to swidden cultivation, they are adept in growing cotton, weaving cloth and brocades, in sewing or fastening glass beads on costumes, and in making some musical instruments (drums, pan flutes).

The Paco live at the foot of mountains and hills, are conversant in slope field cultivation, in bamboo and rattan weaving, but are not adept in cloth weaving. But they are good traders who earn profits through exchanging cloth and clothes, blacksmith goods, beautiful shoulder baskets, honey against other more valuable goods. The Ba hi live in valleys close to the lowland areas and are adept in trading and in wet paddy cultivation. Thus, the Ta-oi do take into account various elements of topography, environment and economic activities in order to assess and analyze their own ethnic group and sub-groups, and their different characteristics.

== Religious beliefs ==
Only a small number of cultural anthropologists possess any understanding about this ethnic group's belief systems. Fundamental to the Ta Oi's spiritual life is animism, the belief that natural objects are animated by spirits. This belief can take diverse forms. Things in nature may all have within them different spirits—each rock, tree, and cloud may have its own unique spirit.

In contrast, all things in nature may be thought of as having the same spirit. Initially, animatism and animism may seem to be the same thing. In fact both beliefs are often found in the same culture. The difference, however, is that the "power" of animatism does not have a personality—it is an impersonal "it" rather than a "he" or "she" with human-like characteristics. Spirits are individual supernatural beings with their own recognizable traits.

=== Souls and spirits ===
The Ta-oi follow animism and believe that all things have souls. Mention must first be made about souls. The soul lies from the breast to the head when a human being is still alive. When the human being dies, there is only one soul (avai ving) which wanders in the cemetery. If the deceased is not happy with his/her family, his/her soul used to disturb and disrupt the lives of human beings in the family concerned. The souls of the dead used to come back during rituals, as also through various dreams (am bo) of the living.

The Ta-oi believe that the soul can integrate itself into the voice, can create a force that can exert an impact on other things. For example, the soul can come back and knock at your door. The Ta-oi also believe that if no asset is distributed to the deceased, after three days its soul may come back and demand assets. As a precaution against this, the Ta-oi used to spread firewood ashes in front of their doors in order to identify the footprints of the soul.

In 2003, Mr Vo Dau died, and his wife, Mrs Ka Dau, spread ash at her door. As she could see his foot prints on the ash, she concluded that he had come back. Some other persons say that they could hear certain noises that show that the soul has come back, has poured water into a cup or has taken some foodstuffs out of the pot. It is not until the third day following death, that the deceased become conscious of his/her death. Before that, there was no awareness because he/she was in a state of sleep and dream, or half asleep and half-awake.

Bad souls are the souls of women who died in child delivery, of men who were devoured by tigers etc.. They would appear in the graves, would cry or return to the village and tease the living. They may come back and demand clothing, shoulder baskets, knives etc.. In such cases, poor families would cut banana leaves into various forms – the T symbolizing clothing, the V symbolizing pants – and thrust them across the door. Rich families would hurl out 2 pieces of cloth. And all these families say almost the same thing to the souls:”we have given you presents, please refrain from asking more, please refrain from disturbing us, please bless us”.

Spirits are different from the soul of deceased humans, and there are many types of spirits. The brau brieu spirit is a kind of forest spirit that can bless human beings but can also cause illnesses. It can also direct tigers, snakes and other wild beasts and cause them to harm human beings.

In the past, the Ta-oi held annual rituals dedicated to the spirits: the heavens spirit (abang), the earth spirit (katek), the forest spirit (krum kaek).

The ritual dedicated to the heavens spirit (giang abang) was held once every 10–12 years. In case prosperity, bumper harvest are enjoyed by the village along with absence of illnesses and death, the village must hold a thanksgiving ritual dedicated to Giang kmuk (ma người chết nói chung). In case the village is hit by floods and other natural calamities, it must hold ritual dedicated to the heavens spirit, the earth spirit, the Rong house spirit, and the house spirit.

Rituals dedicated to the heavens spirit must involve 12 types of foodstuffs, to the earth spirit 8 types of foodstuffs, to Giang kmuk 5 types of foodstuffs. These foodstuffs are: buffalo meat, pork, chicken, blood pudding, grilled meat, mon thai, soup, glutinous rice. Rice must be put in bowls, “doak” liquor must be served in jars, cups. Incense sticks must be burned.

=== Water spirit (giang dak) ===
The Ta-oi inhabitants imagine the water spirit as a short old man with white hair and white beard. They also respectfully refer to him as “Uncle” (Avo). It is believed that the water spirit can give people a lot of fish as food, and a Ta-oi legend has it that the water spirit creates fish by putting grains of rice in a banana leaf and dropping them into the brook, thus turning them into fish. It is reported that when they were still in Laos Mr Quynh Say, Mr Quynh Chay have seen the water spirit at the water sources.

The Ta-oi believe that the water spirit has a special relationship with the water supply pipe of the village: when water is first brought to the village through lo-o bamboo pipes, no one is allowed to use it; the village head and the heads of family clans perform a ritual dedicated to the water spirit with a cock as offering, beseeching it to make sure that the water flow would never dry up and that water would not cause belly ache to those who drink it. Thereafter, the cock is slaughtered near the Rong house and its blood is buried in the place of arrival of water.

In that very place, the pillar where is attached the village water pipe is beautifully decorated and is strengthened and repaired each year, and some chicken blood is buried there (sol rtang dak). Before using the water for the first time, a ritual must be performed by the village head with a pig and a goat and a chicken as offerings to the water spirit (aul – avo dak).The inhabitants of other villages are not allowed to use that water.

=== The house spirit (giang an teng) ===
In the past, the Ta-oi lived in long houses where each family had its own room, where it worships its house spirit. In his dream, the family head may see the house spirit integrating itself into a loin cloth, a “reng” piece of cloth or any other thing. Thereafter, he would put that loin cloth or reng cloth..into a kang (a shoulder basket made for this specific purpose) which is put at a corner of the house, and would slaughter a chicken and perform a ritual on the arrival of the house spirit (giang an teng) into his house.

From then on, when the family holds a ritual in connection with a funeral, a wedding, a ritual dedicated to the forest spirit or the water spirit, the ritual must also be dedicated to the giang an teng (house spirit). Any achievement of the family used to be attributed to the help given by the house spirit. The family does not open the “kang” where lies the house spirit, except in the A ja annual celebrations when each family must open the “kang” and use the sacred item therein for rituals inside the family and in the Rong house. When a ritual is held, the family head used to put some cooked rice, some rice grains, and meat in front of the “kang” and offers prayers.

=== The spirit of the Long house (giang danh) ===
The long house where lived many families has its own spirit (giang danh) which stayed in the room reserved to visitors/guests, where a small house hung under the roof is the shelter of giang danh. In case of illness or any bad happening in the family, the family used to hold a ritual dedicated to giang an teng (house spirit) and thereafter another ritual dedicated to giang danh.

While participating in village rituals or celebrations, the head of the long house must also perform a ritual dedicated to the giang danh. As and when a family household in the long house eats goat, buffalo or cow meat, it must keep giang danh informed by performing a ritual.

=== Tiger spirit (giang avo) ===
Of all forest wild beasts, the Ta-oi regard tigers as the most powerful animal and as a protecting spirit of the village. They regard the capture of a tiger as a gift of the forest spirit. The capture of a tiger is preceded by a number of incidental dreams: because of such a dream, a villager sets up a big trap (ti ho), the trap owner sees in his dream a tiger (a vo bok) who expresses the desire to stay in the village. When a tiger falls into the trap, the hunter and inhabitants must hold a ritual dedicated to the forest spirit, involving such offerings as sol, leo, agate beads and a “reng” cloth.

Only after such an elaborate ritual, would they cut the head of the tiger and take it to the village. A group of young men build a grave house for the tiger (ping a vo), but it is not until a ritual is held by the village that the head of the tiger could be put in the grave house. The ritual held by the village for the inauguration of the tiger's grave house involves a goat, a pig and a chicken as offerings, which are put on a tray and then in the grave house.

The village head's prayer would be as follows: As giang vo wishes to stay in the village, it must protect the villagers from death; when there is war between this village and other villages, giang vo must keep the village informed through dreams, as early as possible; if any one attempts to destroy or burn the village, giang vo must punish him/her. Local women and visitors from outside are not allowed to attend the ritual dedicated to the head of the tiger. If a visitor from another village wishes to attend the ritual, the village head must be informed and would take a decision.

The tiger's grave house is usually located on a higher ground in the vicinity of the human graves house, and no one is allowed to enter it. It is surrounded by a stone hedge. In the middle of the house is a stone on which is placed the tiger's head. The house also contains a number of presents given by the villagers to the tiger: a bowl (for containing food), armlet, a “reng” piece of cloth, buffalo and cow horns, pig's jaw which have been prepared and contributed on the instruction of the village head.

When the Rong house is inaugurated, when new year celebrations and new paddy celebrations are held each year, some food, including new rice, must be presented to the tiger spirit. The tiger's grave is visited and cleaned once every year by the villagers. Tigers are worshipped because people believe that the worshipped tiger would keep them informed through dreams about such bad happenings as war, crop failure or epidemics.

In Laos, some villages worshipped two tigers’ heads. At present, only Nham I hamlet continues to worship tigers as a custom. Ka Linh, Ta Keu hamlets worshipped tigers when they were still located in Laos. One can say that from the end of the anti-US war, such a worship no longer prevails in the Ta-oi ethnic community.

=== Love magic ===
This ethnological term refers to the practice of some minority ethnic groups who are adept in using some products for inducing a girl and turning her into one's wife. The Ta-oi call that product as “love medicine” (nang). According to the Ta-oi, this is a resin collected from the feet of the “Ko-tach” bird, a bird of black and red plumage, similar to a parrot. If you put that resin in the shoulder basket of a girl or in her hair, that girl would follow you. But the “Ko tach” bird only lives in Laos and so the resin is only available in Laos, not in Vietnam.

== See also ==
- List of ethnic groups in Vietnam

== Notes ==
- Nguyễn Thị Sửu; Trần Hoàng. 2010. Văn hóa dân gian dân tộc Ta-Ôih (Huyện A Lưới, Thừa Thiên Huế). Hanoi: Nhà xuất bản dân trí. ISBN 978-604-917-068-3
- Trần Nguyễn Khánh Phong. 2013. Ca dao, câu đố dồng dao, tục ngữ và trò chơi dân gian dân tộc Tà Ôi. Hanoi: Nhà xuất bản văn hóa thông tin. ISBN 978-604-50-0370-1
