= Ta'Oi language =

Southeast Asian dialect chain

Ta'Oi
- Ta Oi
- Native to: Laos, Vietnam
- Ethnicity: Ta Oi, Katang
- Native speakers: (220,000 cited 1995–2005)
- Language family: Austroasiatic: Katuic; Ta'Oi

Language codes
- ISO 639-3: Variously: tth – Upper Ta'Oi irr – Ir (Hantong) oog – Ong (= Ir) tto – Lower Ta'Oi ngt – Ngeq (Kriang)
- Glottolog: taoi1247
- ELP: Chatong

Ta'Oi (Ta'Oih, Ta Oi) is a dialect continuum within the Katuic branch of the Austroasiatic language family, spoken amongst the Ta Oi people in the Salavan and Sekong provinces in Laos and the municipality of Huế in Vietnam.

== Varieties ==
Sidwell (2005) lists the following varieties of Ta'Oi, which is a name applied to speakers of various related dialects.

- Ta'Oi proper
- Ong/Ir/Talan
- Chatong is spoken about 50 to 100 km northeast of Sekong. It has been recorded only by Theraphan L-Thongkum.
- Kriang (Ngkriang, Ngeq) is spoken by up to 4,000 people living in villages between Tatheng and Sekong, such as Ban Chakamngai.
- Kataang (Katang) is a dialect that has been documented by Michel Ferlus, Gerard Diffloth, and other linguists. It is not to be confused with the Bru dialect of Katang.

== Phonology ==
=== Consonants ===
		Labial	Alveolar	Palatal	Velar	Glottal
Nasal		m	n	ɲ	ŋ	
Plosive	voiceless	p	t	c	k	ʔ
Plosive	voiced	b	d	ɟ	ɡ	ʔ
Fricative			s			h
Rhotic			r			
Approximant		w	l	j		

- There are also creaky syllable-final segments /mʔ, nʔ, ŋʔ, wʔ, lʔ, jʔ/, however; they are not noted as a distinct series.
- /ɟ/ may also be heard as a preglottal sound [ʔj].

=== Vowels ===
Monophthongs
	Front	Central	Back
Close	i iː	ɨ ɨː	u uː
Mid	e eː	ə əː	o oː
Open	ɛ ɛː	a aː	ɔ ɔː

Diphthongs
	Front	Central	Back
Close	ia	ɨa	ua

== Morphosyntax ==
Taoih, like other Katuic languages, is largely analytic with a pronominal paradigm which are marked for dative and genitive case.

Taoih Pronouns
	1st person			2nd person			3rd person		
	singular	dual	plural	singular	dual	plural	singular	dual	plural
Unmarked	aku	ɲaːŋ	muhɛ̰	amɛ̰	iɲoa	ipe	ʔo	aɲoʔa	ape
Genitive	ʔәŋku	ʔәŋɲaːŋ	ʔәŋhɛ̰	ʔŋmɛ̰/ənmaɨ	ʔŋoiɲoa	ʔŋoipe	ʔŋo	ʔŋoaɲoʔa	ʔŋoape
Dative	ʔaku	ʔaɲaːŋ	ʔahɛ̰	ʔammɛ̰/ʔammai	ʔaoiɲoa	ʔaoipe	ʔao	ʔaoaɲoʔa	ʔaoape
Locative	-	-	ʔihɛ̰	ʔimɛ̰/ʔimai	-	-	ʔido	-	ʔimaɨ

Urəʔ ʔәŋ-maɨ
book GEN-2SG
Your book

Taoih is prominently a neutral alignment language. Taoih exhibits neutral alignment for case with (in)transitive verbs and also neutral alignment for agreement in both (in)transitive and ditransitive frames, the verb never shows agreement with any argument, regardless of its transitivity.

Kujuʔk doŋ uruʔ ʔa-o-iɲoʔa aɲoʔa ʔa-o-ndil
Kuyu’k give book DAT-LK-2SG and DAT-LK-girl
"Kuyuk gives the book to you (dual) and the girl."

To mark benefactive arguments, the dative marker and preposition adeh occur before the recipient.

ku takoːh adeh ʔa-o-akoːɲ aɲoʔa ʔa-maɨ
1SG cook for.BEN DAT-LK-father and DAT-2SG
"I cook for father and you."
