= Holy Man's Rebellion =

1901–1936 rebellion in Thailand and French Laos

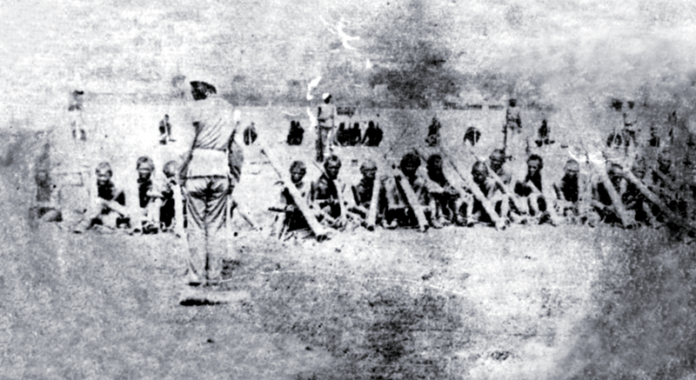
- Captured Phu Mi Bun rebels in 1901
Date	March 1901 – January 1936
Location	French Laos and Northeast Siam.
Result	Franco-Siamese victory.

Belligerents
Phu Mi Bun Movement	French Indochina (Thailand) Siam (until 1902)

Commanders and leaders
Ong Keo †; Ong Man; Ong Kommandam †	(French Indochina) Paul Doumer (Thailand) Chulalongkorn

Strength
4,000	500+ 2 cannons

Casualties and losses
450+ killed 150+ wounded 400+ captured	54+ killed

The Holy Man's Rebellion (Thai: กบฏผู้มีบุญ), took place in French Laos and Northeast Siam between March 1901 and January 1936. It started when supporters of the Phu Mi Bun religious movement initiated an armed rebellion against French Indochina and Siam, aiming at installing the sorcerer Ong Keo as king. By 1902 the uprising was put down in Siam, continuing in French Indochina until being fully suppressed in January 1936.

== Background ==
=== Geopolitical situation ===
Before the Monthon reforms initiated by king Chulalongkorn, Siamese territories were divided into three categories: Inner Provinces forming the core of the kingdom, Outer Provinces that were adjacent to the inner provinces and tributary states located on the border regions. The area of southern Laos that came under Siamese control following the Lao rebellion (1826–1828) and destruction of Vientiane belonged to the later category, maintaining relative autonomy. Lao nobles who had received the approval of the Siamese king exercised authority on the Lao population as well as the Alak and Laven-speaking tribesmen. Larger tribal groups often raided weaker tribes abducting people and selling them into slavery at the trading hub of Champasak, while themselves falling prey to Khmer, Lao and Siamese slavers. From Champasak the slaves were transported to Phnom-Penh and Bangkok, thus creating a large profits for the slavers and various middlemen. In 1874 and 1884, king Chulalongkorn enacted two decrees banning the capture and sale of Kha slaves while also freeing all slaves born after 1868. Those abolitionist policies had an immediate effect on slave trading communities.

In 1883, France attempted to expand its control in Southeast Asia by claiming that the Treaty of Huế extended into all Vietnamese vassal states. French troops gradually occupied the Kontum Plateau and pushed the Siamese from Laos following the Franco-Siamese crisis. A new buffer zone was thus created on the west bank of Mekong. As the area lacked the presence of the Siamese military, local outlaws flocked the newly created safe haven. In 1899, Siam abolished the tributes collected from vassal states, replacing them with a new tax collected from all able bodied men, undermining the authority of Lao officials. The combined effects of the abolitionist laws and taxation led the Lao and Kha nobility into an open rebellion.

=== French colonization in the Bolaven Plateau ===
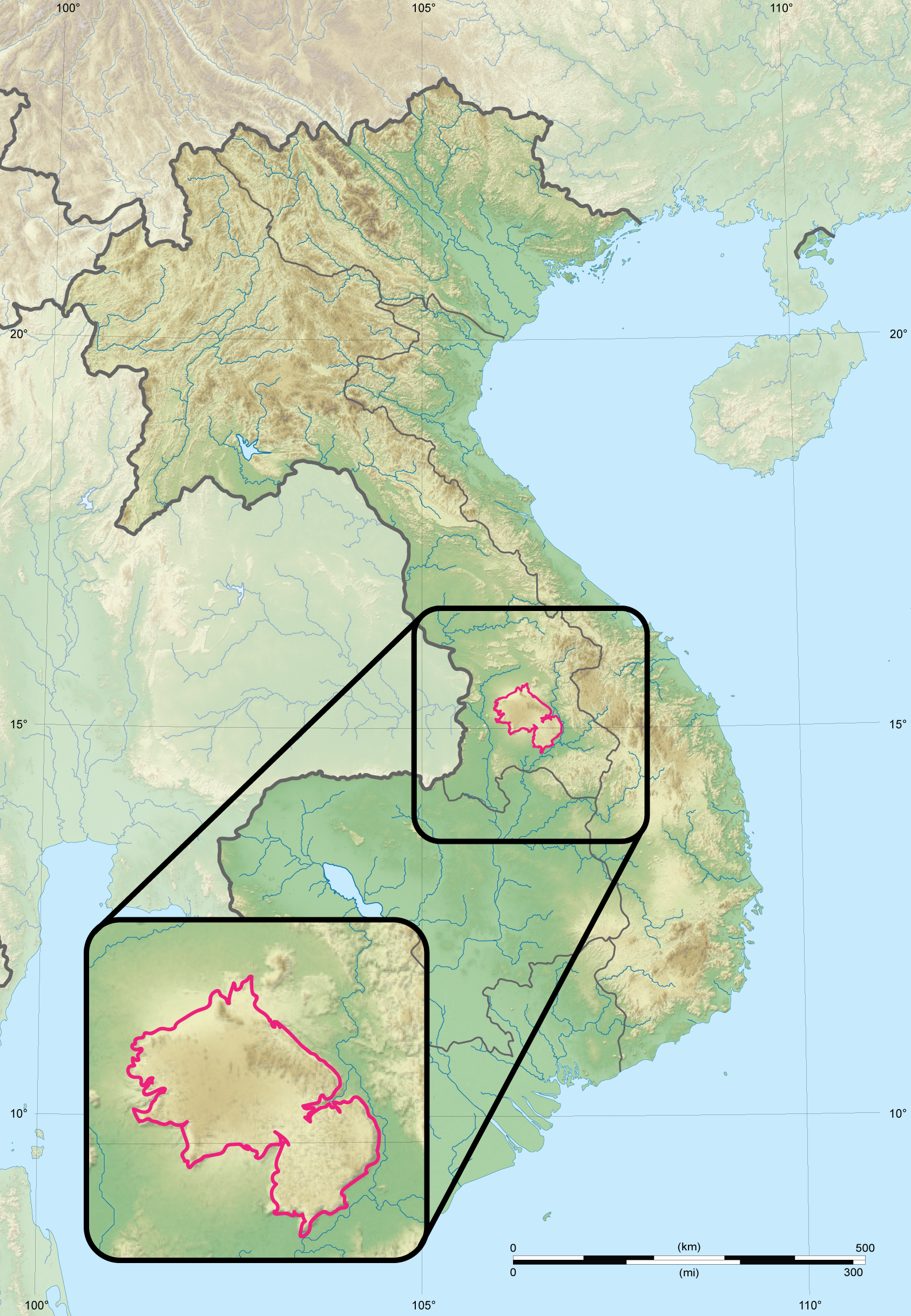
Location of the Bolaven Plateau in French Indochina.

The Bolaven Plateau, then located in the south of the Laos protectorate, was characterized by "red earths" from basalt escaping from volcanic faults. These regions were synonymous with fertility and wealth and there were even rumors of gold deposits.

It was populated by Lao Theung tribes, who spoke Austroasiatic languages. Since the fall of the Lan Xang kingdom, they had maintained a strong hostility towards the Thai inhabitants of the plains and had suffered their contempt. Associated with "savages", they have the reputation of living half-naked and believing in superstitions, sorcerers and thevada (healers).

The arrival of the French in Laos was badly received by the mountain populations. Indeed, the colonial authorities placed chiefs in the region to collect taxes and impose forced labor. The forced labor allowed the progress of what the French called "major works." The Bolovens Plateau, for example, was connected to Cochinchina by making the Mekong navigable. Trade was thus to be facilitated. The main goal of these forced labor was to create a road network that would pass through the entire territory of French Indochina.

The traditional exploitation of Lao Theung was reproduced by the colonial authorities. The mandarins (high-ranking officials) organized the corvées and did not respect the rhythm of life of the Lao Theung based on rice cultivation. The rice fields were abandoned during the harvest months due to lack of means. The practice of corvées was therefore dramatic for the Lao Theung community who had to suffer famine.

In addition to forced labor, the French irritated the mountain populations by placing district and provincial governors without taking into account ethnic groups and the disputes that might have pre-existed between the peoples of the plains (from whom most of the indigenous administrators were drawn) and those of the mountains, traditionally opposed. The mountain peoples found themselves once again under the authority of the populations from the plains, which caused incomprehension and revived old quarrels.

The French contempt for these populations made any attempts at reconciliation between the two sides difficult. The exploitation of the Lao Theung in the context of corvées and the burden of taxes also made the French colonizers very unpopular. The people living in these regions, known under the common name of Alak, reacted to the behavior of the French by uniting against the French colonizers. Their knowledge of the environment was an advantage against the colonizers who did not know the terrain.

== Conflict ==
=== Initial phase (1901–1910) ===
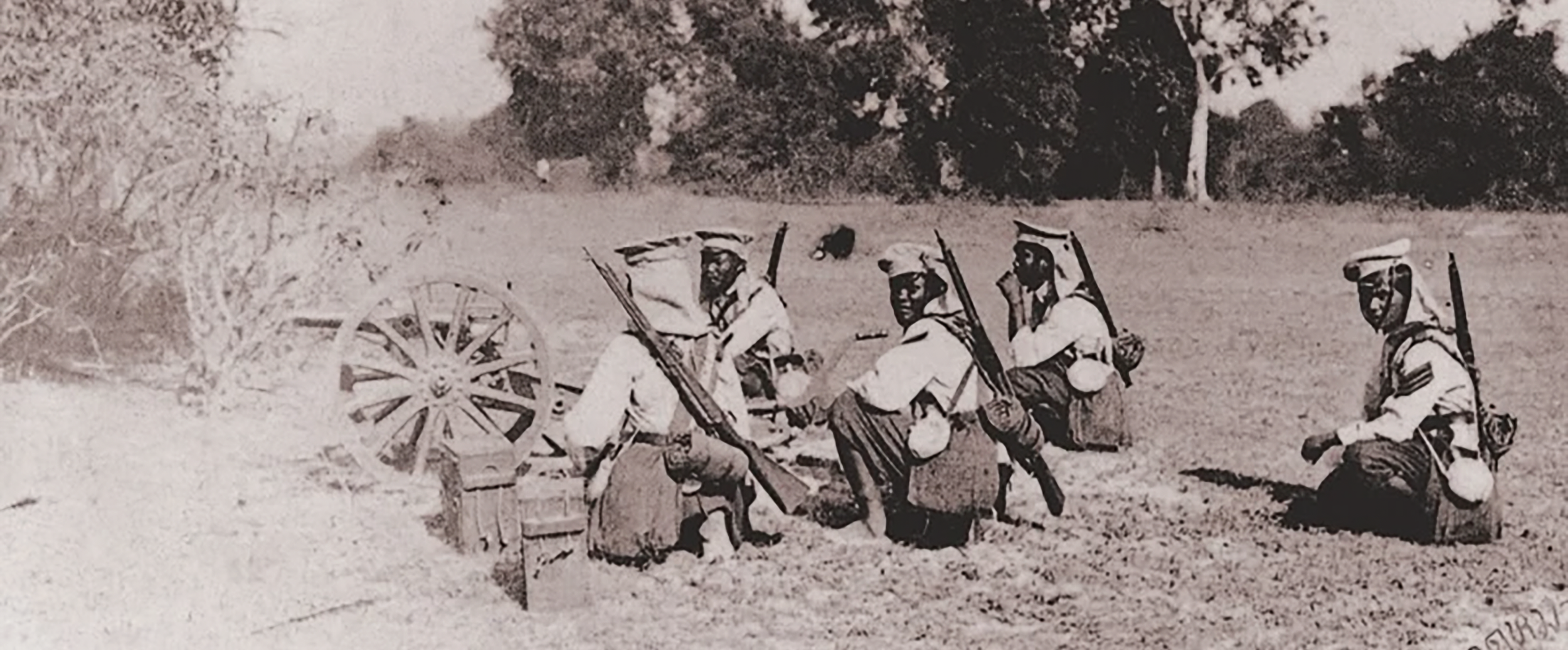
Thai Soldiers with a field gun at the Holy Man's Rebellion, 1901

In late March 1901, the French Commissioner of Saravane formed a small band of militiamen in order to investigate the popular gatherings organised by sorcerer Ong Keo on the Phou Kat mountain. Ong Keo had managed to gain a large following among the Alak, Sedang, Loven and Nha-heun tribals who venerated him as a proto-Bodhisattva, creating the millenarian Phu Mi Bun (Ruler of Justice) movement. On 12 April, the French patrol was ambushed by 1,500 Kha tribals, the commissioner managed to flee back to Saravane. Nevertheless, news of the uprising began spreading in the surrounding areas. On 29 May, Sedang rebels attacked a French outpost outside Kon Tum killing the commanding officer.

A prophecy then began circulating in Northeast Siam, various prophets claimed that a great catastrophe was going to take place in May 1901, while Phu Mi Bun would emerge as the ruler of the world. Ong Keo was expected to turn stones into gold and gold into stones, prompting his followers to collect stones and ceremonially kill animals in preparation for the event. In June 1901, a number of Lao chiefs proclaimed their allegiance to Ong Keo, and set fire to buildings along the Sedone river. In March 1902, the uprising spread into Siam after Ong Keo's officer Ong Man proclaimed himself to be the Phu Mi Bun and gathered a group of armed followers. On 28 March, Ong Man's troops raided Khemmarat in Siam, executing two officials, abducting the governor while also burning and looting the town. Siamese commissioner Sanphasitthiprasong responded by dispatching 400 soldiers to Surin, Srisaket, Yasothon, and Ubon. In the meantime, Ong Man had gathered 1,000 followers setting camp at Ban Sapheu. In the aftermath of a rebel ambush 9 Siamese soldiers were killed, the victory attracted 1,500 new followers to Ong Man's camp. A force of 100 soldiers and two cannons was then created, tasked with tracking Ong Man. On 3 April 1902, Siamese troops ambushed a rebel column outside Ubon, killing 300 and capturing 400 militants, the guerrillas that managed to survive the encounter fled to Laos.

In late April, a large group of chanting militants surrounded the French commissariat at Savannakhet. Believing that the French ammunition would turn into frangipani flowers, 150 rebels were slain and an equal number were wounded. The insurgents then relocated to the Phou Luong mountains, ceasing their activities until 1905. On 30 November 1905, insurgents massacred 41 Loven tribesmen in Ban Nong Bok Kao. Renewed French operations forced Ong Keo to surrender; however, he soon fled to Siam only to return to Laos and resume his struggle in the Bolovens Plateau. In 1910, Ong Keo was assassinated by French representative Fendler during peace negotiations, Fendler had hidden a pistol under his hat which remained undetected as the head was not searched according to Lao customs. Dauplay tried the same ploy to eliminate Ong Kommandam, but he managed to escape despite being hit by two pistol bullets. Ong Keo's officer Ong Kommandam then assumed command of the rebels.

=== Rebel leader in exile (1910–1925) ===
After Ong Keo's death, his main lieutenant Ong Kommandam was appointed as his successor. The situation was difficult and due to a lack of resources and weapons, he had to flee.

He found refuge in Phou Louan, between Thung Vai and the left bank of the Sekong, and hid there for fifteen years. Unable to resume open struggle, he fell into anonymity. This period is relatively poorly documented, but we do know that Ong Kommandam did not remain inactive. In particular, he extended his relations with the Lao Theung tribes. He called on them not to submit and to no longer pay taxes, despite the defeat.

It was only through leaflets distributed in the region in 1925 that the French administration became aware of the danger posed by Ong Kommandam. The rebel leader's slogan was: "in two years there will be no more French people"; words which showed that the threat remained and that it was more belligerent than ever.

=== Final phase (1925–1936) ===
Under Ong Kommandam's command, the movement took on a proto-nationalist dimension. He put forward the idea that, after having been driven into the mountains by the French, the inhabitants of the plains intended to exterminate the Lao Theung with the help of the colonizers. A report by the security commissioner Bollen indicated that Kommandam was nicknamed the "genius who sees everything that happens at very long distances" (chau pha olahat ta) and that he was "charged by Heaven to create the Kha kingdom". Ong Kommandam therefore also sought to reactivate Ong Keo's messianic impulse.

Ong Kommandam created a common history for the inhabitants of the southern highlands of Laos; a history that could unite the tribes within a common identity, the Alak. The new leader of the movement imagined, for the people he had united under his banner, a prestigious past coming from the ancient Khmer Empire and the ancient Lan Xang kingdom.

This rebel leader strengthened alliances between the mountain tribes despite old quarrels. He transformed the refusal to join the army, to do forced labor and to pay taxes into a patriotic act. He also created schools and a common language for the mountain people in order to be able to coordinate on the military level. Finally, he invented the Khom script: a coded language to facilitate the organization of the rebels during ambushes.

To oppose the actions of Ong Kommandam, Governor General René Robin, in charge of repression operations, gave full powers to Commander Nyo to definitively stop the insurrection. To do this, he had several regiments of Sedang, Khmer and Djaraï riflemen at his disposal. June 1936, having failed to kill Ong Kommandam, Nyo decides to continue the search despite the rainy season. On September 23, a rebel partisan betrays the location of Ong Kommandam. Surrounded by the French, he is killed and his sons are interned, including his son Sithon, the future independence leader. The death of the leader Ong Kommandam definitively puts an end to the armed struggle.

== See also ==
- Lao rebellion (1826–1828)
- Haw wars (1865–1890)
- Paknam Incident (1893)
- War of the Insane (1918–1921)

== Sources ==
- Moppert, François (1978). Mouvement de résistance au pouvoir colonial français de la minorité protoindochinoise du plateau des Bolovens dans le Sud Laos : 1901-1936 (PhD thesis in History) (in French). Paris: Paris 7.
- Moppert, François (1981). "The Boloven Revolt (1901–1936)". In Pierre Brocheux (ed.). Histoire de l'Asie du Sud-Est: Révoltes, Réformes, Révolutions (in French). Lille: Presses universitaires de Lille.

=== Further reading ===
- Baird, I. G. (June 1, 2013). Millenarian movements in southern Laos and North Eastern Siam (Thailand) at the turn of the twentieth century: Reconsidering the involvement of the Champassak house royal. South East Asia Research, 21, 2, 257-279.
