= Black Lion =

Black Lion, Black Lions, or Blacklions may refer to:

== Businesses and organisations ==
- Black Lion, Bridlington, a pub in the East Riding of Yorkshire
- Black Lion, Hammersmith, a London pub
- Black Lion, Kilburn, a London pub
- Black Lion Records, a British jazz record company
- Black Lions Films, associated with ITC Entertainment
- Black Lion Leisure Centre, a former leisure centre in Gillingham, Kent, England, now known as Medway Park Sports Centre

== Military and politics ==
- Black Lions, an Ethiopian anti-fascist resistance movement
- Black Lions, nickname of 28th Infantry Regiment (United States)
- Operation Black Lion, 1972, in the Laotian Civil War
  - Operation Black Lion III, 1972–1973
  - Operation Black Lion V, 1972–1973
- Blacklions, nickname of VFA-213, an aviation unit of the U.S. Navy

== Other uses ==
- Black Lion Lane, a street in London, England
- The Black Lion, a Georgian rugby union team
- Black Lion, a 2020 album by Stevie Stone
- Black Lion (สิงห์ดำ), a swordsman hero character in 1960s Thai comics created by Niwat Taraphan
- Blacklion, a village in County Cavan, Ireland

== See also ==
- Black lion tamarin, a monkey
- Black Lion Crossing Halt railway station, Aberdare, Wales
