= Ban Hinlat =

- Village
- Location in Laos
- Coordinates: 14°8′N 105°38′E
- Country: Laos
- Province: Champasak Province
- District: Mounlapamok District
- Time zone: UTC+7 (ICT)

Ban Hinlat is a fishing village in Mounlapamok District, Champasak Province, in southern Laos. It is near the border with Cambodia.
