= Operation Black Lion V =

- Part of Laotian Civil War; Vietnam War
Date	21 November 1972–22 February 1973
Location	Southern Laos
Result	Ceasefire officially ends the Laotian Civil War
Territorial changes	Royal Lao forces temporarily capture Paksong

Belligerents
Kingdom of Laos; Supported by United States; Thailand	North Vietnam (Laos) Pathet Lao

Units involved
(Kingdom of Laos) Mobile Group 33; Mobile Group 401; MR 4 Special Battalion	9th Regiment; Dac Cong sappers

Operation Black Lion V (21 November 1972–22 February 1973) was the final Royal Lao Government offensive of the Laotian Civil War. Launched as a followup to Operation Black Lion and Operation Black Lion III, it too was aimed at regaining control of the Bolovens Plateau, which overlooked the Ho Chi Minh trail. This last assault took the town of Paksong on the plateau on 6 December 1972 and held it until a ceasefire took effect at midday on 22 February 1973. A People's Army of Vietnam attack began at 12:05 the same day and overran Paksong by dark.

== Overview ==
The crucial Ho Chi Minh Trail was central to the People's Army of Vietnam (PAVN) strategy for beating the Republic of Vietnam during the Second Indochina War. The Democratic Republic of Vietnam's victory depended on the Trail's supply line, located in the Kingdom of Laos. Ongoing air and ground campaigns sponsored by the United States seeking to sever the Trail had no lasting effect on Communist logistics efforts.

The Central Intelligence Agency (CIA) instigated a number of guerrilla operations against the Trail. The enormous South Vietnamese attack of 18 February 1971 proved insufficient to sever the Trail. Despite these failures, the CIA continued its attempted offensives to disrupt the Trail's activities. Among the latter operations were three similarly named offensives: Operation Black Lion, Operation Black Lion III, and Operation Black Lion V.

== Background ==
Operation Black Lion V immediately followed Operation Black Lion III.

On the evening of 23 October, in a preliminary movement, 50 Commando Raiders were parachuted in from Air America Twin Otters as pathfinders, to secure a landing zone six kilometers southwest of the Communist transshipment point of Lao Ngam. Savannakhet Unit of the Central Intelligence Agency (CIA) supplied a guerrilla regiment for an aerial invasion. Groupement Mobile 33 (GM 33), 1,200 strong, rode in on the helicopters of the 21st Special Operations Squadron (21st SOS) early on 23 October. On 26 October, they captured Lao Ngam. Over the following 25 days, GM 33 guerrillas would destroy three Communist tanks while sweeping south of the occupied transshipment point.

Nearby, the PAVN 9th Regiment still held Route 23. Beginning at the end of October, the RLG forces repeatedly attacked Laongam on Route 23. A Thai mercenary battalion drawn from ranger forces was turned back with heavy casualties. On 17 November, two other Thai battalions failed in an assault. However, a newly arrived battalion still lacking its heavy weapons took up the attack and was successful in pushing its way onto the Bolovens Plateau.

On 21 November, GM 33 was ordered southeastward to link up with the Thai mercenaries of Groupement Mobile 401 (GM 401) at Houei Sai. From there they would close in on the rear of the Communist force blocking the Royalist advance up Route 23. This pincer movement, centered on Paksong, was dubbed Operation Black Lion V.

== Operation Black Lion V ==
By 26 November, GM 33 was in Houei Sai. The 1,580 troops of GM 401 were hopscotched to a landing zone four kilometers northwest of Houei Sai via the helicopters of the 21st SOS. The two GMs, Thai and Lao, then pulled parallel sweeps toward Paksong, securing it by 6 December 1972.

By 15 December, GM 401 was deployed in a triangle around the town, with only light skirmishing. A commanders' briefing was held that day. It was hit by a Communist 85mm field gun shell, killing eight Royalists. Among the dead were a CIA paramilitary adviser, the deputy commander of GM 401, and a Thai battalion commander; the colonel in overall command of the operation was wounded.

On 19 December, GM 33 moved west on Route 23, approaching the 9th Regiment from behind. On 23 December, GM 33 managed to link up with the Thais who were forcing their way eastward. Meanwhile, back at Paksong, five Thai battalions garrisoned the town, with two more Thai battalions deployed along Route 23.

== Aftermath ==
In early February 1973, two battalions of the PAVN 9th Regiment and some supporting Dac Cong sappers moved south approaching Paksong. On 7 February, they occupied the Phou Nongkin high ground seven kilometers northeast of Paksong. Reports of Communist tanks appearing to stiffen the PAVN advance caused the Thai mercenaries to evacuate the town. The next day, a Royalist try at retaking the ruins was foiled. On 10 February, the MR 4 Special Battalion supplanted GM 33 at Tha Theng. GM 33 moved south, and overcame light opposition to reoccupy the remains of a flattened Paksong on 12 February.

For the next week, tactical air strikes against the Communists helped GM 33 maintain its position. There were two supporting artillery fire bases covering the town. Two more GMs were scheduled to arrive as reinforcements. The Vietnamese had faded from view, leaving the Pathet Lao as occupation troops for the pending ceasefire.

The ceasefire was to go into effect at 1200 hours 22 February 1973. At 1145 hours, the Communists opened a terrific bombardment on Paksong. By 1205 hours, the Thai troops were fleeing. By nightfall, PAVN troops had settled into the blasted village.
