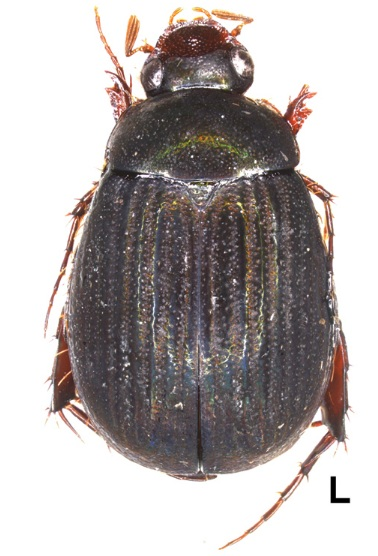

Scientific classification
- Kingdom: Animalia
- Phylum: Arthropoda
- Clade: Pancrustacea
- Class: Insecta
- Order: Coleoptera
- Suborder: Polyphaga
- Infraorder: Scarabaeiformia
- Family: Scarabaeidae
- Genus: Tetraserica
- Species: T. champassakana

Binomial name
- Tetraserica champassakana Fabrizi, Dalstein & Ahrens, 2019

= Tetraserica champassakana =

Species of beetle

Tetraserica champassakana is a species of beetle of the family Scarabaeidae. It is found in Laos and Vietnam.

== Description ==
Adults reach a length of about 7.2–8.8 mm. The surface of the labroclypeus and the disc of the frons are glabrous. The smooth area anterior to the eye is twice as wide as long.

== Etymology ==
The species name refers to its occurrence in Champasak province.
