= List of museums in Laos =

Museums in Laos

This is a list of museums in Laos.

- Champasak Provincial Museum
- Haw Phra Kaew
- Kaysone Phomvihane Museum
- Lao National Museum
- Luang Namtha Museum
- Royal Palace, Luang Prabang

== See also ==
- List of museums
