= Paksong district =

Paksong district ເມືອງປາກຊ່ອງ
- District
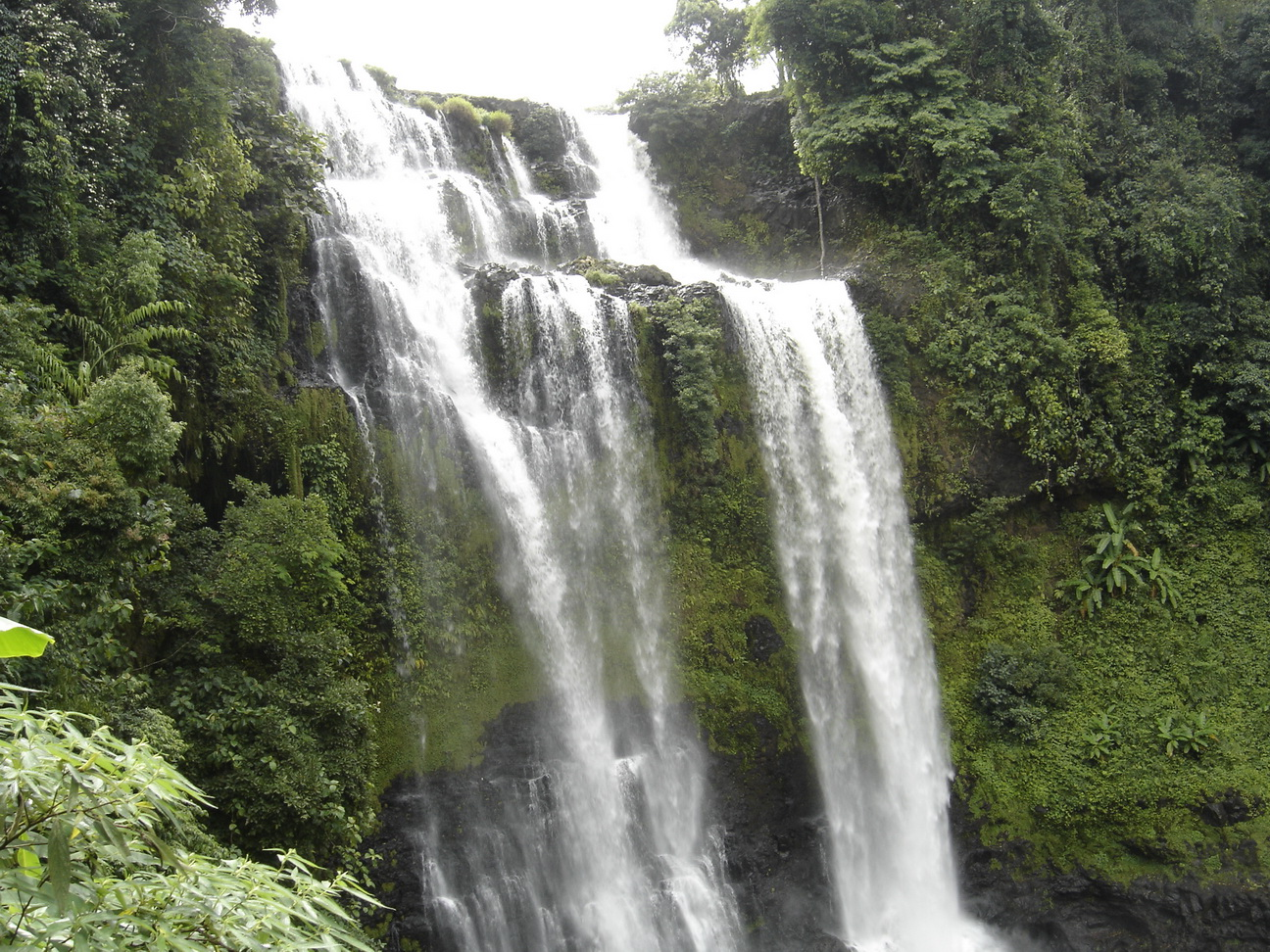
- Waterfall in Paksong district

- Country: Laos
- Province: Champasak province
- Time zone: UTC+7 (ICT)

Paksong is a district (muang) of Champasak province in southwestern Laos.

== Settlements ==
Paksong
