= Champasak (town) =

Champasak ເມືອງຈຳປາສັກ
- District
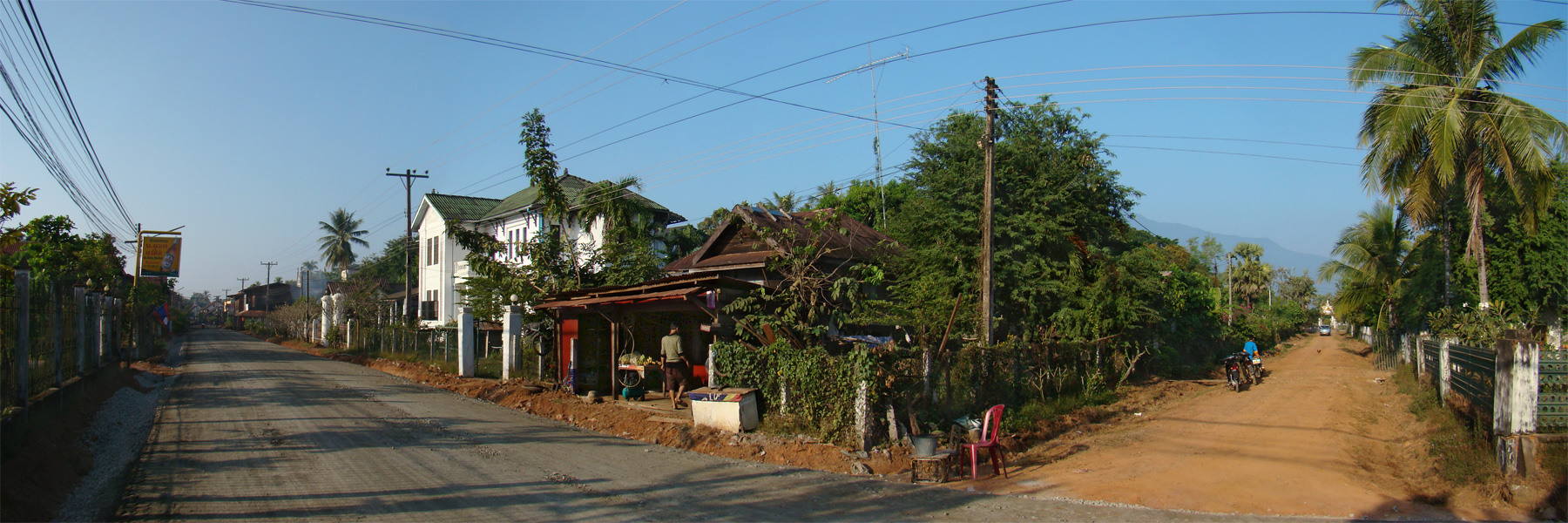
- Main street

- Coordinates: 14.84°N 105.75°E
- Country: Laos
- Province: Champasak province
- Time zone: UTC+7 (ICT)

Champasak or Muang Champassak (Lao: ຈຳປາສັກ [tɕàm pàː sák]) is a small town in southern Laos, on the west bank of the Mekong River about 40 km south of Pakse, the capital of Champasak Province. It is the seat of the Champasak district (muang).

The town was once the seat of the Kingdom of Champasak, an independent Lao state that was abolished by the French in 1945 when they created the Kingdom of Laos, but the last King of Champasak had his palace in Pakse. Today the town is very small, consisting mostly of guesthouses along the riverbank, catering to tourists visiting the Vat Phou temple ruins some 10 km away.
