= Ong Kommandam =

Ong Kommandam (also Ong Kommadam) was the confidant and successor of Ong Keo as the leader of the Mon-Khmer tribes of southern Laos in their struggle for independence from French and Lao rule. Ong Keo was assassinated in 1910 by the Commissioner of Salavan, Jacques Dauplay. Kommandam survived the attack, which added to his status, and he united the highland minorities of Southern Laos. An ethnic Alak, he claimed that the "Khom" (a general term for the Mon-Khmer hill tribes) were indigenous to the area and previously held much more prestige and glory, first when the Khmer Empire ruled them, and later when they were a part of the Kingdom of Lan Xang. As part of his resistance activities, he invented a secret script to convey messages, the Khom script. He continued the fight for independence from 1910 until 1936 when he was killed.
