= Operation Black Lion =

- Part of Laotian Civil War; Vietnam War
Date	15 June – 19 October 1972
Location	Southern Laos
Result	Royalist capture Salavan, fail to take Paksan

Belligerents
Kingdom of Laos; Supported by United States	North Vietnam; Supported by: Soviet Union; People's Republic of China

Units involved
Groupement Mobile 32; Groupement Mobile 33; Groupement Mobile 401; Three Thai mercenary battalions Royal Lao Air Force; Bataillon Infanterie 18	9th PAVN Regiment; 39th PAVN Regiment

Strength
Regimental-size	Regimental-size

Casualties and losses
Unknown	Est. 360

Operation Black Lion (15 June – 19 October 1972) was a Royal Lao Government counter-offensive against a People's Army of Vietnam thrust that cut the Kingdom of Laos in two at Khong Sedone during May 1972. Two regiments of Royalist military irregulars retaliated on 15 June 1972, attacking the Communist 39th Regiment in an air assault while Royal Lao Air Force tactical air strikes hammered the 39th. During the next month, the 39th Regiment would suffer an estimated 360 casualties and be rendered ineffective for attacks. On 18 July, they retreated, leaving a rear guard to be overrun.

Throughout the following months, the Royalists pushed eastward along Route 23 towards Vietnam to capture Laongam. Then, on the nights of 14/15 and 18/19 October 1972, Communist PT-76 tanks struck four Royalist Thai mercenary battalions holding Laongam. All the Thais except the regimental staff abandoned the town on 19 October; however, an AC-130 Spectre gunship repelled the Communist attack. Two Thai battalions returned to form a weak defense.

== Overview ==
The Ho Chi Minh Trail was central to the People's Army of Vietnam (PAVN) strategy for the conquest of South Vietnam during the Second Indochina War. North Vietnamese victory depended on the supplies and reinforcements delivered by the Trail, which was located in the Kingdom of Laos. An ongoing air campaign by the United States striking the Trail had little perceptible effect on the Communist logistics effort.

A series of Central Intelligence Agency-backed intrusions from Military Region 3 (MR 3) and Military Region 4 (MR 4) of Laos during 1969 and 1970 failed to interdict the Trail. The massive Operation Lam Son 719 assault staged in February 1971 failed to cut it. Nevertheless, Central Intelligence Agency (CIA) backed Laotian guerrillas and Royal Lao Army (RLA) military irregulars made further attempts at severing the Communist logistical lines of communication.

== Background ==
By the end of April 1972, the Royal Lao Government (RLG) had lost control of the Bolovens Plateau and its overwatch of the Trail to the invading People's Army of Vietnam (PAVN). A renewed PAVN 9th Regiment captured the village of Laongam and advanced nine kilometers along Route 23 into Royalist territory. Also, during the third week in May, the PAVN 39th Regiment unexpectedly made a rainy season advance to occupy the town of Khong Sedone on the banks of the Mekong River. This move cut Route 13, between Savannakhet and Pakxe, thus severing the only highway between the two Lao Military Region headquarters. It also essentially divided Laos in two, and menaced Thai sovereignty.

Loss of the Mekong River town was too great an affront to Lao nationhood to be borne. Deputy Minister Sisouk na Champassak was forwarded to Pakxe by Prime Minister Souvanna Phouma. Champassak was to remain in Pakxe—barring cabinet meetings in Vientiane—overseeing Royalist efforts to regain Khong Sedone and block attacks on Pakxe. King Savang Vatthana believed the operation should retake Paksong in the Communists' rear, cutting their supply lines into Khong Sedone.

The RLG's immediate reaction was the dispatch of partially trained Bataillon Voluntaire 44 (BV 44) from Military Region 4, backed by four 105mm howitzers to retake Khong Sedone. When the volunteer battalion was unsuccessful, the undertrained regimental-sized Groupement Mobile 41 (GM 41) also tried and failed. These two failures precipitated Operation Black Lion.

== Operation Black Lion ==
The Royalists had an artillery fire base sited at the road junction where east-west Route 23 from Vietnam intersected the Laotian north-south Route 13 near Khong Sedone. In early June, the Royalists began reinforcing the position with Thai mercenary troops returning from a loan to Military Region 2. Four battalions left the Plain of Jars on 12 and 13 June; after being re-equipped, they were stationed at the critical intersection. In late June, they were joined by a fifth Thai battalion. In early July, a 4.2 inch mortar was added to the garrison. However, the Royalist forces had secured no foothold on the Bolovens Plateau.

In early June, Savannakhet Unit of the CIA planned Operation Black Lion to retake Khong Sedone. On 15 June 1972, Groupement Mobile 32 (GM 32) was helilifted into Pakxe Site 47, unloading on the fly and without their heavy weapons company. This placed GM 32 11 kilometers north of Khong Sedone. Only two hours after re-forming their ranks, GM 32 moved south toward their objective. Less than two kilometers out, they ran headon into the 3rd Battalion of the PAVN 39th Regiment. After intense fighting, the arrival of tactical air support for the Royalists drove the Vietnamese out of the way.

On 16 June, Groupement Mobile 33 (GM 33) was landed seven kilometers west of Pakxe Site 47. It divided in two to assault differing objectives. Group Alpha was directed at the mountaintop of Phou Khong. Group Bravo was targeted at Route 13. The Communist defensive positions were laid out with a basic weakness; while antiaircraft guns and artillery pieces were sited on one bank of the Se Done River, most of their infantry protection was stationed on the other.

On 17 June, GM 32 was six kilometers north of Khong Sedone. On 18 June, Alpha Group of GM 33 was repulsed in its attack on Phou Khong, being struck by artillery and mortar fire. Bravo Group of GM 33 unsuccessfully assaulted Ban Napheng, three kilometers north of Khong Sedone. On 19 June, two battalions of GM 32 took Ban Napheng, then quickly moved into a vacated Khong Sedone. The PAVN forces had withdrawn westward to a deserted RLA bivouac.

GM 32 remained static in Khong Sedone into the first week of July. Communist artillery fire began to fall on GM 32. Meanwhile, troops from the 39th Regiment conquered Ban Napheng. The attacking Royalists took advantage of the poor Communist dispositions to inflict an estimated 300 PAVN casualties. However, during the second week in July, intercepted Communist signals traffic disclosed that the PAVN 39th Regiment had orders to hold the old RLA camp at all costs. GM 32 was ordered into the attack, with the Royal Lao Air Force (RLAF) delivering close air support and a 75mm recoilless rifle platoon firing support. Even though intercepted radio messages revealed the PAVN was suffering heavy losses, the Communists hung on until 18 July before staging a fighting withdrawal over Phou Khong. Encroaching Royalist irregulars killed the PAVN defensive rearguard in their bunkers. The guerrillas also reported finding 60 fragmentary corpses of Communist soldiers killed by RLAF strikes. The PAVN 39th Regiment was through as a fighting force.

As GM 32 had launched its assault, GM 33 was redirected from its attack on Phou Khong to recapture Ban Napheng. Having done so within a week, GM 33 moved three kilometers north of the village, following in trail of the withdrawing PAVN.

As July turned into August 1972, GM 32 pursued the depleted PAVN 39th Regiment 15 kilometers northeastward. The Royalists destroyed five tons of Communist war materiel along the way. On 12 August, the Royalist regiment took Moung Wapi. On 15 August, it was relieved by allies of the Royalists, Bataillon Infanterie 18 (BI 18) from Forces Armées Neutralistes.

In July, this task force attacked eastward along Route 23. The PAVN 9th Regiment held firm at Laongam. The Royalists established a new fire base with four artillery pieces halfway between Laongam and the 13/23 intersection. An additional Thai battalion reinforced the Royalist assault force. A renewed attack captured Laongam on 5 September, but could push no further.

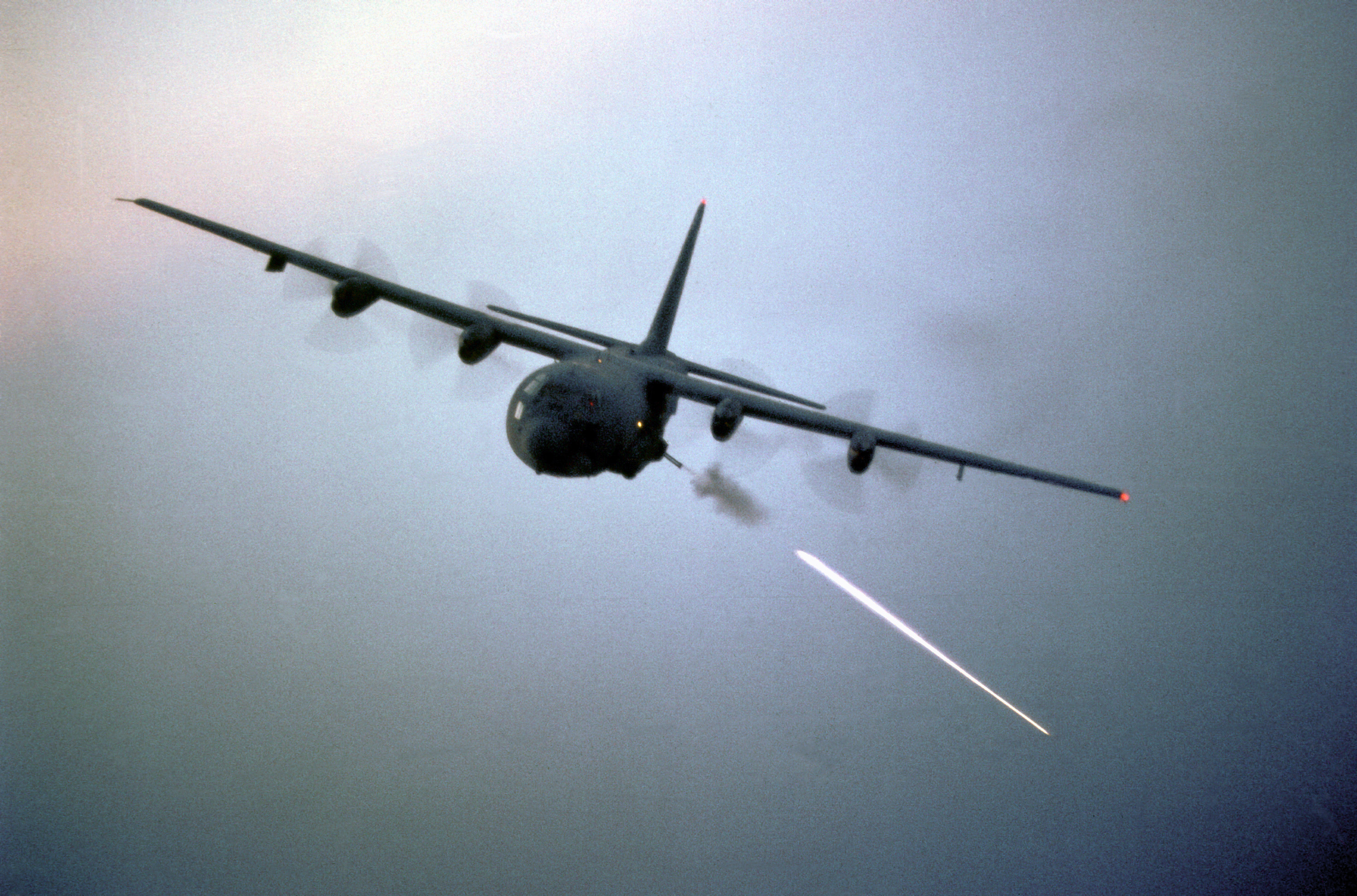
An AC-130 gunship mission was crucial in repelling communist attacks on BC 401.

On 25 September, in mid-battle, three of the Thai battalions in Laongam were designated as constituting a new regiment, Groupement Mobile 401 (GM 401). One Thai battalion secured the new intermediate fire base. A sixth Thai battalion having joined the operation, there were two battalions free to attempt to move eastward along Route 23 into Communist territory.

On 14 October, four PAVN PT-76 tanks supported infantry attacking the Thais. Two of the PT-76s were destroyed on 15 October, and the Vietnamese withdrew. On the 18th, the PAVN struck again. By 0100 hours on the 19th, all the Thai infantry was in full flight, as GM 401 abandoned its headquarters staff and the new fire support base. The Communists overran the fire base, destroying three of four Royalist howitzers. An AC-130 Spectre gunship fire mission forced a Communist withdrawal and saved the 18 man headquarters.

Two of the Thai battalions that had fled returned to establish a feeble defensive line while the Royalists planned another offensive.
