= Operation Black Lion III =

- Part of Laotian Civil War; Vietnam War
Date	18 October 1972 – 22 February 1973
Location	Southern Laotian panhandle
Result	Royalist capture Salavan, fail to take Paksan

Belligerents
Kingdom of Laos; Supported by United States	North Vietnam; Supported by: Soviet Union; People's Republic of China

Units involved
Commando Raiders; Groupement Mobile 41; Groupement Mobile 42; Groupement Mobile 43; Groupement Mobile 33; 21st Special Operations Squadron	9th PAVN Regiment

Strength
Regimental-size	Regimental-size

Casualties and losses
Unknown	Unknown

Operation Black Lion III (18 October 1972 – 22 February 1973) was one of the last Royal Lao Army offensives of the Laotian Civil War. Aimed at regaining the Lao towns of Paksong and Salavan and their associated airfields for Lao usage, the three regiment offensive captured Salavan on 20 October 1972, and Paksong shortly thereafter. Although the besieged Royalists would hold through early February 1973, they would be routed by PAVN tanks and infantry just before the 22 February 1973 ceasefire ended the war.

== Overview ==
The Ho Chi Minh Trail was crucial for the People's Army of Vietnam (PAVN) strategy for conquering South Vietnam during the Second Indochina War. North Vietnamese victory depended on the logistic supply line of the Trail, which was located in the Kingdom of Laos. An ongoing air campaign by the United States seeking to destroy the Trail had little perceptible effect on the Communist resupply effort.

The Central Intelligence Agency (CIA) backed a number of guerrilla intrusions onto the Trail in an attempt to cut supplies going into South Vietnam. The huge Operation Lam Son 719 attack of February 1971 proved insufficient to sever the supply conduit of the Trail. Nevertheless, after these failures the CIA continued its attempts to disrupt the Trail's activities. Among them were a series of similarly named offensives: Operation Black Lion, Operation Black Lion III, and Operation Black Lion V.

== Background ==
Even as Operation Black Lion ground on, two Royalist irregular regiments from Military Region 4 (MR 4) were undergoing retraining and re-equipping. Both Groupement Mobile 41 (GM 41) and Groupement Mobile 42 (GM 42) graduated in early October 1972. They were promptly earmarked for an attack on Salavan, as part of a land grab prior to an expected ceasefire. The operation was dubbed Black Lion III, and was a rerun of the previous year's Operation Sayasila. With truce talks in progress, the military emphasis was on a land grab to gain territory before a ceasefire ended the secret war.

== Activities ==
On the night of 18 October 1972, a Royalist Commando Raiders team made a low level parachute drop from an Air America Twin Otter to secure a landing zone near Salavan. The following morning, the 21st Special Operations Squadron (21st SOS) began helilifting Groupement Mobile 42 (GM 42) into rice paddies adjoining the Salavan airstrip on its westward side. Although the first contingent landed without resistance, in a subsequent lift seven of the 21st SOS's CH-53s suffered battle damage. Air America had to pick up the airlift duties as the 21st SOS withdrew for repairs.

While ferrying in troops in the third lift, an Air America H-34 was shot down in flames, killing a CIA adviser and his operational assistant. The last battalion of GM 41 would be lifted in on 20 October by hastily repaired helicopters of the 21st SOS. They began inserting Groupement Mobile 42 (GM 42) the same day.

== Result ==
Having been battered in the Khong Sedone fighting in Operation Black Lion, the PAVN 9th Regiment retreated eastwards from the Operation Black Lion V forces, leaving Salavan to the Royalists.

== Aftermath ==
Operation Black Lion V, aimed at exploiting the results of the two prior Black Lion offensives, was staged beginning 22 October 1972.

The Royalist regiments of Black Lion III enjoyed three weeks of quiet after taking Salavan. However, in mid-November, the PAVN 9th Regiment arrived, having retreated from the encroaching Royalist troops of Operation Black Lion V.

On 8 December, the PAVN shelled GMs 41 and 42 while attacking with infantry. A 122mm shell hit the GM 41 headquarters, sparing the regimental commander but killing most of his staff. The Royalists held.

The Royalist response was to helicopter in Groupement Mobile 43 (GM 43) to capture the Tha Theng supply point supporting the 9th Regiment. GM 43 took the town without fighting. However, the Royalist move failed to starve the Communist offensives of supplies; they continued to assault Paksong and Salavan. In fact, 3,200 Communist artillery rounds impacted Salavan on the evening of 15 December 1972, followed by assaults on the town from all directions. Several Communist antiaircraft guns were moved in to close the Salavan airstrip on 15 December.

After weeks of fighting, on 9 January 1973 the two Royalist regiments began to retreat to the west. On 12 January, Groupement Mobile 33 (GM 33)—inserted from neighboring Military Region 3—route marched from Paksong to Tha Theng to relieve Groupement Mobile 43 (GM 43), arriving on the 13th. GM 43 then circled north in an anti-clockwise direction to assault Salavan from the east. GMs 41 and 42 moved in from the west. The Royalists reclaimed part of the town as the fighting continued through early February. However, the PAVN reinforced with tanks. The Royalists retreated back down Route 16 to Khong Sedone on the Mekong River. There the ceasefire found them on 22 February 1973.
