= Champasak province =

Province of Laos

Champasak province ແຂວງ ຈຳປາສັກ
- Province
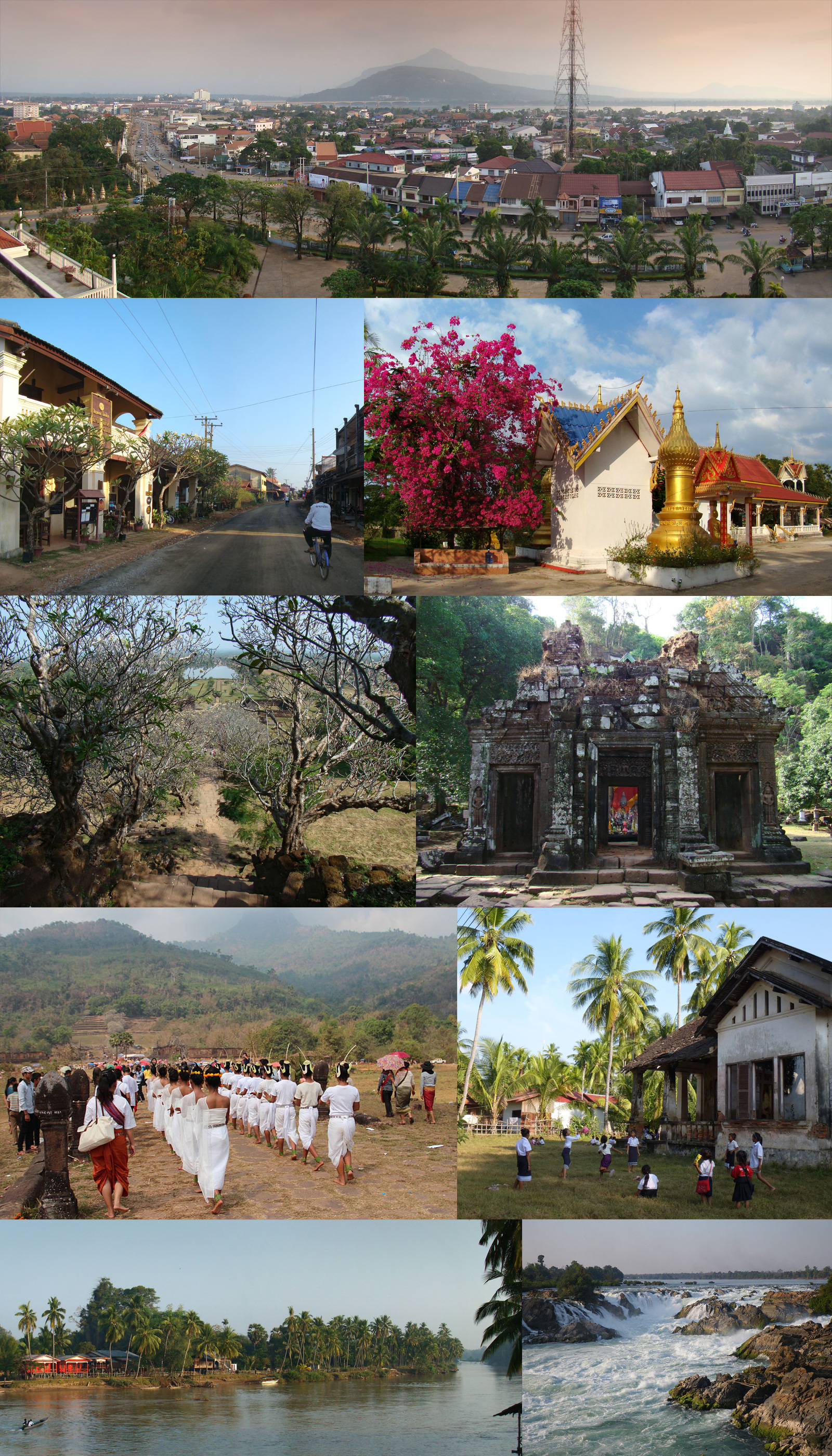

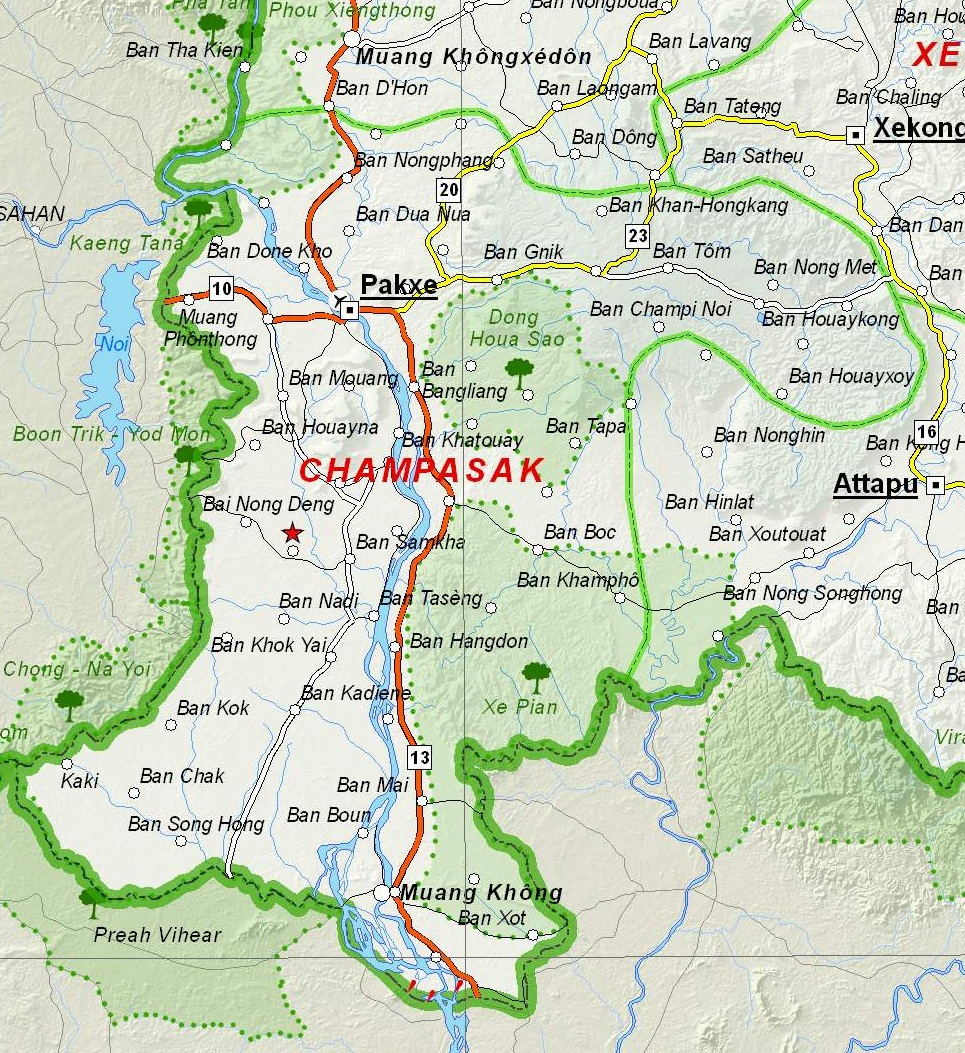
- Map of Champasak province

- Location of Champasak province in Laos
- Coordinates: 14.8825°N 105.8425°E
- Country: Laos
- Capital: Pakse

Area
  - Total: 15,415 km^{2} (5,952 sq mi)

Population (2020 census)
  - Total: 752,688
  - Density: 48.828/km^{2} (126.46/sq mi)
- Time zone: UTC+7 (ICT)
- ISO 3166 code: LA-CH
- HDI (2022): ▲0.612 medium · 6th

Champasak (or Champassak, Champasack – Lao: ຈຳປາສັກ [t͡ɕàm pàː sák]) is a province in southwestern Laos. It is 1 of the 3 principalities that succeeded the kingdom of Lan Xang. As of the 2015 census, it had a population of 694,023. The capital is Pakse, and the province takes its name from Champasak, the former capital of the Kingdom of Champasak. Champasak is bordered by Salavan province to the north, Sekong province to the northeast, Attapeu province to the east, Cambodia to the south, and Thailand to the west. The Mekong River forms part of the border with neighboring Thailand and contains Si Phan Don ('Four Thousand Islands') in the south of the province, on the border with Cambodia.

Champasak has played a role in the history of Siam and Laos, with battles taking place in and around Champasak. Its cultural heritage includes temple ruins and French colonial architecture. Champasak has some 20 wats (temples), such as Wat Phou, Wat Luang, and Wat Tham Fai. The province's waterfalls are tourist attractions, as were the local freshwater dolphins which have died out. (A surviving population still exists in Cambodia.)

== Geography ==
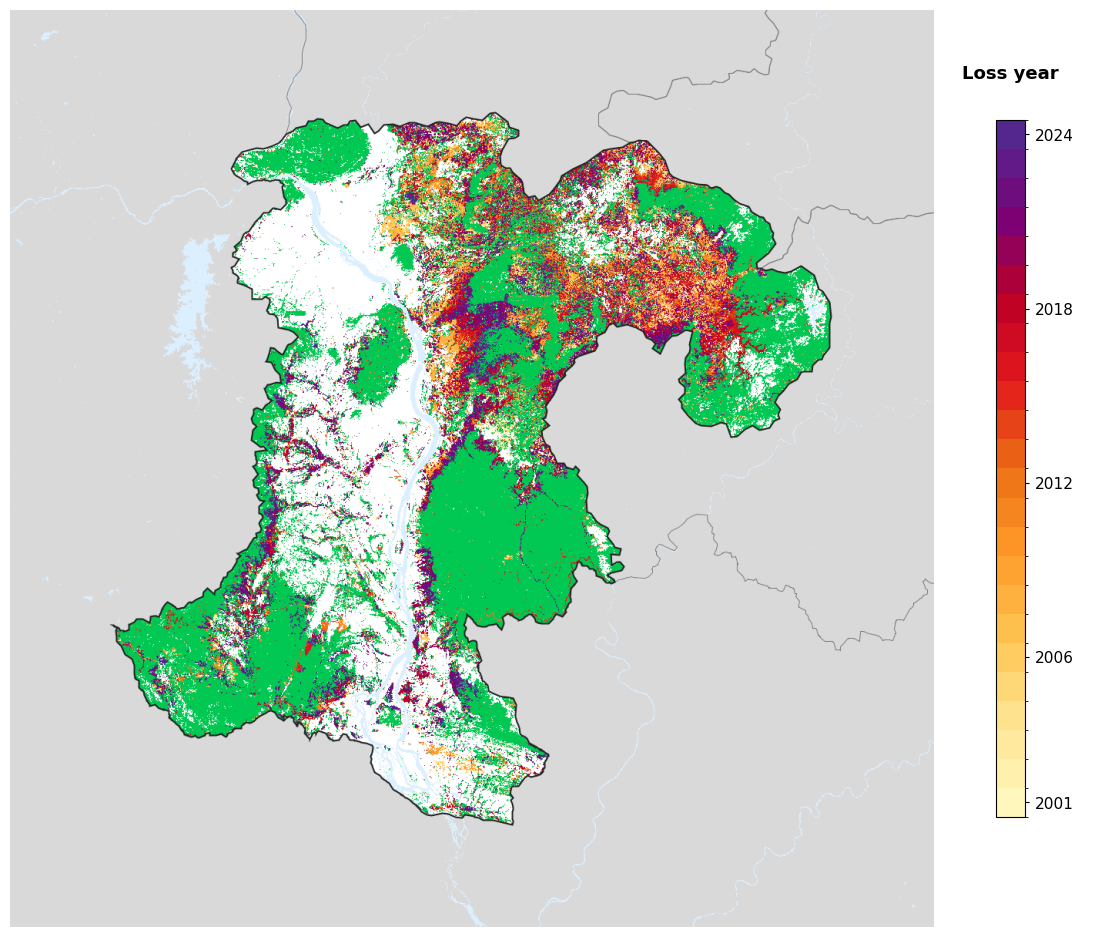
Tree-cover loss year in Champasak, 2001-2024, from the Global Forest Change dataset.

Champasak province covers an area of 15,415 km^{2} (5,952 sq mi). The Mekong forms part of the border with neighboring Thailand and, after a bend projecting westward, turns east and flows southeasterly through the province down to Cambodia. Champasak can be reached from Thailand through Sirindhorn District's Chong Mek border crossing, to Vang Tao on the Laotian side, from where the highway leads east towards the provincial capital, Pakse. The capital is on a highway, Route 13, and the French legacy can be seen in the city's architecture.

Si Phan Don (Four Thousand Islands) is on a stretch of the Mekong north of the border with Cambodia. Of these islands, Don Khong is the largest and has a number of villages, temples, and caves. A French-built bridge on the abandoned railway line provides the link with two smaller islands, Don Det and Don Khon.

There are waterfalls in the province such as the Tad Somphamit (or Liphi) Waterfall, at Don Khon to the west of Ban Khon village. Below the falls in the calmer waters of the Mekong the fresh water dolphins can be seen. The Khone Phapheng Falls to the east of Don Khon, also on the Mekong, cascade along a broad mouth of rock slopes in a curvilinear pattern. The 120 m (390 ft) Tad Fane Waterfall (or Dong Hua Sao) in the Bolaven Plateau is the country's highest waterfall. It is created by the Champi and Prakkoot streams which originate at about 1,000 m (3,300 ft) above sea level. The plateau is east of Pakse.

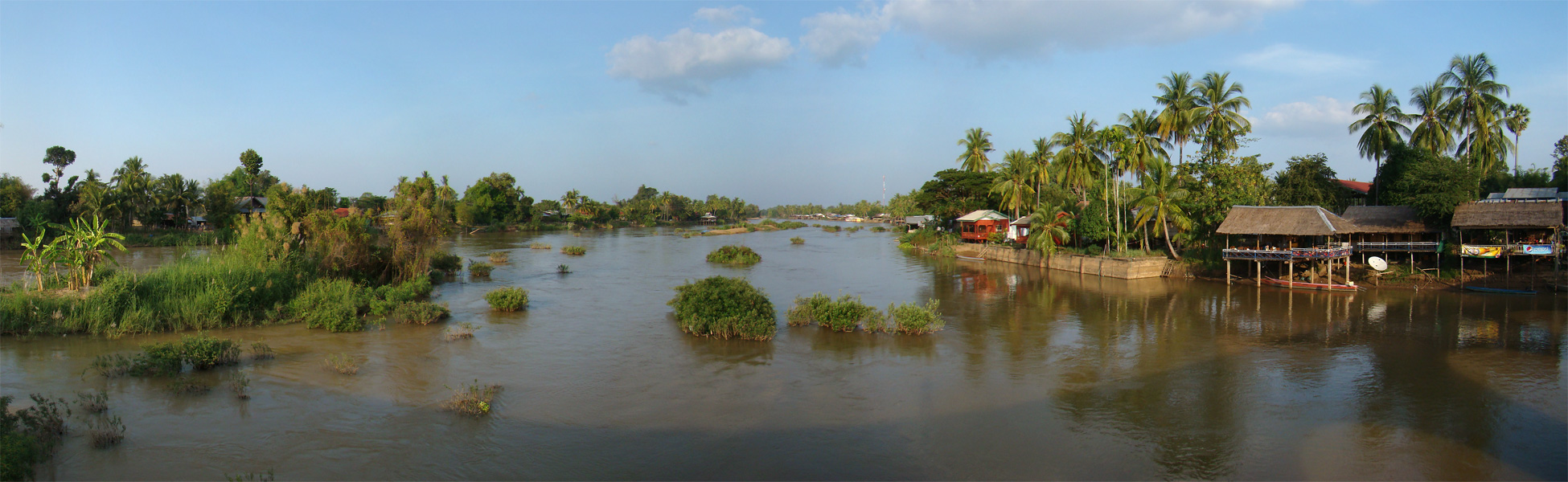
Si Phan Don

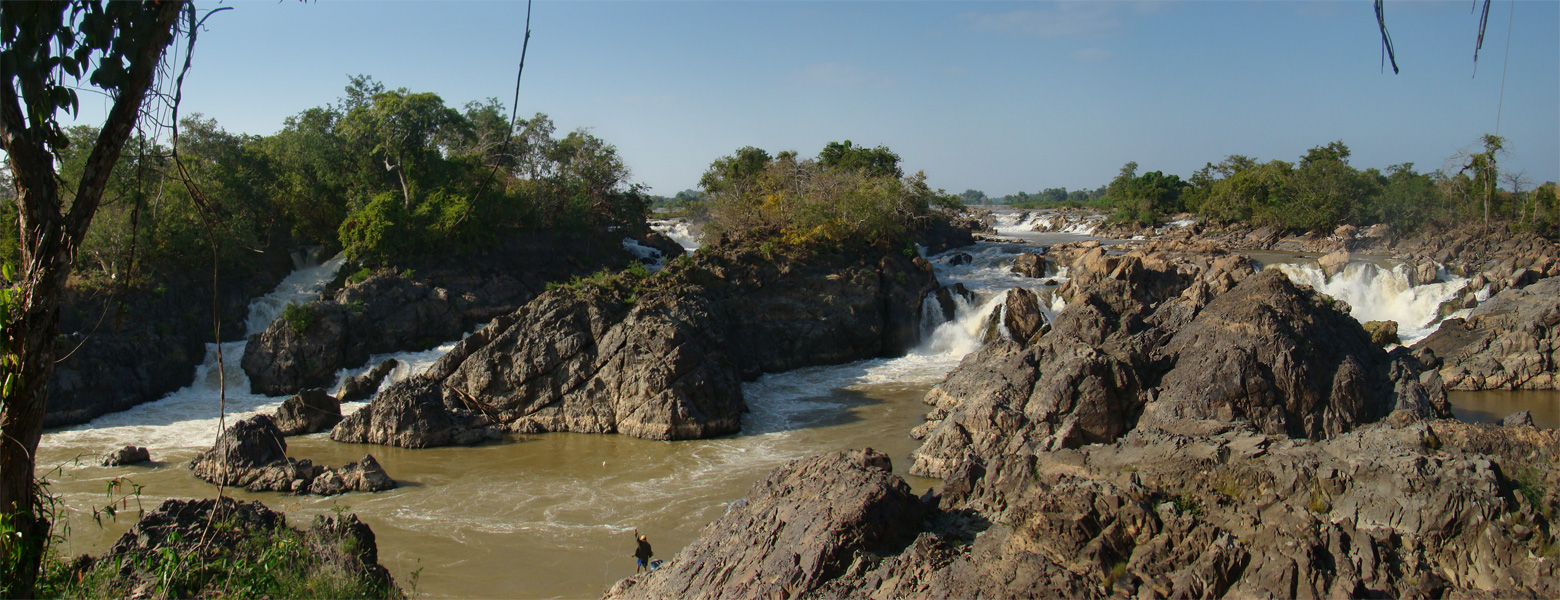
Liphi Waterfall

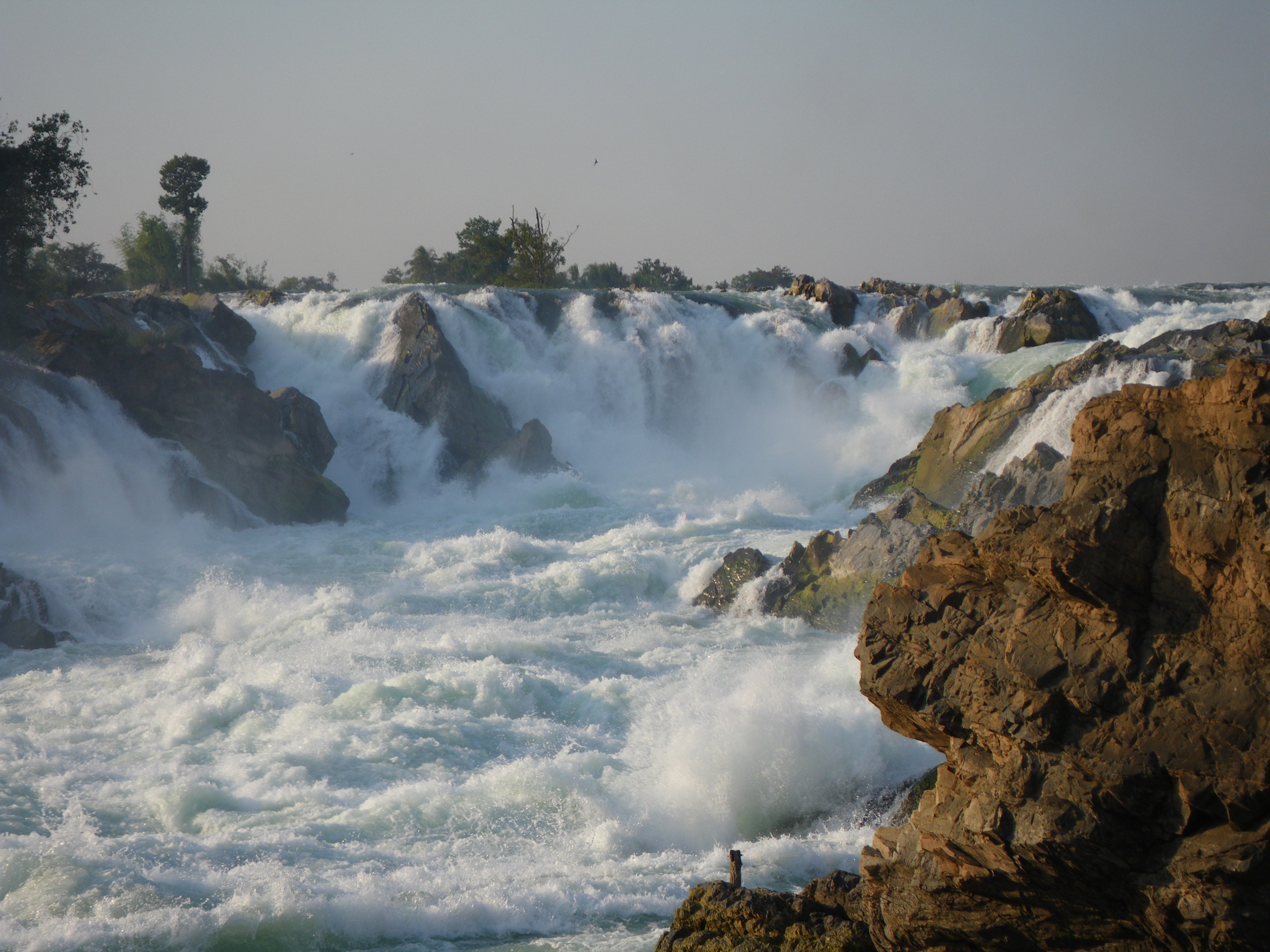
Khone Phapheng Falls

=== Protected areas ===
Xe Pian National Biodiversity Conservation Area (NBCA) lies in the southeastern part of the province, while the Dong Hua Sao National Protected Area is in the eastern area. The Center for Protection and Conservation of freshwater dolphins is on the Cambodian border. These freshwater dolphins are known locally as pakha in Lao, and are found on this particular stretch of the Mekong River. Hire boats are available to see these dolphins, either from Ban Khon or Ban Veunkham (at the southern end of the islands).

The Mekong Channel from Phou Xiang Thong to Siphandon Important Bird Area (IBA) is 34,200 ha (85,000 acres) in size. A portion of the IBA (10,000 hectares) overlaps with the 120,000 ha (300,000 acres) Phou Xieng Thong National Protected Area. The IBA encompasses 2 provinces, Champasak and Salavan. The IBA is at an elevation of 40–50 m (130–160 ft). Its topography consists of earth banks, rocky banks, rocky islands, sandbars, low vegetated islands, rocky islets, and sandy beaches. Avifauna include nesting little terns, river lapwings, river terns, small pratincoles and wire-tailed swallows.

The 36,650 ha (90,600 acres) Phou Xiang Thong IBA is in the Phou Xiengthong NBCA. This IBA spans 2 provinces, Champasak and Salavan. The IBA is at an elevation of 40–500 m (130–1,640 ft). The topography consists of low hills, lowlands, rivers, and seasonal streams. Habitat is characterized by dry deciduous tropical forest, moist deciduous tropical forest, semi-evergreen tropical rainforest, mixed deciduous forest, dry dipterocarp forest, and open rocky savanna. Avifauna include the grey-faced tit-babbler, green peafowl, red-collared woodpecker, and Siamese fireback.

=== Administrative divisions ===
The province is made up of the following districts:

Map	Code	Name	Lao script
	16-01	Pakse District	ເມືອງປາກເຊ
	16-02	Sanasomboun District	ເມືອງຊະນະສົມບູນ
	16-03	Batiengchaleunsouk District	ເມືອງບາຈຽງຈະເລີນສຸກ
	16-04	Paksong District	ເມືອງປາກຊ່ອງ
	16-05	Pathouphone District	ເມືອງປະທຸມພອນ
	16-06	Phonthong District	ເມືອງໂພນທອງ
	16-07	Champassack District	ເມືອງຈຳປາສັກ
	16-08	Soukhoumma District	ເມືອງສຸຂຸມາ
	16-09	Mounlapamok District	ເມືອງມູນລະປະໂມກ
	16-10	Khong District	ເມືອງໂຂງ

== Demographics ==
The population of the province, from the 2015 census, is 694,023. The ethnic composition consists mainly of Lao, and also Chieng, Inthi, Kaseng, Katang, Kate, Katu, Kien Lavai, Laven, Nge, Nyaheun, Oung, Salao, Suay, Tahang, and Tahoy ethnic groups, and Khmer. Near the border between Thailand and Cambodia are Chams known as the Laotian Chams.

== Economy ==
The economic output of the province consists primarily of agricultural products—especially production of coffee, tea, and rattan. It is “one of the most important coffee producing areas of Laos” along with Salavan and Sekong provinces. Pakse is the main trade and travel link with Thailand, Cambodia, and Vietnam. Following the building of the Lao Nippon bridge across the Mekong at Pakse in 2002, trade with Thailand has multiplied several fold. The bridge lies at the junction of roads to the Bolaven Plateau in the east, Thailand in the west, and Si Phan Don to the south. Improved infrastructure has led to an increase in tourism since the 1990s. The weaving centres of Ban Saphai and Don Kho are 18 km (11 mi) from Pakse. The Jhai Coffee Farmers Cooperative, headquartered at the provincial capital, operates on the Bolaven Plateau. The Bolaven Plateau has rubber, tobacco, peaches, pineapple, and rice production.

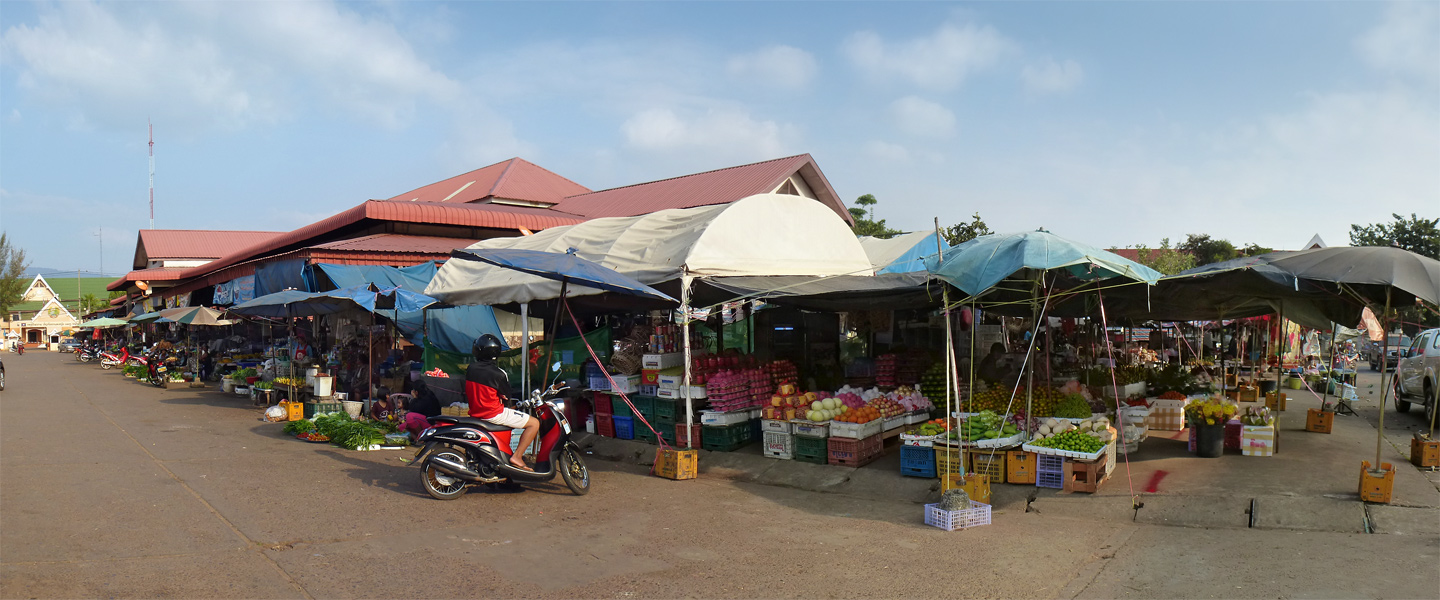
Pakse market

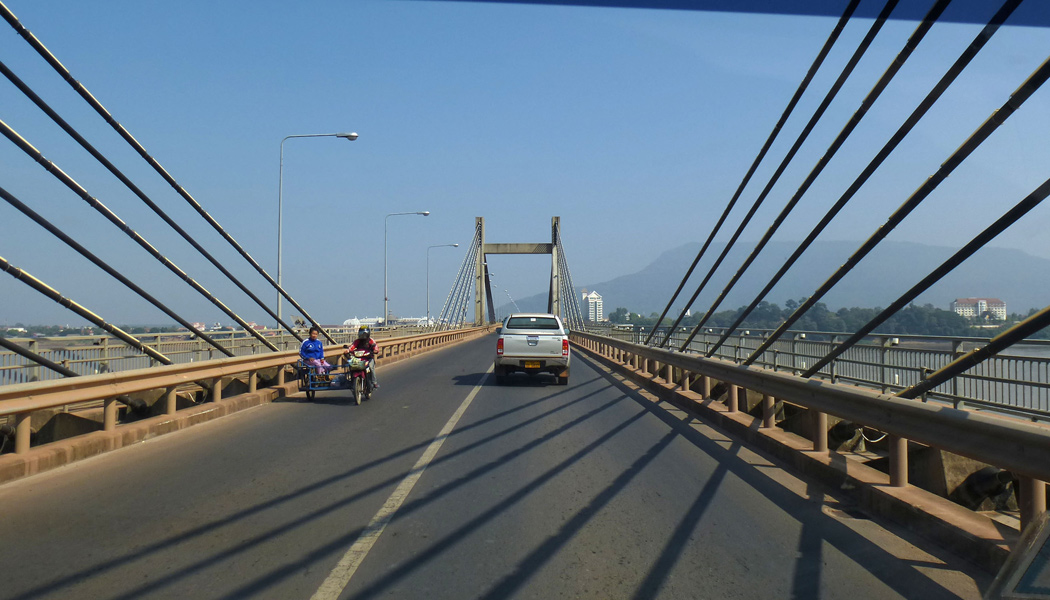
The Lao Nippon bridge

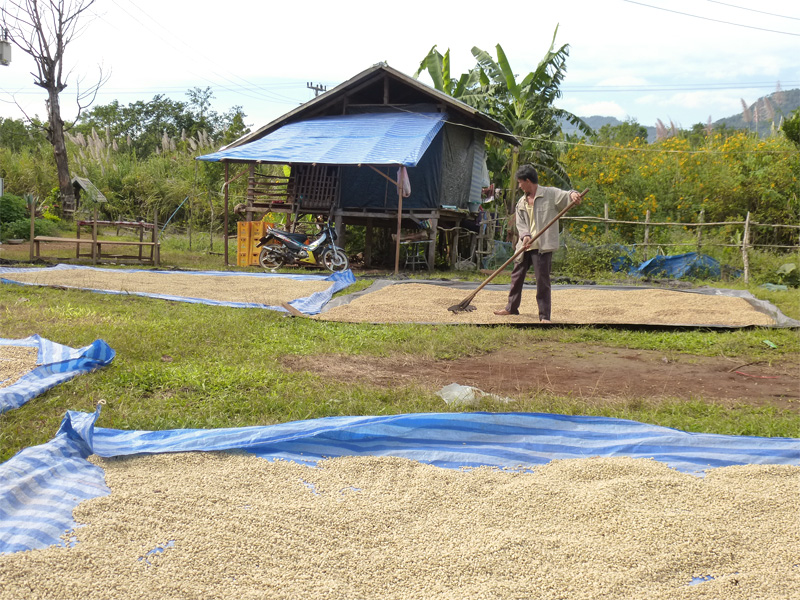
Coffee drying on the Bolaven Plateau

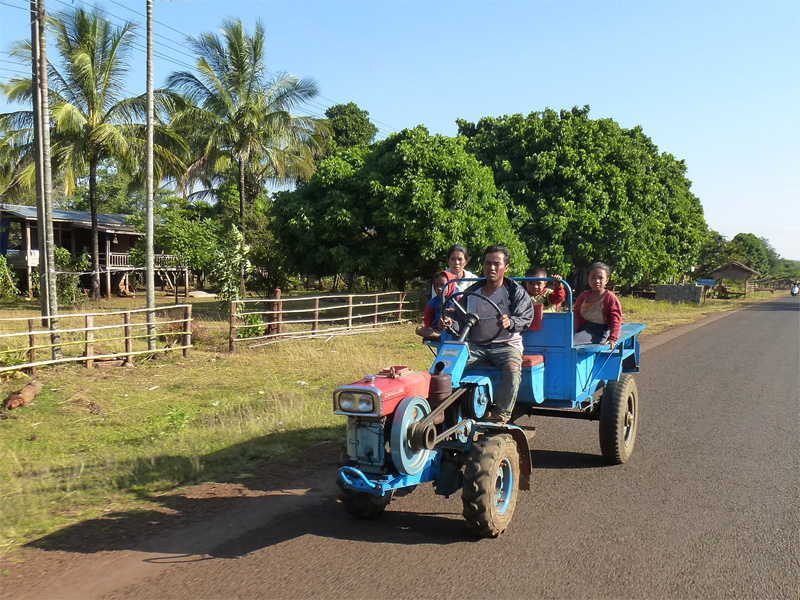
Lao family on a 'Chinese water buffalo' in Champasak province

== Landmarks ==
Champasak has some 20 wats (temples). The Khmer ruins of Wat Phou are in the capital of the Champasak District. They are on the Phu Kao mountain slopes, about 6 km (3.7 mi) from Champasak District and about 45 km (28 mi) to the south of Pakse along the Mekong River. Wat Phou was designated a UNESCO World Heritage Site on 14 December 2001. It is the second such site in Laos. The temple complex, built in the Khmer style, overlooks the Mekong River and was a Hindu temple in the Khmer Empire. At the same location are the ruins of other pre-Angkor monuments. Wat Phou Asa is a Hindu-Khmer pagoda, built on flat rock on Phou Kao Klat Ngong Mount in Pathoumphone District. It can be reached via Route 13, south of Pakse, and then by foot from Ban Klat Ngong. The pagoda was built by the Khmers and is in a ruined state. It is under renovation. Wat Luang and Wat Tham Fai were built in 1935. There is a monastic school and a Buddha foot imprint shrine in Wat Pha Bhat and Wat Tham Fai; religious festivals are held within an open area.

Tormor Rocky Channel is the 15th National Heritage Site in Laos; it is about 11 km (6.8 mi) southeast of Wat Phou Champasak on the left bank of the Mekong. The pathway to the building is lined with columns of sandstone. There is a chamber with doors in the front and rear and windows on 2 sides. Inscriptions imply the site is related to Wat Phou Champasak. An archeological site is at Pu Asa on a mountain top. Kiat Ngong village is noted for its medicinal plants and forest products.

The Champasak Historical Heritage Museum in Pakse provides insight into the history of Laos and its cultural and artistic heritage. In Wat Amath, treasures dating back to the Stone Age can be seen. The museum has artifacts, documents, 3 Dong Son bronze drums, 7th century lintels made of sandstone, textile and jewelry collections including items such as iron ankle bracelets, ivory ear plugs, musical instruments, a stele in Thai script (15th to 18th century), a water jar of 11th or 12th century vintage, a Shiva linga, a model of Wat Phu Champasak, Buddha images, and American weaponry. The province was the site of Laos's first railway, the Don Det – Don Khon narrow gauge railway on Don Det and Don Khon Islands.

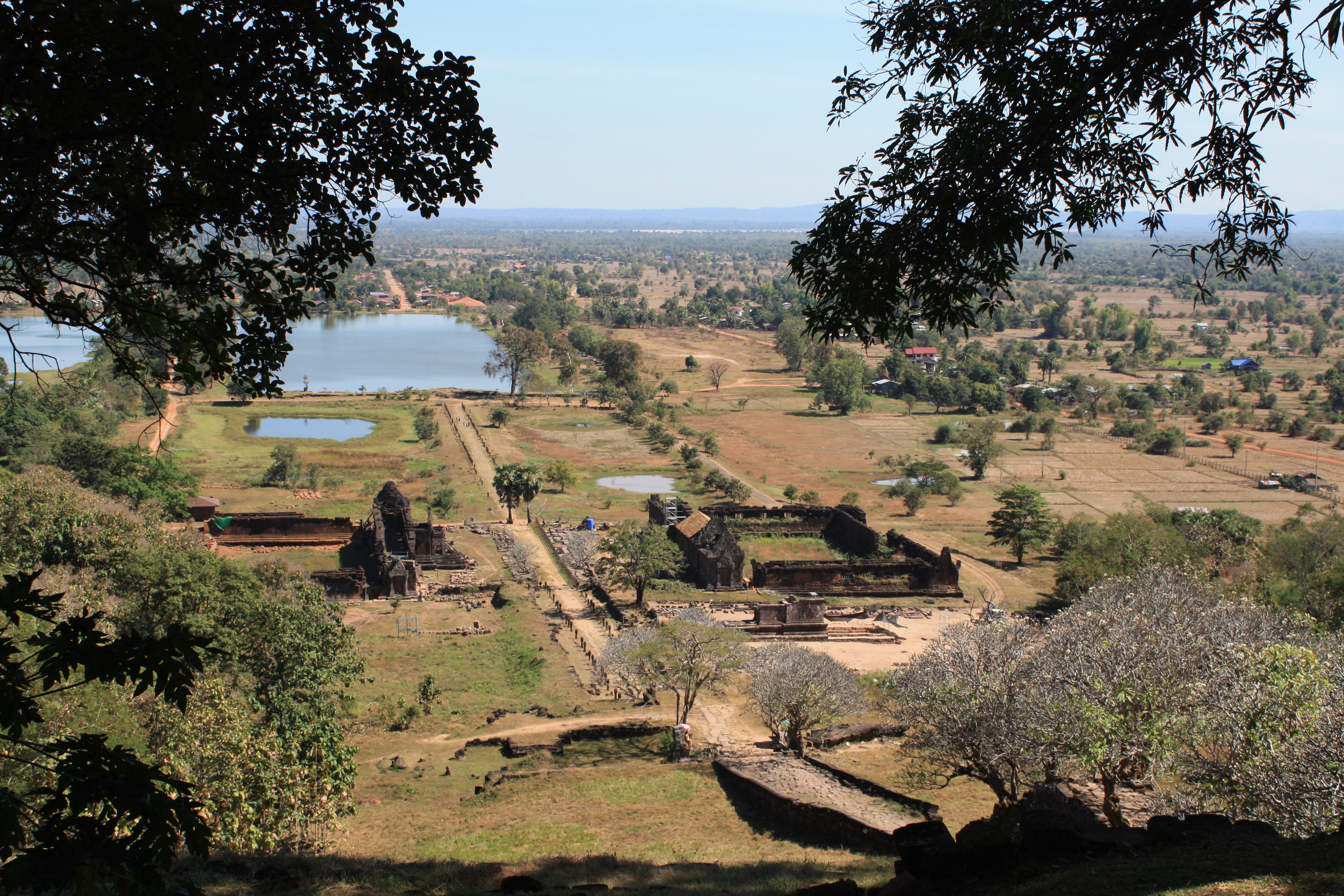
View from near the top of Wat Phou

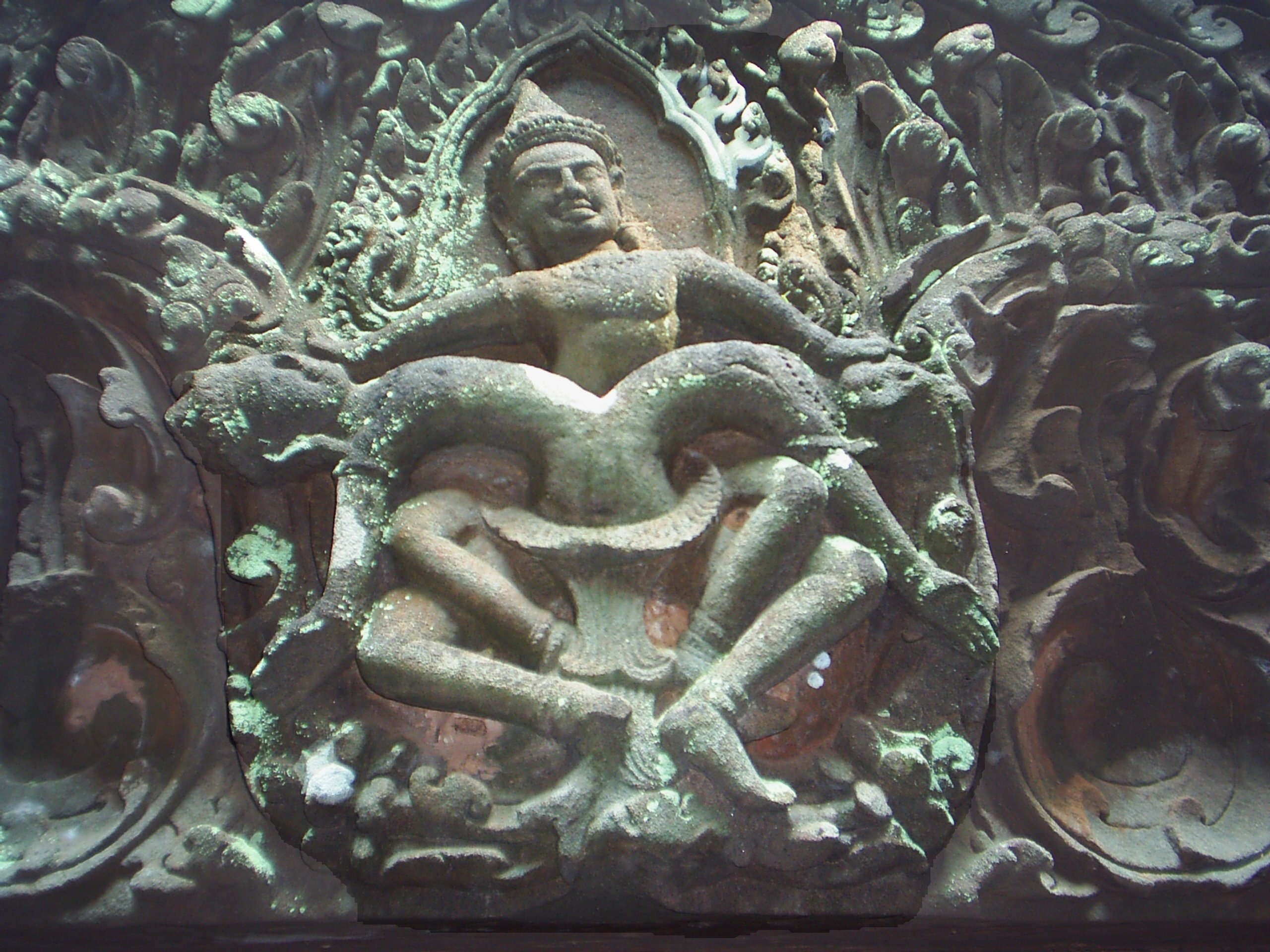
A lintel showing Krishna killing Kaliya, on the south wall of the Wat Phou sanctuary

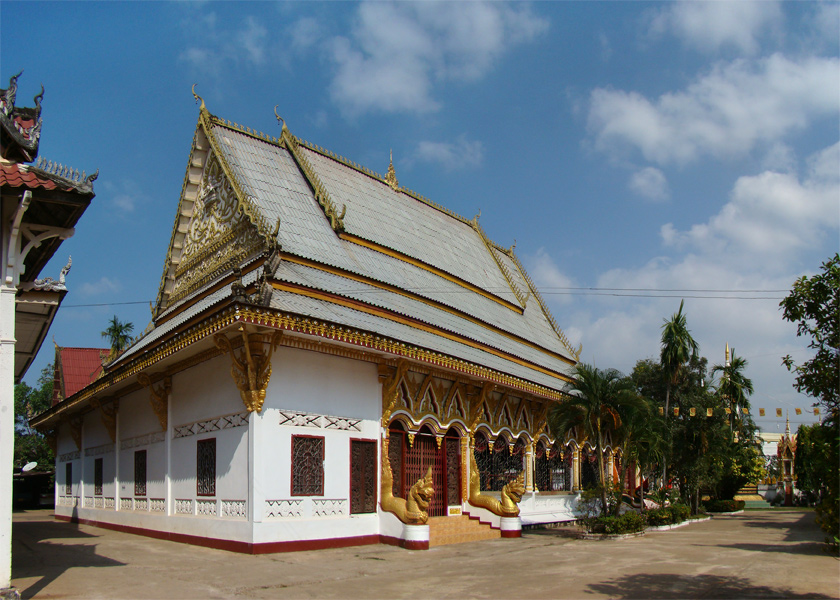
Wat Luang in Pakse

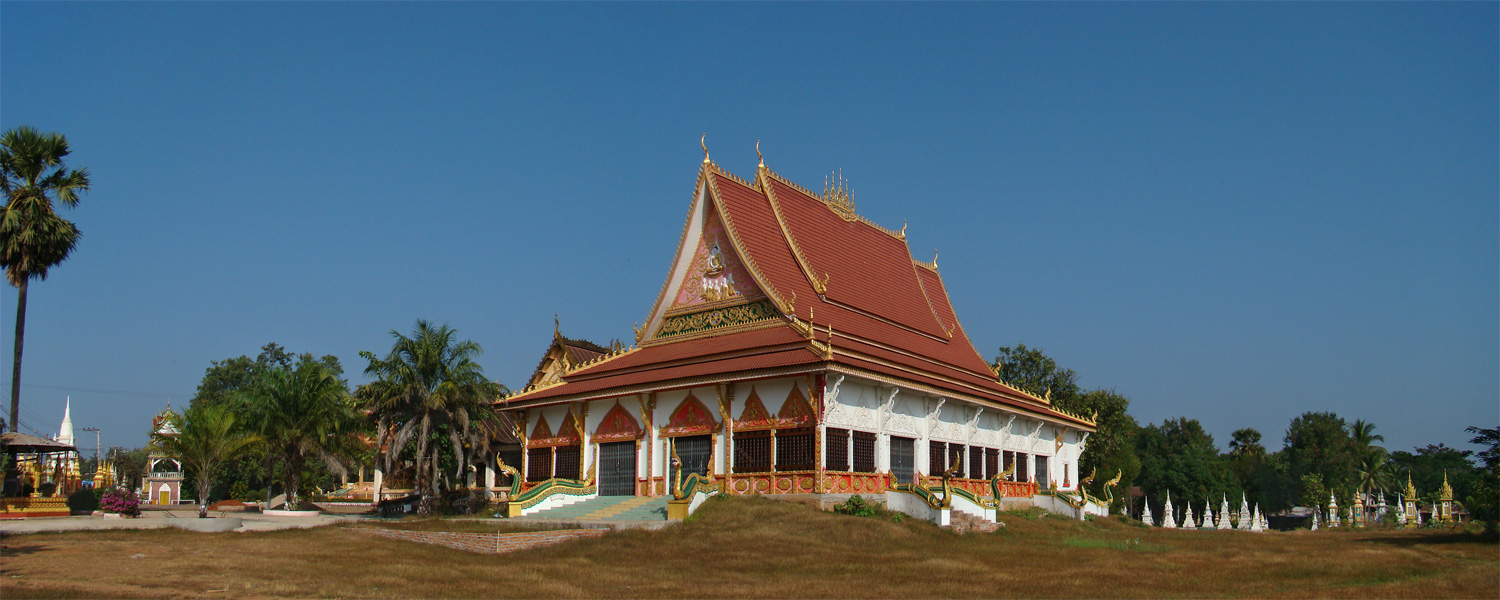
Wat Tham Fai in Pakse

== Culture ==
During the third lunar month (February), celebrations at Angkor precede Champasack's traditional Wat Phou Festival at the site of ruins. The festival is noted for elephant racing, cockfighting, and cultural performances of traditional Lao music and dance.
