= Champasak Provincial Museum =

Museum in Pakse, Laos

Coordinates: 15°07′06″N 105°48′43″E

The Champasak Provincial Museum (Lao: ຫໍພິພິທະພັນແຂວງຈຳປາສັກ) is a local museum in Pakse, Laos. It holds the unique history of the province, which gathers all kind of artifacts and documents to chronicle the history of Champasak. The museum also holds historical photos of cultural events, foreign meetings and pictures of Kaysone Phomvihane, Nouhak Phoumsavan and Khamtay Siphandone, all from the south. There are displays of musical instruments, stelae in the Tham script dating from the 15th to 18th centuries, a water jar from the 11th or 12th century and pottery from around the province and plus a model of Wat Phu. On the higher level, it displays different ethnic clothing, along with textile and jewellery collections.

== Literature ==
- Lenzi, Iola (2004). Museums of Southeast Asia. Singapore: Archipelago Press. p. 200. ISBN 981-4068-96-9.
