= Pierre Brocheux =

Vietnamese-French historian and editor (1931–2022)

- Born: 18 May 1931; Cholon, Cochinchina, French Indochina
- Died: 25 December 2022 (aged 91)
- Education: School for Advanced Studies in the Social Sciences
- Occupation: Historian

Pierre Brocheux (18 May 1931 – 25 December 2022) was a Vietnamese-French historian and editor. He specialized in the history of Vietnam and of French Indochina.

== Biography ==
Brocheux was born in Cholon (nowadays Ho Chi Minh City) in French Indochina on 18 May 1931 to a French father and a Vietnamese-French mother. He attended primary and secondary school in Saigon and Paris. A certified professor, he taught history and geography to secondary school students in Saigon from 1960 to 1968. He then taught the same subject at a secondary technical school in Vitry-sur-Seine from 1968 to 1970.

Brocheux earned a doctorate in history from the School for Advanced Studies in the Social Sciences in 1969. Afterwards, he worked as a lecturer at Paris Diderot University from 1970 to 1997. From 1989 to 2001, he was editor-in-chief of Revue de l'histoire des colonies françaises. In 1994, he co-founded the Association française des chercheurs sur l'Asie du Sud-Est, of which he served as president from 1994 to 1997.

Brocheux died on 25 December 2022, at the age of 91.

== Publications ==
- Histoire de l'Asie du Sud-Est : révoltes, réformes et révolutions (1981)
- Indochine, la colonisation ambiguë (1995)
- Hô Chi Minh (2000)
- Viet Nam Exposé.French Scholarship on Twentieth Century Vietnamese Society (2002)
- Hô Chi Minh, du révolutionnaire à l’icône (2003)
- Une histoire économique du Viet Nam : 1850-2007 : la palanche et le camion (2009)
- The Mekong Delta. Ecology, Economy and Revolution. 1860-1960 (2009)
- Histoire du Vietnam contemporain : la nation résiliente (2011)
- Les décolonisations au XXe siècle : la fin des empires européens et japonais (2012)
