= Mounlapamok district =

Mounlapamok district ເມືອງມູນລະປະໂມກ
- District
- Coordinates: 14°17′21″N 105°34′06″E
- Country: Laos
- Province: Champasak province

Population (2015)
  - Total: 38,774
- Time zone: UTC+7 (ICT)

Mounlapamok is a district (muang) of Champasak province in southwestern Laos. It is 500 km southeast of the capital, Vientiane, near the border with Thailand and Cambodia. It is near Khone Phapheng Falls of the Mekong River. Its population was 38,774 in 2015.

== Climate ==
The climate is moderate. The average temperature is 23 degrees Celsius. The warmest month, April, averages 26 degrees Celsius, and the coolest, August, 10 degrees Celsius. The average rainfall is 2,406 millimetres per year. The month with the most precipitation is September, at 541 mm, and the least is in February, at 1 mm.

Muang Mounlapamôk

Climate chart (precipitation, max. and min. temperature)
J	F	M	A	M	J	J	A	S	O	N	D
9 25 18	1 28 22	19 29 23	115 29 24	219 27 23	393 25 23	494 26 22	361 24 −3	541 24 22	159 25 20	55 25 20	40 24 19
- █ Average max. and min. temperatures in °C
- █ Precipitation totals in mm
Imperial conversion
J	F	M	A	M	J	J	A	S	O	N	D
0.4 77 64	0 82 72	0.7 84 73	4.5 84 75	8.6 81 73	15 77 73	19 79 72	14 75 27	21 75 72	6.3 77 68	2.2 77 68	1.6 75 66
- █ Average max. and min. temperatures in °F
- █ Precipitation totals in inches
