= Ong Keo =

Laotian military leader (died 1910)

- Died: November 1910; Salavan City, Kingdom of Champasak
- Monuments: Ong Keo Stupa
- Other names: Phu Mi Boun
- Occupation: Sorcerer
- Known for: Holy Man's Rebellion

Ong Keo (องค์แก้ว) was a leader of the Holy Man's Rebellion, a rebellion of Austroasiatic-speaking minorities (formerly called Mon-Khmer) in Thailand against French and Lao forces, where it was a widespread but short-lived cause. He surrendered to the French in October 1907; however, he continued the struggle until his murder in 1910. After his death, fighting continued under his successor Ong Kommandam until at least 1937. Local legend holds that Ong Keo survived the murder attempt and lived until the early 1970s.

== Early life ==
Ong Keo was an ethnic Alak, born in Ban Paktai, Muang Thateng, in what then was part of the kingdom of Champasak, but now is in Xekong or Sekong Province.

His father was a village chief. Ong Keo moved rapidly up the leadership ladder because of his charisma and intelligence, and his fluency in Lao and Pali. He performed religious ceremonies on Mount Tayun, which was close to his home village. He advocated that foreigners be thrown out. His following grew quickly and soon they began calling him Pha Ong Keo (พระองค์แก้ว − Wiktionary: prá ong gâew) − "Venerable Precious-Jewel," and a Phu Mi Boun (Thai: ผู้มีบุญ, lit. "person have Buddhist merit"), usually translated in the messianic sense as The Holy Man.

== Rebellion ==
He launched his rebellion in Thateng in response to the destruction of the temple of Ban Nong Mek. This rebellion lasted six years before a truce could be made. Ong Keo surrendered to the French in October 1907 after military defeats, epidemics and famine disheartened his troops. Despite his surrender, he never submitted to the conditions the French laid on him. He continued to use the title of "Great King" that he had given himself, performed Buddhist/Alak religious rites and encouraged his disciples, particularly Ong Kommandam, to carry on his struggle. In 1910, the French Commissioner of Saravane, Jean-Jacques Dauplay, ordered that he be killed for his "arrogant" attitude. Some sources say that Dauplay himself killed Ong Keo after summoning him to a meeting, with a gun he had hid in his hat.

== See also ==
- The Art of Not Being Governed: An Anarchist History of Upland Southeast Asia (2009)
- Zomia (geography), a term used in the book
