= Bolaven Plateau =

Elevated region in southern Laos

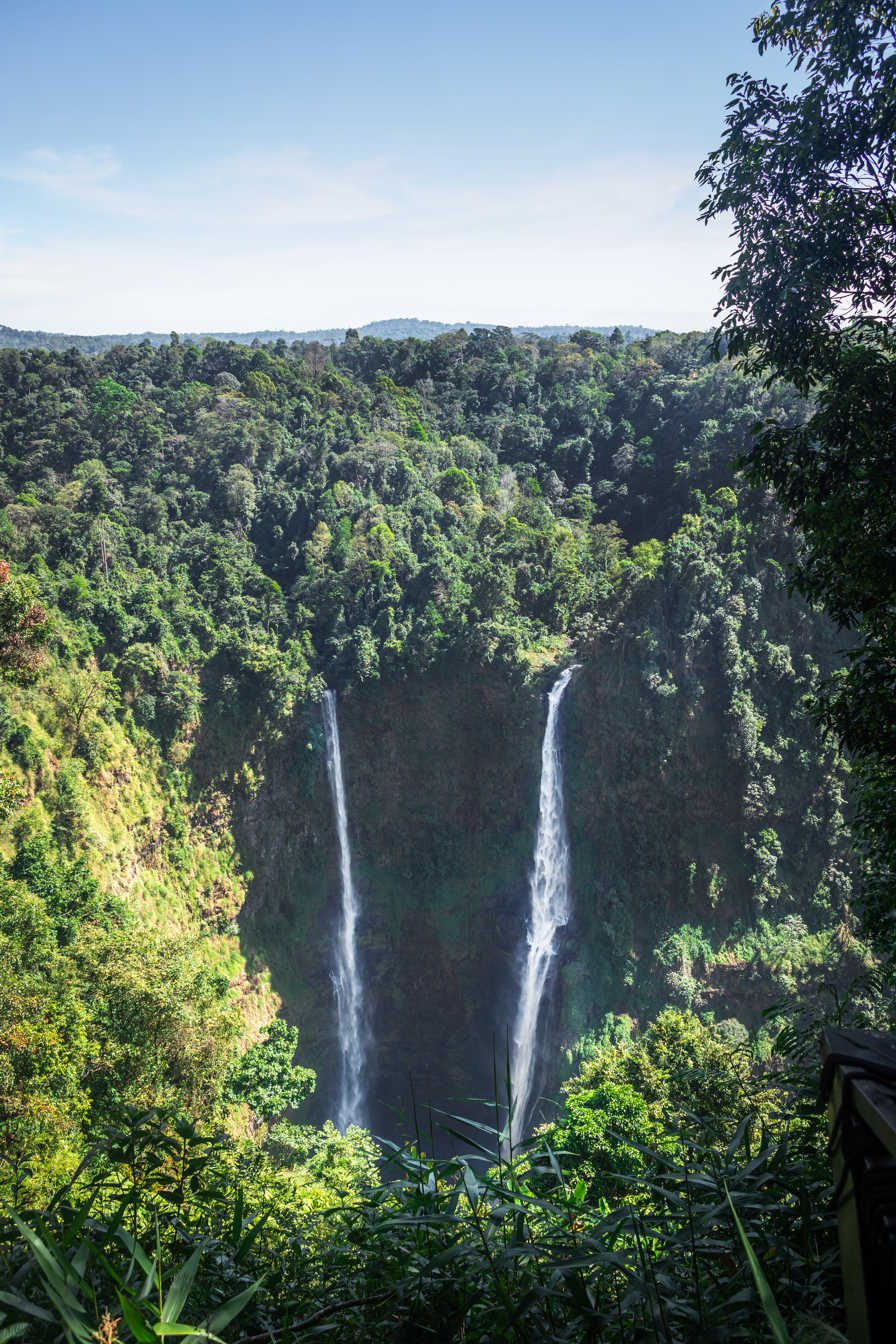
Tad Fane waterfall in December 2025, situated in the Bolaven Plateau. The water drops about 120 m.

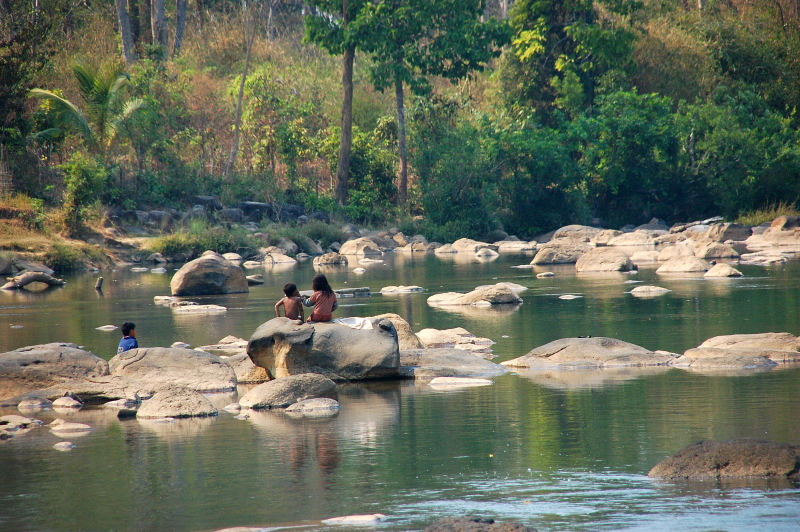
Tad Lo, Bolaven Plateau, Laos

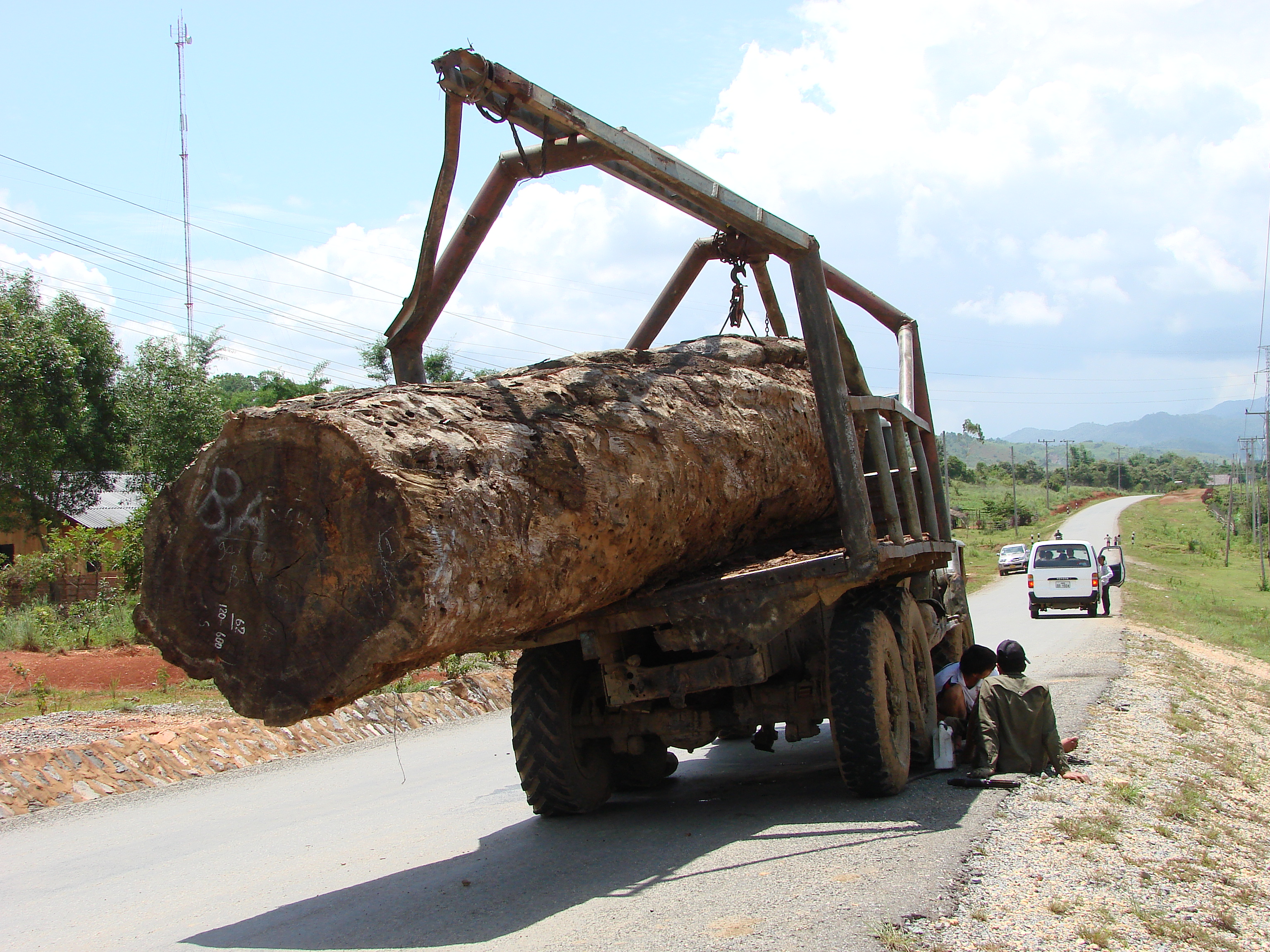
Logging truck on the Bolaven Plateau, southern Laos. June 2009

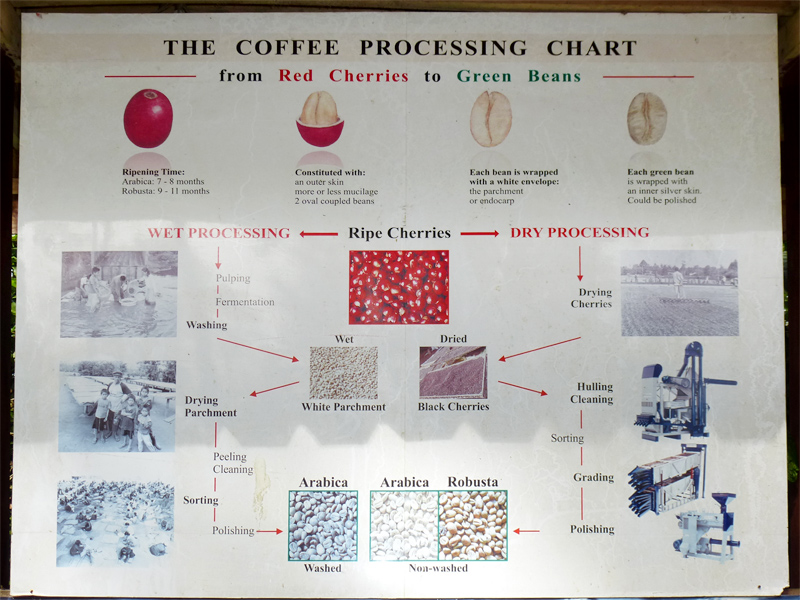
Coffee processing on the Bolaven Plateau

The Bolaven Plateau is an elevated region in southern Laos. Most of the plateau is located within Champasak Province of Laos, though the edges of the plateau are also located in Salavan, Sekong and Attapeu Provinces. It is located between the Annamite Range, along which runs Laos' eastern border with Vietnam, and the Mekong River to the west, at about 15°N 106°E. The plateau's elevation ranges approximately from 1,000 to 1,350 metres (3,280 to 4,430 ft) above sea level. The plateau is crossed by several rivers and has many scenic waterfalls. The name Bolaven makes reference to the Laven ethnic group which has historically dominated the region. However, domestic migrations by the Lao ethnic group (which comprises approximately 50 to 60 percent of the population of Laos) has resulted in widespread interethnic marriage, thus modifying the ethnic composition of the region.

== Historical significance ==
The Bolaven Plateau has had an important role in the greater history of Laos. The three most significant historical periods which have greatly affected the area are the French colonization of the region, the Phu Mi Bun Revolt, and the Vietnam War. Each event has had a significant effect upon the Plateau and given the area its own unique character and importance.

=== French colonization ===
In 1893, the French first annexed territories east of the Mekong River and later annexed minor extensions of land to the west of the Mekong in 1904 and 1907. For the Bolaven Plateau, the period of French colonization in Laos is most significant because of the agricultural techniques acquired from the French by the inhabitants. According to the Historical Dictionary, "the French planted coffee and experimented with rubber, and the plateau has remained an important agricultural area growing a wide variety of fruit and vegetables, as well as cash crops". It was not until the French introduced farming to the region in the early 20th century that the residents of the Bolaven Plateau made the area an agricultural sector.

The second period that helps define the history of the Plateau is the Phu Mi Bun Revolt. The revolt erupted in 1901 and was not suppressed until 1907. It was a “major rebellion by local Lao Theung tribes (the Alak, Nyaheun and Laven) against French domination". Though there is not extensive literature on these particular revolutionary revolts in the Bolaven Plateau, one can see that the native communities desired to rid the region of the extensive and overpowering influence of their colonizers.

=== The Vietnam War ===
The Bolaven Plateau suffered greatly during the Vietnam War because it was one of the most heavily-bombed theatres of the war especially in the late ’60s. Controlling the Plateau was considered strategically vital to both the Americans and the North Vietnamese, as evidenced by the staggering amount of unexploded ordnance still lying around. As a result of this, it is often dangerous to veer off unmarked paths. According to many accounts, the devastation caused by these bombings can still be seen in some areas, though most edifices have been rebuilt. In addition, the fact that the Ho Chi Minh Trail passed the eastern edge of the Plateau still attracts tourists and brings further attention to the region. During the war the plateau was accessible by vehicle only via Paksong and Thateng.

== Culture ==
The predominant ethnic group in the Bolaven Plateau is the Laven, though other Mon-Khmer ethnic groups reside in the area including the Alak, Katu, Taoy, and Suay. According to CPA Media, "all of these people follow animist belief systems" with some groups practicing animal sacrifices. However, more recently, some of these minority communities have begun to adopt Buddhist beliefs because of their contact with Lao Loum.

== Economy ==
Literature on the Bolaven Plateau often focuses on two primary economic contributors to the region: agricultural production and tourism. Both contribute greatly to the plateau’s revenue.

The French first began farming and other agricultural techniques in the Bolaven Plateau including the production of coffee, rubber, and bananas in the early 20th century. Since the French's initial influence, "the plateau remained an important agricultural area growing a wide variety of fruit and vegetables, as well as cash crops such as cardamom". However, it was the French introduction of the production of coffee that has proved most useful to the region.

During colonization, the French introduced the production of “high quality stock of both Arabica and Robusta strains. Production declined during the war years, but is now experiencing a renaissance”. The climate of the Plateau with its cooler temperatures and abundant rainfall makes it the perfect place for coffee production. Most farming families that make up a variety of the aforementioned minority groups are highly dependent on the coffee industry as their source of income. Coffee in Laos is "cultivated almost exclusively on the Bolaven Plateau in Champasak Province in the southern part of the country... Currently, the Lao coffee harvest generates about 15–20,000 tons a year, 80% of which is Robusta."

== Tourism ==
Tourism has taken a hold in the Bolaven Plateau because of the unique aspects of the region that have triggered great intrigue. The most popular places visited by tourists are the waterfalls in the region, the villages of the ethnic minorities, and other geographical and cultural areas of interest.

The Bolaven Plateau has a number of waterfalls. Tad Lo is a common destination in the northeastern part of the plateau. The locally maintained Visit Tad Lo website provides practical information on waterfalls, village walks, guided treks, workshops and other activities in Tad Lo.

In addition, beyond Paksong on the way to Pakse, Tad Fan is another major waterfall on the plateau.

Tourist attractions also include the villages of ethnic minorities who have grown accustomed to sharing their culture with visitors to the region. Travel guides inform visitors of nearby villages that can be visited: "Alak, Katu and Suay villages can be found within a few kilometres of the resort". Tourists are also informed of the markets where they can go and observe the cultures of ethnic minorities and purchase items unique to each culture.

The Bolaven Plateau is filled with cultural and geographical areas of interest. Whether it is a boat trip to one of the waterfalls that occupy the region, a tour of the area's coffee plantations, an elephant day trek, or visiting one of the villages of the ethnic minorities, a journey to the Plateau has many opportunities for tourists.

== Impact crater ==
Researchers believe that a meteorite, about 2 kilometres (1.2 mi) wide, struck Earth approximately 790,000 years ago, with its impact crater perhaps buried under Bolaven Plateau volcanic field, as its strewn tektites, known as the Australasian strewnfield are found across Asia, Australia, and Antarctica.
