= Vat Phou =

UNESCO World Heritage Site in Champasak, Laos

Vat Phou and Associated Settlements within the Champasak Cultural Landscape
UNESCO World Heritage Site
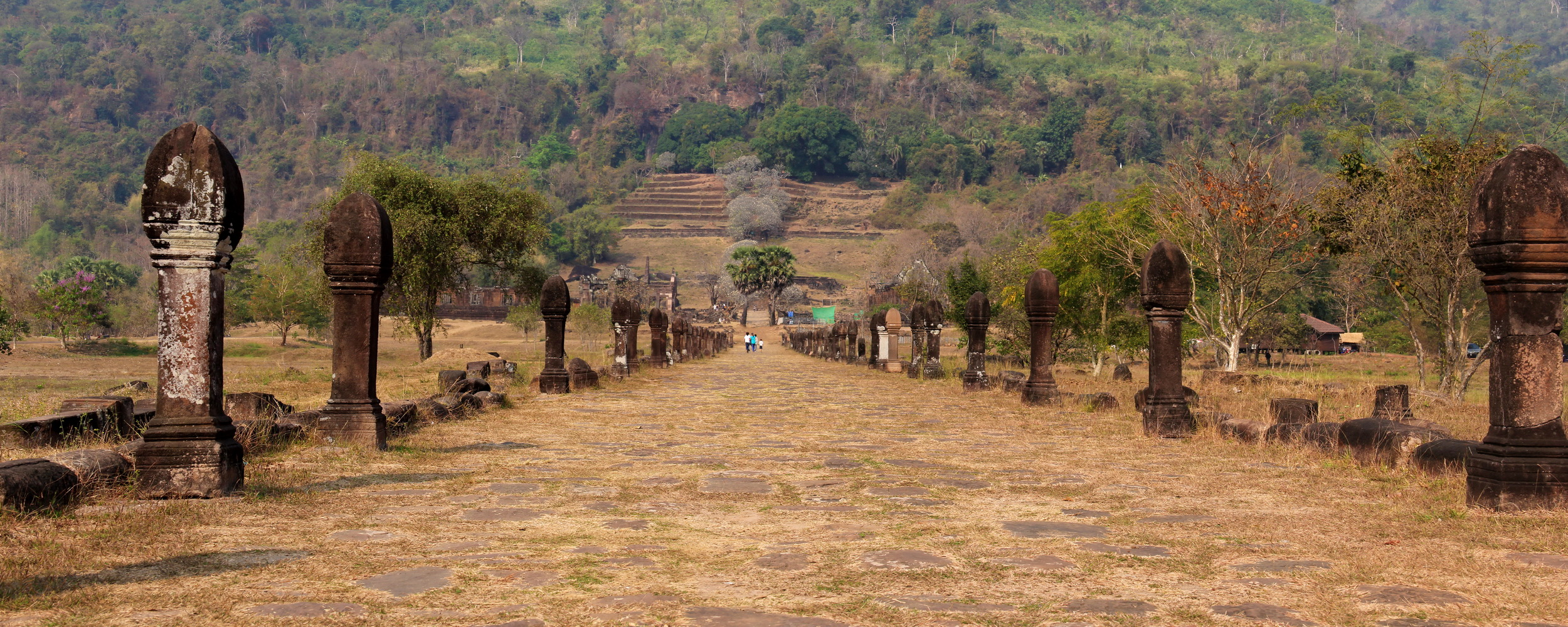
- Causeway, looking towards the sanctuary

- Location within Laos
- Location: Champasak Province, Laos
- Criteria: Cultural: (iii)(iv)(vi)
- Reference: 481
- Inscription: 2001 (25th Session)
- Area: 39,000 ha (96,000 acres)
- Coordinates: 14°50′54″N 105°49′20″E

Vat Phou is a ruined Khmer-Hindu temple complex in southern Laos. There was a sanctuary on the site, centred on a spring and an offering place for a tutelary spirit dating back to pre-historic times. The first megalithic stone structures had been built probably as early as the second century BCE, consisting of two stone cells, a carving of a crocodile, serpent stairs, and offering platforms. One of the pre-Angkor brick buildings onsite was erected in the 7th century and became the focus of consequent building activities.

== History ==
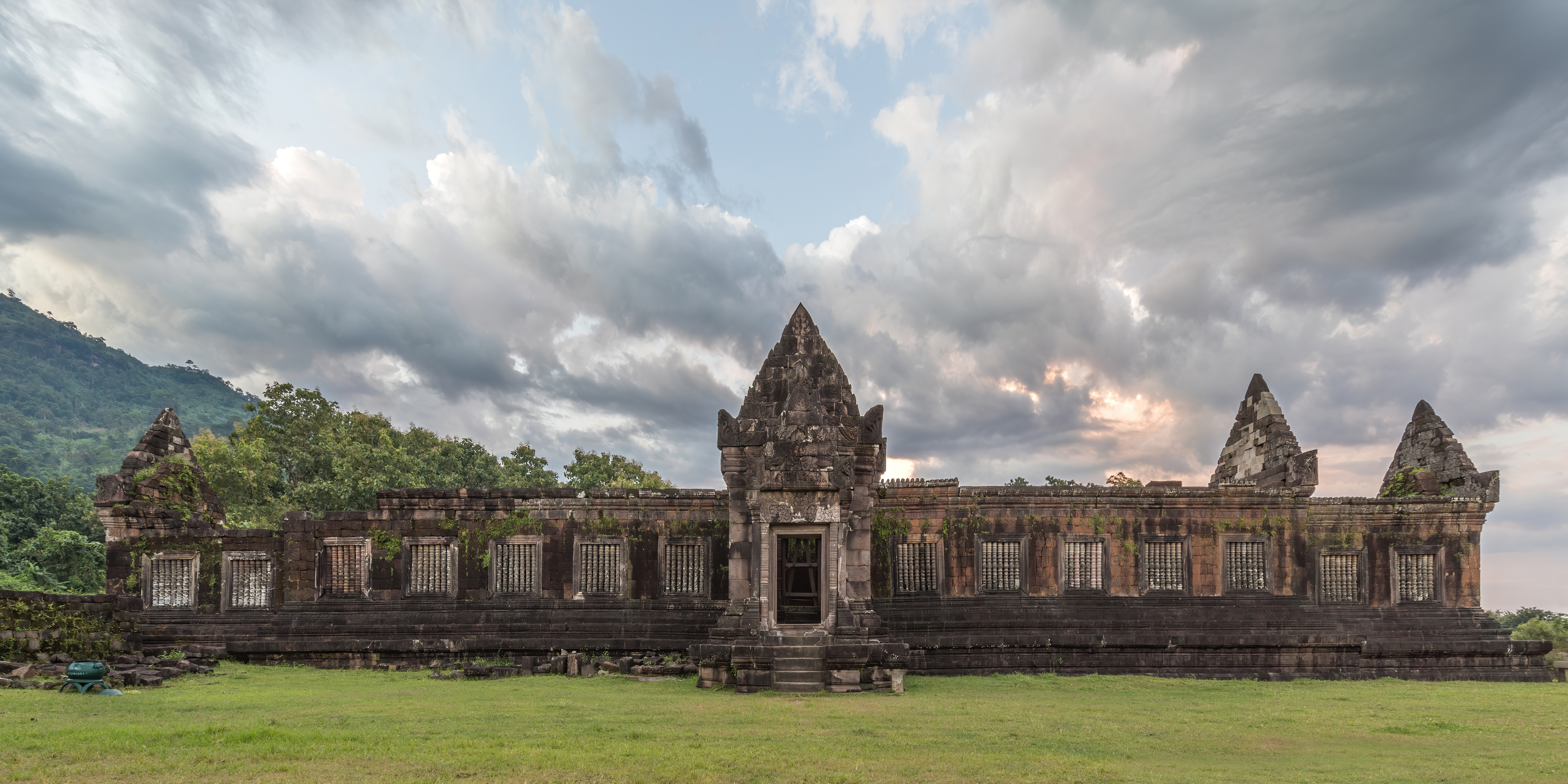
Northern palace in the Wat Phou complex.

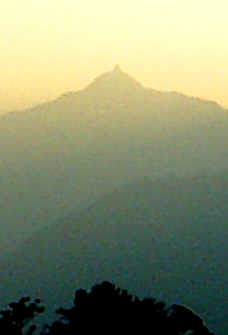
Phou Khao has a natural lingam on its peak.

Vat Phou was initially associated with the city of Shrestapura, which lay on the bank of the Mekong directly east of Lingaparvata Mountain (later called Phou Khao). The site stands on the right bank of the river, not far from the mouth of the Mun. By the latter part of the fifth century, the city was the capital of a kingdom that texts and inscriptions connect with the Chenla Kingdom and Champa. The first structure on the mountain was constructed around this time. The mountain gained spiritual importance from the lingam-shaped protuberance on its summit. The mountain itself was, therefore, considered the home of Shiva, and the river as representing the ocean or the Ganges. The earliest known inscription found at the site, the Văt Luong Kău Inscription (K.365), mentions the name of Devanika, who established a sacred tīrtha in the area. It records that he had won innumerable victories and came from afar to found a kingdom, and that he offered thousands of cattle to a temple foundation. Standing Buddhas in Gupta and post-Gupta style are among the pieces held in the site museum. Pierre-Yves Manguin, who describes them as unpublished, groups them with comparable statues from Thailand and from Cham sites in central Vietnam as evidence of an artistic vocabulary shared across the region between the 5th and the late 7th or early 8th century.

A festival is held on the site each February. Boundary posts along the path were restored. Vat Phou was designated a World Heritage Site in 2001.

== Conservation projects ==
After the first scientific description on the 19th and 20th century there was less scientific activity at the site until the 1990s. With the Lao-UNESCO projects starting in 1987 and the designation as UNESCO World Heritage Site in 2001 archeologic and conservation activities increased. Examples of conservation projects are:

- Global Heritage Fund, in association with the Lerici Institute (Italy) and the government of Laos, is providing emergency conservation of temple structures at this largest of archaeological sites in Laos. The stabilization and sustained conservation of Nandin Hall is the primary focus of these efforts. The Global Heritage Fund-led team is working with local communities for training and development.
- 2005-2012: French-Lao cooperation project (French Ministry of Foreign and European Affairs / Lao Ministry of Information and Culture): Priority Solidarity Funds "Vat Phou-Champasak, enhancement and development of the historical and cultural heritage" (FSP 2005-75). This project included restoration of the northern hall of the southern quadrangle (palace), cultural project on the intangible heritage of Champasak: Rediscovery of the Champasak Shadow Puppet Theatre and organization of a theatre tour in the villages of the district of Champasak accompanied by Cinema Tuk-tuk, Layout of the 'Sala' and surroundings of Vat Phou site. Objectives of the project were: institutional support for the creation of a body specialized management of the site, training of the scientific, technical and administrative staff, and development of the site and its economic valuation.
- 2006: Restoration project for the temple of Nandin by the Italian mission
- 2009: Restoration project for the northern palace by the Archaeological Survey of India (ASI). The Indian Team from Archaeological survey of India, headed by R. S. Jamwal, conducted studies of foundations, drainage problems, super structural elements and did the documentation, recording, survey work etc. for the Northern Quadrangle of temple complex.
- 2010: Restoration project for the southern palace, with Jean-Marc Houlteau, stonemason.
- 2011: Restoration project for the southern quadrangle (palace), with Jean-Marc Simon-Bernardini and Johann Gautreau, stonemasons.
- 2014: Non-intrusive stone analyses, by Christian Fischer.

== Presentation and visits ==
Vat Phou is open to the public for religious activities and tourist visits. The site features a museum which houses artifacts of the temple complex of centuries, such as statues of Shiva, Vishnu and Nandin, and Buddhist statues. The museum building has been limited to a specific size to minimize altering the underground site and the view.

== Notes ==
1. Projet de Recherches en Archaeologie Lao. Vat Phu: The Ancient City, The Sanctuary, The Spring (pamphlet).
2. Freeman, A Guide to Khmer Temples in Thailand and Laos p. 200-201.
3. ICOMOS report p. 71.
4. ICOMOS report p. 72.
5. Global Heritage Fund - Where We Work - Wat Phu, Laos Accessed on 2009-04-28.
6. Global Heritage Fund - Where We Work - Wat Phu, Laos Accessed on 2009-04-28.
