= Alak people =

Alak
Total population
- 25,430 (2015 est.)

Regions with significant populations
- Laos

Languages
- Alak

Religion
- Animism

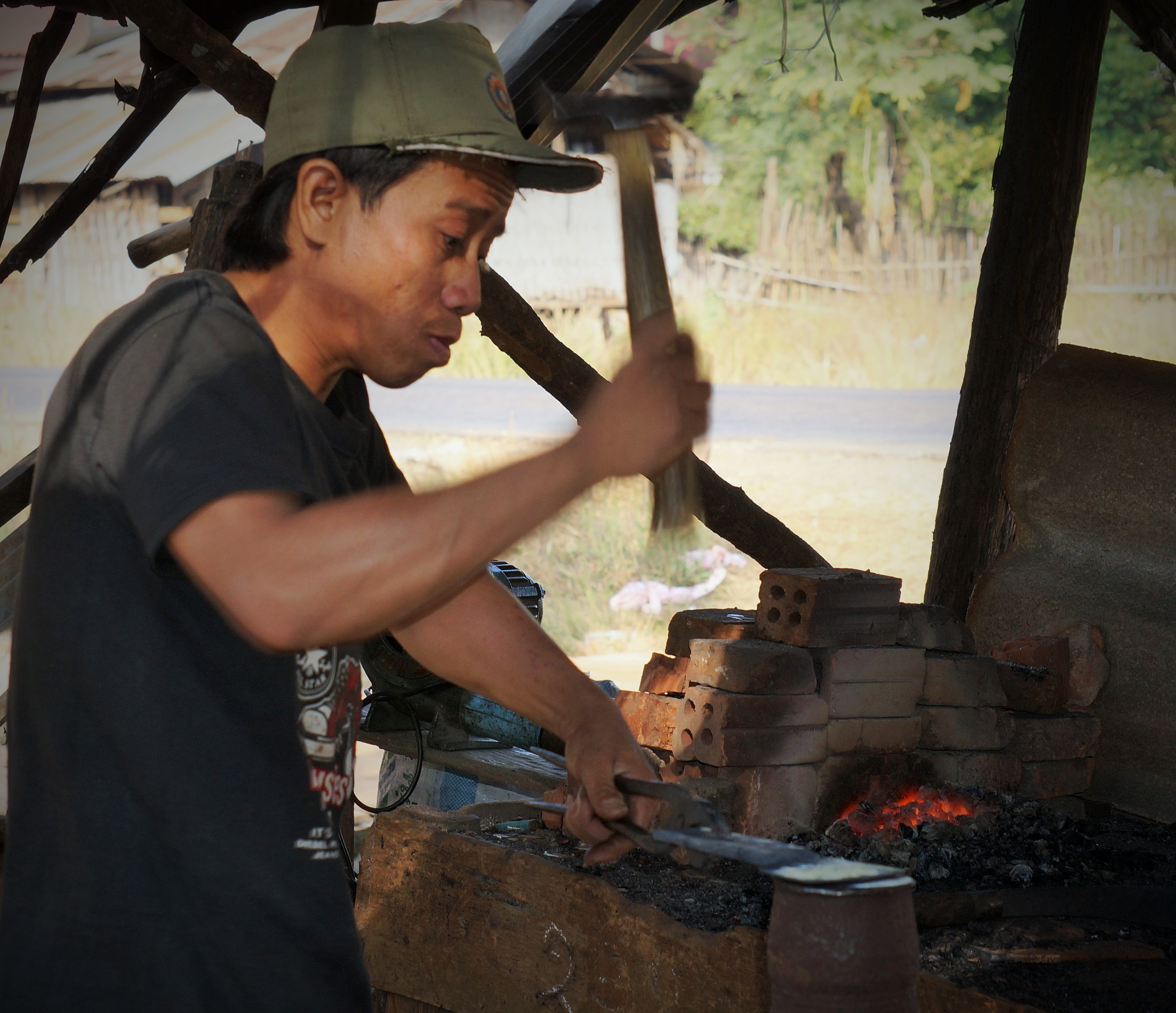
The Alak blacksmiths of the village of Houayhe, Laos, Plateau des Bolovens

The Alak or Hrlak are an Austroasiatic ethnic group of southern Laos, living mainly in Salavan Province. They speak the Alak language. a lot is known of their history, though as an Austroasiatic-speaking group, their origin is presumably in the Central Highlands of Vietnam.

== Culture ==
Nowadays, most Alak live in scattered villages of between ten and sixty houses, traditionally built in a circular pattern around a communal house. Houses are normally built on stilts about a metre high. The main diet and trading staple is rice, farmed with the slash-and-burn method, although small game, fish, and various plants and mushrooms provide additional food.

Religious beliefs involve a range of supernatural beings, including spirits of mountains, forests and other natural features. Most villages have a shaman who helps cure the sick and predict the future for the village. The dead are typically buried in graveyards in the forest.

== Notable members ==
- Ong Keo
- Ong Kommandam

== See also ==
- The Art of Not Being Governed
