= Paksong =

City in Paksong District, Laos

Coordinates: 15°10′47″N 106°14′16″E

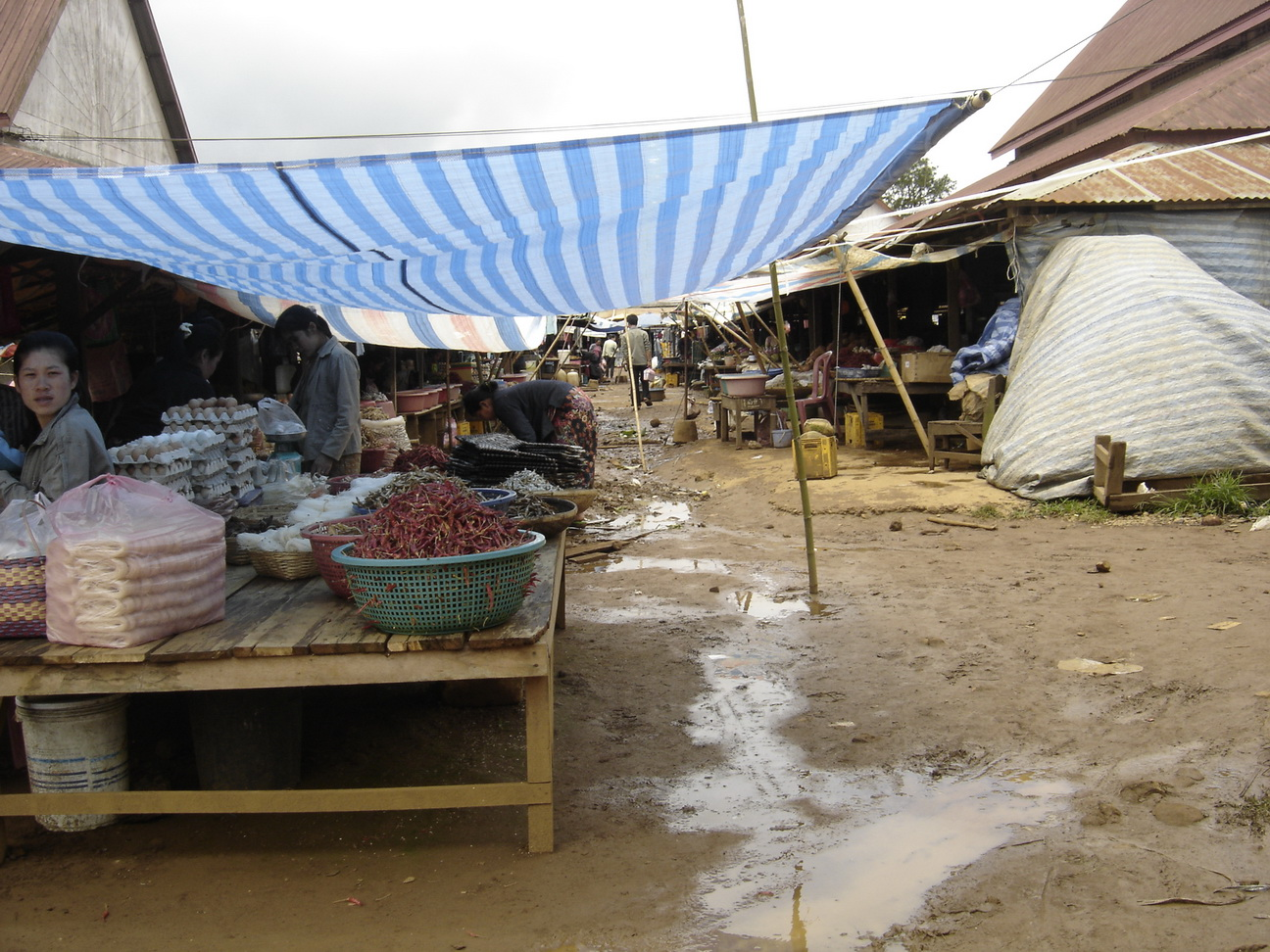
Paksong street market

Paksong is a city in Laos on the Bolaven Plateau. The city is known for its coffee exports. It is the capital of Paksong District.
