= Cambodian irredentism =

Irredentist movement in Cambodia

Cambodian irredentism is a nationalist movement in Cambodia that refers to the land that used to be part of the Khmer Empire. The movement is aimed against Thai, Vietnamese, and Laotian control over the territories. Both official and unofficial Cambodian claims on territories viewed as having been under some form of Cambodian sovereignty are rhetorically tied back to accused expansionism.

== History ==
Up until the establishment of the Thai and Laotian states, the Khmer Empire was the major land power and a dominant force in mainland Southeast Asia. The territory of Cambodia encompassed most of what would be now Thailand, Laos, part of Myanmar and Southern Vietnam; in an extent, it encroached to even mainland Malaysia. However, subsequent problems and turmoils, as well as the rapid advance by the Vietnamese, Laotians and Thais brought Cambodia's empire into a declining state. Among all, the Thais and the Vietnamese were seen to have done the most harm to Cambodia, causing significant physical traumas for the people of the nation. In order to survive, Cambodia came under a French protectorate, only to find itself being grouped within Vietnamese-dominated French Indochina, and with the French favoring Vietnamese instead of Cambodians. At the outbreak of the First Indochina War Khmer irredentism began to rise. Nonetheless, it was not officially espoused until 1970 when Lon Nol overthrew the monarchy and replaced it with a Republic, where it became increasingly nationalistic and chauvinist, leading to the persecution and massacres of the ethnic Vietnamese and Chams. The Khmer Rouge later inherited these nationalistic sentiments which were part of the driving force for the persecution and massacres of Vietnamese in Cambodia as a part of the Cambodian genocide, and which was one of the motivations for Khmer Rouge incursions in Vietnam and occupations of Vietnamese territories which resulted in several massacres of Vietnamese civilians, the most notorious of which was the Ba Chúc massacre.

== Modern irredentism ==
=== Mekong Delta ===
The Cambodians hold a significant amount of hostility to Vietnam with regard to their loss of the Mekong Delta to the Vietnamese in history, and the subsequent enforced Vietnamization and conflicts which Vietnam repeatedly occupied the country, accused French favoritism to the Vietnamese, and the lack of cultural commonalities with Vietnam being part of the Sinosphere while Cambodia belongs to the Indosphere. This often drew Cambodian nationalist sentiments with the desire to reclaim territory from Vietnam. Both Lon Nol and Pol Pot utilized this grievance in order to spread Cambodian irredentism.

Currently, Cambodian irredentists still feel strongly attached to the region, and as a result, they believe it is a lost territory which should be returned to Cambodia. The expression of this sentiment has frequently ignited various protests, notably the 2013–2014 Cambodian protests, and Vietnam is frequently blamed for all of the turmoil and problems which occur within Cambodia, partly because Hun Sen is closely affiliated with Vietnam. This sentiment has sometimes driven Cambodia to forge close ties with China, a country which Vietnam has a strong feeling of enmity towards because it was ruled by China for over one thousand years.

In addition to the Mekong Delta, Cambodian nationalists seek to reclaim Phú Quốc, which Cambodians frequently call "Koh Trol", based on their belief that it was part of Cambodian territory before it was annexed by Vietnam, and it often attracts a number of Cambodian celebrities. There is largely no evidence proving if there was any Khmer entities and government being able to exercise effective sovereignty and control over the Vietnamese island, with French reports indicated no Khmer settlement on the island as of 1770s.

=== Thailand ===
While tensions with Thailand are now receiving lesser attention, many Cambodians nonetheless have a long-standing hostility in regard to Thailand, because most of Thailand used to be under Khmer control until the rise of the Sukhothai Kingdom, and subsequent conflicts which started the demise of Cambodia as a regional power and repeated Thai occupations of Cambodia. Therefore, a strong anti-Thai sentiment developed in Cambodia fueled by a persistent historical misconception among educated Thais and the ruling class that distinguishes a so-called Khom ethnic group and Khmer as separate peoples—a distinct Thai narrative known only to Thais—perpetuated to mask the significant historical influence of the Khmer on Thai culture, thereby resulting in a form of historical negationism.

Cambodia and Thailand also engaged in border disputes from 2008 to 2011 with regard to Preah Vihear. Eventually, Cambodia acquired the temple following the dispute. There is also irredentism against Thailand with regard to Northern Khmer people, where Cambodians still see them part of Cambodian nation, and that lower part of northeastern Thailand should have been Cambodian.

=== Laos ===
Cambodian irredentism in Laos mainly focuses on the provinces of Champasak and Attapeu in Southern Laos. The unclear border delimitation between the two countries led to some sporadic tensions from 2017 to 2019. In 2019, Cambodia and Laos removed troops from the disputes area surrounding Stung Treng.

== See also ==
- Anti-Khmer sentiment
