= Bù Đốp Masscare =

Mass killing in Vietnam

Coordinates: 10°30′N 104°54′E

- Part of the Cambodian genocide
- Location: Bù Đốp, Binh Phuoc, Vietnam
- Date: March 16, 1978
- Target: Vietnamese civilians
- Attack type: Mass killing, massacre, ethnic cleansing, torture
- Deaths: 247 civilians
- Perpetrator: Revolutionary Army of Kampuchea (Khmer Rouge)
- Motive: Anti-Vietnamese sentiment, Ethnic cleansing, Khmer ultranationalism

The Bù Đốp Masscare (Vietnamese: Thảm sát Bù Đốp) was the mass killing of 247 vietnamese civilians committed by the Kampuchea Revolutionary Army (Khmer Rouge) on March 16, 1978, in Hung Phuoc, Thien Hung communes, Loc Ninh district, Binh Phuoc province, It was a spillover of the Cambodian genocide which also targeted Vietnamese people mainly in Cambodia. hundreds of people arrested or displaced, houses burned, and food and property looted.

== Background ==
From 1977 onwards, the Khmer Rouge intensified their border incursions and armed provocations. Particularly in the Hoa Lu border gate area, about 30 km as the crow flies from Phuoc Thien commune, fighting occurred daily: On the night of January 28, 1978, Khmer Rouge troops attacked the border outpost; on February 1, 1978, Khmer Rouge soldiers ambushed and killed a commanding officer of the 205th Regiment, 302nd Division; on the night of February 27 and the early morning of February 28, 1978, the entire main Khmer Rouge regiment launched a massive attack on the Hoa Lu border outpost, resulting in the deaths of 34 officers and soldiers and 13 wounded.

== See also ==
- Ba Chúc massacre
- Bibliography of the Cambodian genocide
