= Cambodian–Vietnamese War =

1978–89 conflict between Vietnam and the Khmer Rouge

- Part of the Third Indochina War, the Cold War in Asia, and the Sino-Soviet split
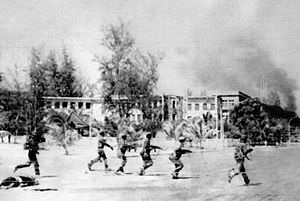
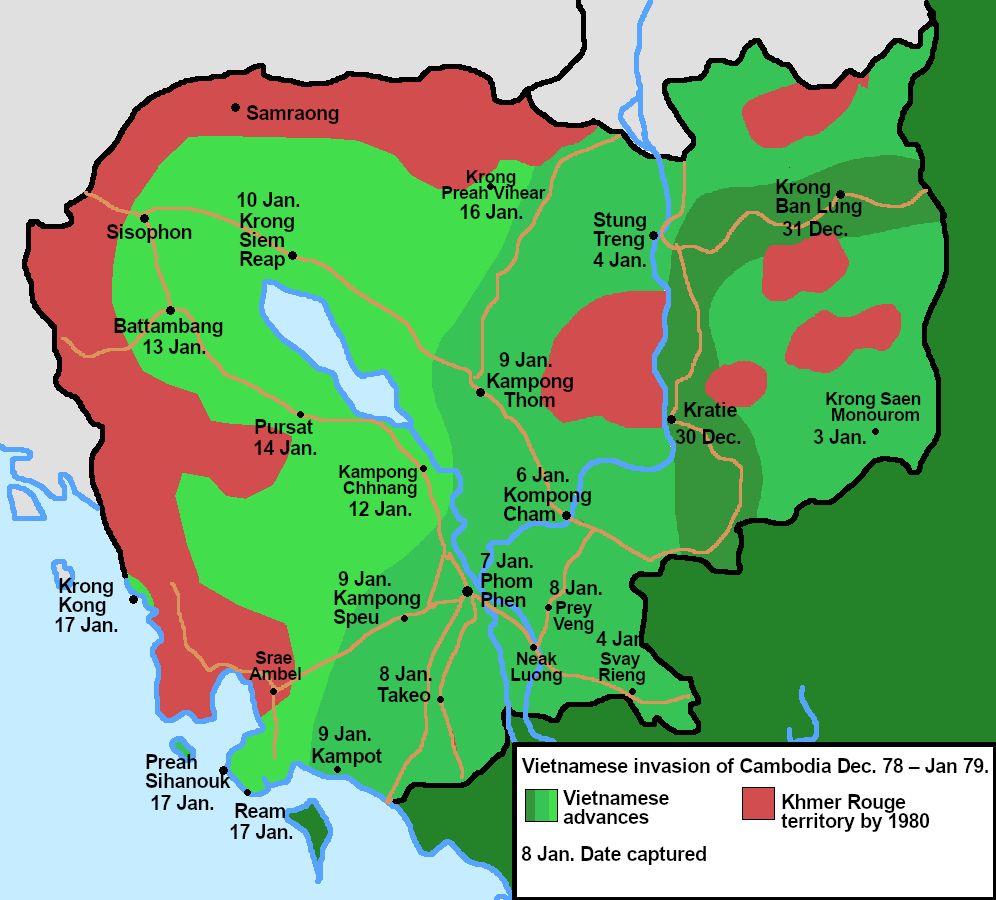
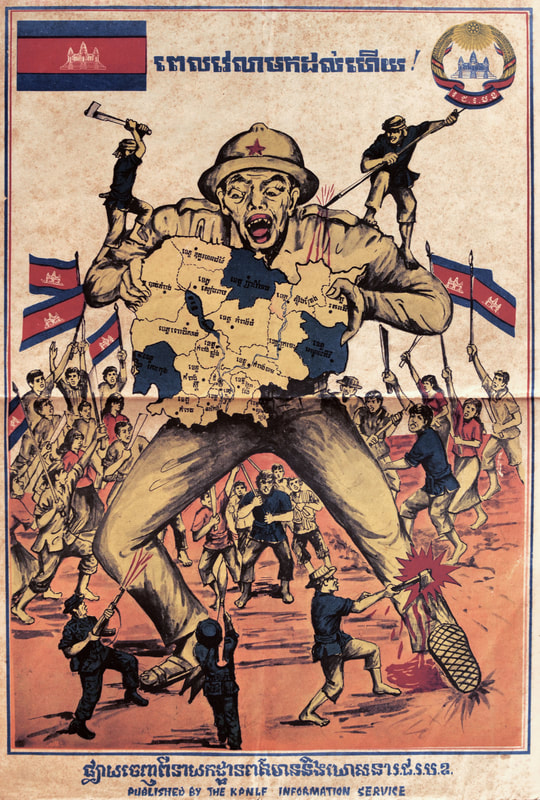
- From top to bottom, left to right: Vietnamese forces entering Phnom Penh in January 1979; Map of the Vietnamese advances in 1979; Map of Indochina 1979 to 1989; Anti-Vietnamese propaganda from the Khmer People's National Liberation Front
Date	23 December 1978 – 26 September 1989 (10 years, 9 months and 3 days) (Note: The conflict between Vietnam and Kampuchea already started in late 1977.)
Location	Cambodia, eastern border of Thailand
Result	1991 Paris Peace Accords: Vietnam's overthrow of Democratic Kampuchea in early 1979; End of the Cambodian genocide; Establishment, then dissolution, of the People's Republic of Kampuchea; Vietnamese occupation in Cambodia; Chinese invasion of Vietnam and continued border skirmishes; Start of the Cambodian conflict (1979–1998); Establishment of the Coalition Government of Democratic Kampuchea in 1982; Vietnamese withdrawal from Cambodia in September 1989; UN-led transition in Cambodia; End of communist regime in Cambodia in 1992; Restoration of multi-party rule and a constitutional monarchy in Cambodia in 1993; Ongoing democratic backsliding after the 1997 Cambodian coup d'état

Belligerents
Democratic Kampuchea (1978–1982); Khmer Rouge; Thailand	Socialist Republic of Vietnam; Liberated Area of Cambodia; (People's Republic of Kampuchea) FUNSK
Post-invasion: Coalition Government of Democratic Kampuchea (1982–1989); Khmer Rouge; KPNLF; FUNCINPEC; MOULINAKA; Sihanouk National Army; Thailand	Post-invasion: Until April 1989: Socialist Republic of Vietnam; People's Republic of Kampuchea From April 1989: State of Cambodia

Commanders and leaders
Pol Pot; Khieu Samphan; Ieng Sary; Nuon Chea; Ta Mok; See full list: Son Sann; Dien Del; Norodom Sihanouk; Norodom Ranariddh; In Tam; Nhek Bun Chhay	Lê Duẩn; Trường Chinh; Nguyễn Văn Linh; Võ Nguyên Giáp; Văn Tiến Dũng; See full list: Lê Đức Anh; Lê Trọng Tấn; Đoàn Khuê; Võ Chí Công; Heng Samrin; Hun Sen; Pen Sovan; Chea Sim

Strength
1979: 73,000; 1989: 30,000 (Note: By 1989, the Khmer Rouge maintained the largest fighting force amongst the three factions which made up the Coalition Government of Democratic Kampuchea. The KPNLF had less than 10,000 men, and FUNCINPEC had 2,000 fighters.)	150,000–200,000 Vietnamese soldiers (Note: From an invasion force of 150,000, Vietnamese troop strength was estimated to have peaked at around 200,000 until Vietnam began their unilateral withdrawal in 1982.); 1,000 Lao soldiers (1988)

Casualties and losses
100,000+ killed; 422 killed	15,000–25,300 killed; 30,000 wounded; Unknown
- 200,000 Cambodian civilians and soldiers killed

The Cambodian–Vietnamese War (Note: (Khmer: សង្គ្រាមកម្ពុជា-វៀតណាមSângkréam Kâmpŭchéa-Viĕtnam; Vietnamese: Chiến tranh Campuchia–Việt Nam), known in Vietnam as the Southwestern Border Counter-Offensive (Vietnamese: Chiến dịch Phản công Biên giới Tây-Nam), and by Cambodian nationalists as the Vietnamese invasion of Cambodia (Khmer: ការឈ្លានពានរបស់វៀតណាមមកកម្ពុជា, UNGEGN: Karchhléanpéan rôbâs Viĕtnam môk Kâmpŭchéa)) was an armed conflict from 1978 to 1989 between Democratic Kampuchea and the Socialist Republic of Vietnam, and their respective allies. It began in December 1978, with smaller clashes culminating into a Vietnamese invasion of Cambodia which toppled the Khmer Rouge regime and ended in 1989 with the withdrawal of Vietnamese forces from Cambodia. This Cold War conflict was part of the Third Indochina War and Sino-Soviet split with the Soviet Union supporting Vietnam and China supporting Kampuchea.

Despite both being communist, the alliance between the Communist Party of Vietnam and the Khmer Rouge broke down after both defeated Vietnamese and Cambodian anti-communist regimes respectively in the Second Indochina War. As a result, the war was preceded by years of conflict between Vietnam and the Khmer Rouge, led by Pol Pot, when the Khmer Rouge-ruled Democratic Kampuchea repeatedly invaded Vietnam, including massacres by the Khmer Rouge, notably the Ba Chúc massacre of over 3,000 Vietnamese civilians in April 1978. On 21 December 1978, the Vietnamese launched a limited offensive towards the town of Kratie. On 23 December 1978, 10 out of 19 divisions of the Khmer Rouge's Kampuchea Revolutionary Army opened fire along the border with Vietnam with the goal of invading the southwestern border provinces of Đồng Tháp, An Giang and Kiên Giang. On 25 December 1978, Vietnam supported Cambodian dissidents in exile and launched a full-scale invasion of Kampuchea, occupying the country in two weeks, capturing the capital Phnom Penh, and removing the Khmer Rouge government of the Communist Party of Kampuchea from power. In doing so, Vietnam put an ultimate stop to the Cambodian genocide which had killed between 1.2 and 2.8 million people or between 13 and 30 percent of the country's population since 1975. However, the Khmer Rouge regime maintained its membership in the United Nations and the war isolated Vietnam from the international community except the Eastern Bloc. The Vietnamese occupation caused discontent among Cambodians.

After the Cambodian capital was captured by the Vietnamese, another communist state was established to replace the old regime while the Khmer Rouge was forced to retreat into the jungle near the border with Thailand where the Khmer Rouge alongside the Khmer People's National Liberation Front, led by Son Sann, and FUNCINPEC, led by former king Norodom Sihanouk, continued to fight the Vietnamese army and the pro-Vietnamese Cambodian government. In 1982, they formed the Coalition Government of Democratic Kampuchea. Vietnam's goal of defeating the Khmer Rouge remnants could not be achieved while domestic difficulties forced Vietnam to gradually withdraw its troops. The Vietnamese army completely withdrew in September 1989, and in 1991 the Paris Peace Agreements were signed to open the process of reconciliation between Cambodia's factions, leading to a UN-led transition and the restoration of multi-party rule and a constitutional monarchy in the Kingdom of Cambodia in September 1993.

== History ==
=== Vietnam War ===
"Khmer Rouge" is the name that was popularly given to members of the Communist Party of Kampuchea (CPK) established by separating from the Vietnamese dominated-Indochinese Communist Party (predecessor of the Communist Party of Vietnam). In 1951, Cambodian and Vietnamese communists fought France and its respective associated states, with the Cambodian communists leading the Khmer Issarak and the Vietnamese communists leading the Viet Minh. However, despite both winning and Vietnamese communists gaining North Vietnam north of the 17th parallel, with the Geneva Accords in July 1954, both failed to take control of their respective countries and Cambodian communists were not even allowed to take power anywhere by an agreement that the Vietnamese communists signed on their behalf, which led to the Vietnam War, including the Cambodian Civil War. In the context of the global Cold War, during the Vietnam War, Vietnamese and Cambodian communists again had formed an alliance to fight anti-communist regimes in their respective countries: the Republic of Vietnam (South Vietnam) and the Khmer Republic. Since its founding until 1975, the Khmer Rouge officially maintained good relations with the Communist Party of Vietnam. However, the Khmer Rouge led by Pol Pot also feared that the Vietnamese communists were planning to form an Indochinese federation, which would be dominated by Vietnam. Hanoi support for the Khmer Rouge diminished in 1973. The Khmer Rouge were also harboring irredentist sentiments about the Mekong Delta region. Both eventually took power over their respective countries in April 1975 with Vietnam being officially unified the following year. To pre-empt any attempt by the Vietnamese to dominate them, the Khmer Rouge leadership began, as the Lon Nol government capitulated in 1975, to purge Vietnamese-trained personnel within their own ranks. Then, in May 1975, the Khmer Rouge regime (later known as Democratic Kampuchea) began attacking southern Vietnam, beginning with an attack on the island of Phú Quốc (known as Koh Tral to the Cambodians).

=== Infighting ===
In spite of the fighting, the leaders of reunified Vietnam and Democratic Kampuchea made several public diplomatic exchanges throughout 1976 to highlight the supposedly strong relations between them. However, behind the scenes, Kampuchean leaders continued to fear what they perceived as Vietnamese expansionism. Therefore, on 30 April 1977, they launched another major military attack on Vietnam. Shocked by the Kampuchean assault, Vietnam launched a retaliatory strike at the end of 1977 in an attempt to force the Kampuchean government to negotiate. The Vietnamese military withdrew in January 1978, even though its political objectives had not been achieved; the Khmer Rouge remained unwilling to negotiate seriously.

Small-scale fighting continued between the two countries throughout 1978, as China tried to mediate peace talks between the two sides. However, the two governments could not reach a compromise. By the end of 1978, Vietnamese leaders decided to remove the Khmer Rouge-dominated government of Democratic Kampuchea, perceiving it as being pro-Chinese and hostile towards Vietnam. On 25 December 1978, 150,000 Vietnamese troops invaded Democratic Kampuchea and overran the Kampuchean Revolutionary Army in just two weeks, thereby ending Pol Pot's government, which had been responsible for the deaths of almost a quarter of all Cambodians between 1975 and December 1978 during the Cambodian genocide. Vietnamese military intervention, and the occupying forces' subsequent facilitation of international food aid to mitigate the massive famine, ended the genocide.

=== Establishment of the PRK ===
On 8 January 1979 the pro-Vietnamese People's Republic of Kampuchea (PRK) was established in Phnom Penh, marking the beginning of a ten-year Vietnamese occupation. During that period, the Khmer Rouge's Democratic Kampuchea continued to be recognised by the United Nations as the legitimate government of Kampuchea, as several armed resistance groups were formed to fight the Vietnamese occupation. Throughout the conflict, these groups received training in Thailand from the British Army's Special Air Service. Behind the scenes, Prime Minister Hun Sen of the PRK government approached factions of the Coalition Government of Democratic Kampuchea (CGDK) to begin peace talks. Under diplomatic and economic pressure from the international community, the Vietnamese government implemented a series of economic and foreign policy reforms, and withdrew from Kampuchea in September 1989.

At the Third Jakarta Informal Meeting in 1990, under the Australian-sponsored Cambodian Peace Plan, representatives of the CGDK and the PRK agreed to a power-sharing arrangement by forming a unity government known as the Supreme National Council (SNC). The SNC's role was to represent Cambodian sovereignty on the international stage, while the United Nations Transitional Authority in Cambodia (UNTAC) was tasked with supervising the country's domestic policies until a Cambodian government was elected by the people. Cambodia's pathway to peace proved to be difficult, as Khmer Rouge leaders decided not to participate in the general elections, but instead chose to disrupt the electoral process by launching military attacks on UN peacekeepers and killing ethnic Vietnamese migrants. In May 1993, Sihanouk's FUNCINPEC movement defeated the Cambodian People's Party (CPP), formerly the Kampuchean People's Revolutionary Party (KPRP), to win the general elections. However, the CPP leadership refused to accept defeat, and announced that the eastern provinces of Cambodia, where most of the CPP's votes were drawn from, would secede from Cambodia. To avoid such an outcome, Norodom Ranariddh, the leader of FUNCINPEC, agreed to form a coalition government with the CPP. Shortly afterward, the constitutional monarchy was restored and the Khmer Rouge was outlawed by the newly formed Cambodian government.

=== Cambodian–Vietnamese history ===
Angkor, the seat of the Khmer Empire, was subjected to Vietnamese influence as early as the 13th century. Vietnamese influence spread gradually and indirectly, and it was not until the early 19th century that Vietnam exercised direct control. However, Vietnamese attempts to annex Cambodia began in the 17th century when Vietnamese forces of the Nguyen domain in Cochinchina helped Cambodian dissidents topple its only Muslim king, Ramathipadi I. From then on, Nguyen lords and their successors, Nguyen emperors frequently intervened in Cambodia. In 1813, Nak Ong Chan gained the Cambodian throne with the help of Vietnam, and under his rule Cambodia became a protectorate. Following his death in 1834, the Vietnamese empire under Minh Mang, who held strong Confucian beliefs, annexed and colonised Cambodia. Cambodia was governed under a Vietnamese administration in Phnom Penh and termed a Vietnamese province. The Vietnamese emperor attempted to erase Khmer culture, which had derived the basis of Cambodian society, dress, and religion from India rather than China. The trend of Vietnamese dominance continued during French colonisation, under which the former southern region of Cambodia (the Saigon region, the Mekong Delta and Tây Ninh) was integrated into the French colony Cochinchina. The Khmer Rouge later justified their incursions into Vietnam as an attempt to regain the territories which Cambodia had lost during the previous centuries.

=== Rise of communism ===
The communist movement in Cambodia and Vietnam began before World War II with the founding of the Indochinese Communist Party (ICP), almost exclusively dominated by the Vietnamese, originally meant to fight French colonial rule in Indochina. In 1941, Nguyen Ai Quoc (commonly known by his alias Ho Chi Minh) founded the Viet Nam Doc Lap Dong Minh Hoi, or the Viet Minh. After the Japanese army claimed to surrender to the Allies in World War II, his force overthrew the Vietnamese monarchy and later initiated the First Indochina War against the French. During this time, Vietnamese forces made extensive use of Cambodian territory to transport weapons, supplies, and troops. This relationship lasted throughout the Vietnam War, when Vietnamese communists used Cambodia as a transport route and staging area for attacks on South Vietnam.

In 1951, Vietnamese communists guided the establishment of a separate Cambodian communist party, the Kampuchean People's Revolutionary Party (KPRP), which allied with a nationalist separatist Cambodian movement, the Khmer Serei (Free Khmers), to pursue independence. In accordance with the 1954 Geneva Accords on Indochina negotiating the end of the war between communist resistance forces and the French Union, newly created communist North Vietnam pulled all of its Viet Minh soldiers and cadres out of Cambodia. Since the KPRP was staffed primarily by ethnic Vietnamese or Cambodians under its tutelage, approximately 5,000 communist cadres went with them.

The power vacuum the Vietnamese communists left in their wake in Cambodia was soon filled by the return of a young group of Cambodian communist revolutionaries, many of whom received their education in France. In 1960, the KPRP changed its name to the Kampuchean Communist Party (KCP), and the name was later adopted by the majority coalition that formed around Saloth Sar (Pol Pot), Ieng Sary, and Khieu Samphan as the successor to the KCP. This clique became the genesis of the Khmer Rouge, and its doctrine was heavily influenced by Maoist ideology.

=== Lon Nol's anti-Vietnamese sentiment ===
After the removal of Sihanouk from power in March 1970, the leader of the new Khmer Republic, Lon Nol, despite being anti-communist and ostensibly in the "pro-American" camp, backed the FULRO against both anti-communist South Vietnam and the communist Viet Cong. Following the 1970 coup, thousands of Vietnamese Cambodians were massacred by forces of Lon Nol. Many of the dead were dumped in the Mekong River. 310,000 ethnic Vietnamese fled Cambodia as a result. The Khmer Rouge would later murder the remaining Vietnamese in the country during their rule.

=== Ideology of the Khmer Rouge ===
The Khmer Rouge government adopted the mysterious term Angkar, or 'the organisation', and the identities of its leaders remained confidential until 1977. The official head of state was Khieu Samphan, but the two men in control of the party were Pol Pot and Ieng Sary. The ultimate objective of the Khmer Rouge was to erase the structure of the Cambodian state, which they viewed as feudal, capitalist, and serving the agendas of both the landholding elite and imperialists. In its place, they hoped to create a classless society based entirely on worker-peasants. The radical ideologies and goals of the Khmer Rouge were alien concepts to the masses. The socialist revolution held very little popular appeal, which led Pol Pot and his cadres to use ultra-nationalist sentiment, repressive and murderous rule, and propaganda aimed at demonising the Vietnamese to maintain control.

A major point of departure between the Khmer Rouge faction and the Vietnam-aligned Communist Party of Kampuchea, which has favored more classical Marxism–Leninist ideology, was the Khmer Rouge's embrace of a nationalistic form of Maoism, one of the few major communist parties to do so in the wake of the Sino-Soviet split. This served as the basis for the Khmer Rouge's agrarian policies.

Even before the Vietnam War ended, the relationship between the Khmer Rouge—which was in the process of seizing power from a US-backed government headed by Lon Nol—and North Vietnam was strained. Clashes between Vietnamese communists and Khmer Rouge forces began as early as 1974, and the following year Pol Pot signed a treaty codifying the "friendship" between the Khmer Rouge and China.

== Diplomacy and military action ==
=== 1975–1976: From fighting to building friendly relations ===
With the Fall of Phnom Penh and later the Fall of Saigon in April 1975, the communists completely took power in their respective countries. However this immediately brought a new conflict between Vietnam and Cambodia. Although the North Vietnamese and the Khmer Rouge had previously fought side by side, the leaders of the newly created Democratic Kampuchea continued to view Vietnam with great suspicion, because they believed the Vietnamese communists had never given up their dream of creating an Indochinese federation with Vietnam as the leader. For that reason, the Kampuchean government removed all North Vietnamese military forces from Kampuchean territory shortly after their capture of Phnom Penh on 17 April 1975. In the first major clash between the two former allies, the Kampuchean Revolutionary Army (KRA) invaded the Vietnamese island of Phú Quốc on 1 May 1975 (barely 24 hours after Saigon fell), claiming it was historically part of Kampuchea's territory.

Nine days later, on 10 May 1975, the KRA continued its incursion by capturing the Thổ Chu Islands, where it executed 500 Vietnamese civilians. The Vietnamese military immediately responded to Kampuchean actions by launching a counterattack and removing Kampuchean forces from Phú Quốc and Thổ Chu, and then invading the Kampuchean island of Koh Poulo Wai. In June 1975, while on a visit to Hanoi, Pol Pot proposed that Vietnam and his country should sign a treaty of friendship and begin discussions on border disputes. However, those discussions never materialised, and the Kampucheans claimed that Vietnam turned down both offers. In August 1975, Vietnam returned the island of Koh Poulo Wai to Kampuchea and formally recognised Kampuchean sovereignty over the island.

Following those incidents, both countries attempted to improve their diplomatic relations with a series of congratulatory messages and exchange visits. On 17 April 1976, Vietnamese leaders sent a message to congratulate Khieu Samphan, Nuon Chea and Pol Pot on their "elections" as president, President of the People's Representatives and Premier of Kampuchea, respectively. Furthermore, the Vietnamese even denounced the alleged "U.S. bombing" of Siem Reap in February 1976, thereby reinforcing the Kampucheans' fictitious claims over the incident. In response, in June 1976, the Kampuchean leadership sent a message to the Provisional Revolutionary Government of the Republic of South Vietnam, which had governed South Vietnam since the fall of Saigon, congratulating them on the seventh anniversary of their establishment.

In July 1976, following the establishment of the Socialist Republic of Vietnam as a reunified country, Phnom Penh Radio broadcast a commentary which proclaimed the "militant solidarity and friendship between peoples of Democratic Kampuchea and the Socialist Republic of Vietnam grow constantly greener and sturdier". However, during that same month, Pol Pot publicly hinted at tensions between Vietnam and Kampuchea when he told a visiting Vietnamese media delegation that there were "obstacles and difficulties" in the relationship between the two countries. Nonetheless, on 21 September 1976, the first air service connecting Hanoi and Ho Chi Minh City with Phnom Penh was established. Then in December 1976, the Kampuchean Revolutionary Organisation sent greetings to the Vietnamese Communist Party during their Fourth Congress.

=== 1977: Incursions and build-up to war ===
Towards the end of 1976, while Vietnam and Kampuchea publicly appeared to be improving their relationships, the private suspicions of both countries' leadership grew. From the Vietnamese perspective, they were the patrons of genuine Marxist–Leninist revolutions in Southeast Asia, so it was vital for them to exercise control over the Kampucheans and the Laotians. Indeed, that was the reason North Vietnam supported the Khmer Rouge during their fight against the Lon Nol government, in the hope that the Kampuchean communists would adopt a pro-Vietnamese line upon their victory in the same way as the Pathet Lao had done. However, their hopes were dashed as early as 1973, because People's Army of Vietnam (PAVN) formations operating in Khmer Rouge-occupied territories were occasionally subjected to armed attacks by their allies. The Vietnamese position inside Kampuchea was further weakened after the end of the war, as there were no pro-Vietnamese elements left within the Kampuchean Communist Party.

When the pro-Chinese Pol Pot and his brother-in-law Ieng Sary resigned from their respective positions as premier and foreign minister in September 1976, Vietnamese prime minister Phạm Văn Đồng and General Secretary of the Communist Party Lê Duẩn were optimistic that Vietnam could exercise greater influence on the Kampucheans. In a private meeting with the Soviet ambassador to Vietnam on 16 November 1976, Lê Duẩn dismissed both Ieng Sary and Pol Pot as "bad people" for their pro-Chinese policies. Le Duan then asserted that Nuon Chea, who had ascended to the position of Premier of Democratic Kampuchea as Pol Pot's replacement, was a person of pro-Vietnamese orientation, so Vietnam could exercise its influence through him. However, the events which developed over the next few months would prove Lê Duẩn had been mistaken in his assessment of Nuon Chea.

Meanwhile, in Phnom Penh, the Kampuchean leadership had developed a fear and hatred of the Vietnamese leadership as a result of Vietnam's historical dominance over their country. From the Kampuchean perspective, the Vietnamese strategy to dominate Indochina involved infiltrating the communist parties of Kampuchea and Laos with Vietnamese-trained cadres. For that reason, when the first group of North Vietnamese-trained Khmer Rouge personnel returned to the country, they were immediately purged from the KCP. During the months following the defeat of the Lon Nol government, Pol Pot continued to purge the KCP and the Government of Democratic Kampuchea of those who he believed to be Soviet and Vietnamese agents. Then, in the context of the triumphalism that prevailed among the Khmer Rouge leadership—they claimed they had single-handedly defeated the "American imperialists"—Democratic Kampuchea began preparing for war against Vietnam.

As the KRA made preparations for its war against Vietnam, state-controlled media in Vietnam sent congratulatory messages to the Government of the Democratic Kampuchea on the second anniversary of its establishment, on 17 April 1977. On 30 April 1977, the second anniversary of the fall of Saigon, the Kampuchean reply came in the form of a military attack against the Vietnamese provinces of An Giang and Châu Đốc, killing hundreds of Vietnamese civilians. The PAVN responded by moving its troops to areas attacked by Kampuchea and, on 7 June 1977, Vietnam proposed high-level talks to discuss outstanding issues. On 18 June 1977, the Kampuchean Government replied by demanding that Vietnam remove all of its military units from the disputed areas, and create a demilitarised zone between the opposing forces.

Both sides ignored each other's proposals, and the KRA continued sending soldiers across the border to attack Vietnamese towns and villages. In September 1977, KRA artillery struck several Vietnamese villages along the border, and six villages in Đồng Tháp Province were overrun by Kampuchean infantry. Shortly afterwards, six divisions of the KRA advanced about 10 km (6.2 mi) into Tay Ninh Province, where they killed more than 1,000 Vietnamese civilians in Tân Biên district. Angered by the scale of Kampuchean assaults, the PAVN assembled eight divisions, estimated at 60,000 soldiers, to launch a retaliatory strike against Kampuchea. On 16 December 1977, the PAVN divisions, with support from elements of the Vietnam People's Air Force, crossed the border along several axes with the objective of forcing the Kampuchean Government to negotiate.

On the battlefield, the KRA quickly lost ground to the Vietnamese. By the end of December 1977, Vietnam had won a clear military victory over Kampuchea, as Vietnamese formations marched through Svay Rieng Province and only stopped short of entering the provincial capital. Despite the ferocity of the Vietnamese retaliation, the Kampuchean Government remained defiant. On 31 December 1977, Khieu Sampham declared that the Kampuchean Government would "temporarily" sever diplomatic relations with Vietnam until the Vietnamese military withdrew from the "sacred territory of Democratic Kampuchea". On 6 January 1978, PAVN divisions were only 38 km (24 mi) from Phnom Penh, but the Vietnamese Government decided to withdraw its forces from Kampuchea because they had failed to achieve Vietnam's political objective. During the withdrawal, the PAVN also evacuated thousands of prisoners and civilian refugees, including future leader Hun Sen.

=== 1978: Preparations for regime change ===
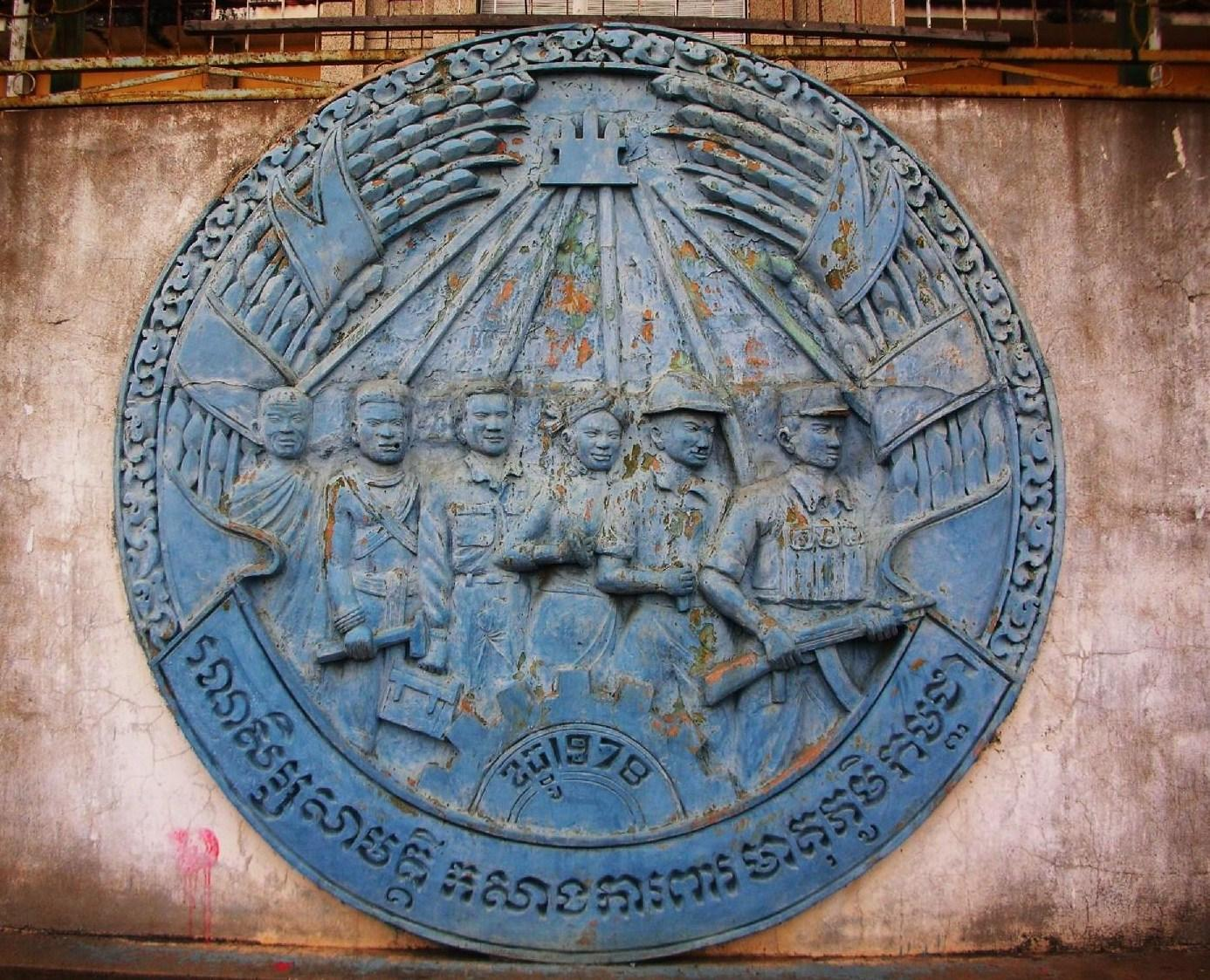
The emblem of the Kampuchean United Front for National Salvation

Instead of being sobered by the Vietnamese show of force, the Kampuchean government boasted that the Vietnamese withdrawal was a major victory for Democratic Kampuchea, comparing it to the "defeat of U.S. imperialism" on 17 April 1975. The Kampucheans went on further to proclaim that "our 6 January victory over the annexationist, Vietnamese aggressor enemy has given all of us greater confidence in the forces of our people and nation, in our Kampuchean Communist Party and our Kampuchean Revolutionary Army, and in our Party's line of people's war".

The Kampuchean leadership claimed that one Kampuchean soldier was equal to 30 Vietnamese soldiers, so if Kampuchea could raise two million soldiers from a population of eight million, it could wipe out Vietnam's population of 50 million and still have six million people left. In reality, Kampuchean leaders simply ignored the condition of the population in their own country and Vietnam; the Vietnamese, though poor, were in good physical condition, while Kampuchea's population was physically and mentally exhausted from years of hard labour, starvation and disease.

In addition to the disparity in population, there was also a great disparity between the fighting capabilities of the armed forces of the two countries. In 1977, Vietnam was estimated to have 615,000 soldiers and 900 tanks, supported by a 12,000-member air force with 300 combat aircraft, including one squadron of light bombers. In comparison, Kampuchea had an army of 70,000, only a few heavy tanks, 200 armoured vehicles and limited air capability. Despite facing such heavy odds, Kampuchea showed no signs of hesitation as its military continued to assault Vietnam's border regions. In January 1978, KRA forces still held portions of Vietnamese territory and began overrunning Vietnamese outposts in Hà Tiên Province. On 27 January 1978, Vietnam started calling on the KRA along the border regions to overthrow the Khmer Rouge government.

Against the backdrop of military clashes, between 9 January and 20 February 1978, Vietnamese Deputy Foreign Minister Phan Hien made several trips to Beijing to hold discussions with representatives of the Kampuchean government, which ultimately proved to be fruitless. On 18 January 1978, China attempted to mediate between Kampuchea and Vietnam when Vice Premier Deng Yingchao (widow of Zhou Enlai) travelled to Phnom Penh, where her effort was met with strong resistance by Kampuchean leaders. Meanwhile, Vietnamese government officials began conducting secret meetings with So Phim, the Khmer Rouge leader in Kampuchea's Eastern Military Zone, to plan a military uprising backed by Vietnam. During that same period, military setbacks experienced by the KRA in the Eastern Military Zone prompted Pol Pot to label the region as a "nest of traitors".

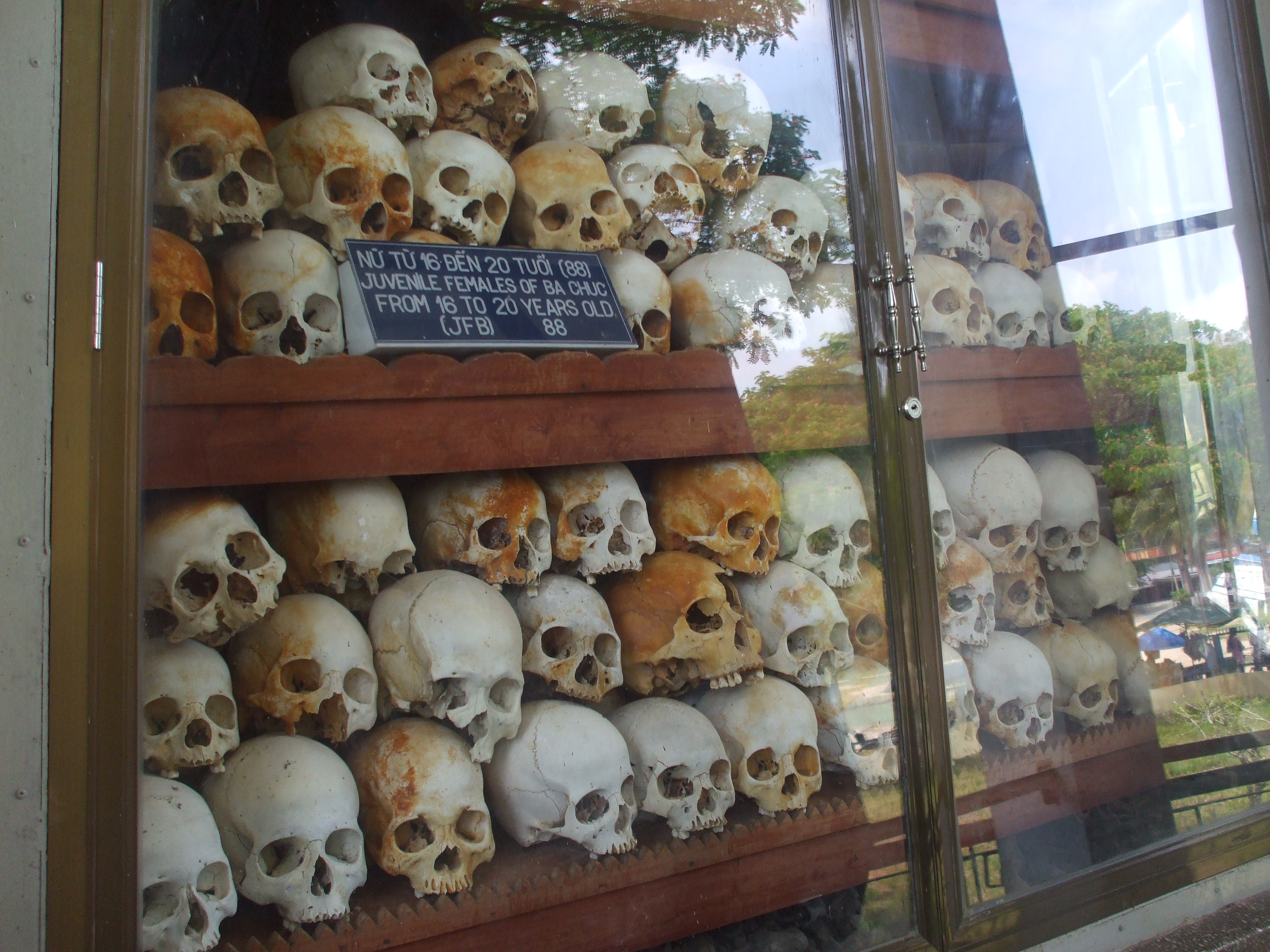
Skulls of victims of the Ba Chúc Massacre

To purge the Eastern Military Zone of those he perceived to have been contaminated by the Vietnamese, Pol Pot ordered military units from the Southwest Zone to move into eastern Kampuchea and eliminate the "hidden traitors". Unable to withstand an attack from the Kampuchea Government, So Phim committed suicide while his deputy Heng Samrin defected to Vietnam. On 12 April 1978, the Kampuchean government declared they and Vietnam could negotiate again if the Vietnamese gave up their expansionist ambitions and recognised Kampuchea's sovereignty. However, there was also a pre-condition requiring Vietnam to meet several obligations through a seven-month trial ceasefire. The Vietnamese government immediately rejected the demand. In response, two KRA divisions penetrated up to 2 km (1.2 mi) into Vietnamese territory and massacred over 3,000 Vietnamese civilians in the village of Ba Chúc in An Giang Province.

In June 1978, the VPAF started bombing KRA positions along the border regions, flying about 30 bombing sorties per day and inflicting heavy casualties on the Kampucheans. By that stage in the conflict, most surviving leaders of the Eastern Military Zone had escaped into Vietnam, where they assembled at various secret camps with the purpose of forming a Vietnamese-backed "liberation army" to fight against the Khmer Rouge government.

Meanwhile, the Vietnamese Communist Party Politburo was meeting in Hanoi to discuss its strategy for Kampuchea. It concluded that the Khmer Rouge government was a proxy of China, which had been trying to fill the power vacuum following the withdrawal of the United States. As such, China was identified as Vietnam's main enemy, and its client government in Phnom Penh had to be removed by conventional military force, because the Vietnamese adaptation of the Maoist "people's war" doctrine had not been a success against the Khmer Rouge's security apparatus.

To reflect the attitude of the country's leaders, Vietnam's state-controlled media stepped up its propaganda war against the Khmer Rouge, with the official Nhân Dân newspaper regularly calling for international intervention to save the Kampuchean people from domestic terror initiated by the Khmer Rouge government. Furthermore, instead of sending congratulatory messages as they had done in the previous years, the Vietnamese media changed their tone and began referring to the Kampuchean Government as the "Pol Pot-Ieng Sary clique" as the Kampuchean military continued their campaign in Vietnam.

By the end of June, the Vietnamese military assembled a multi-division task force to launch another limited-objective campaign against the Kampucheans. Again, the Vietnamese pushed the KRA forces back into the provincial cities of Suong and Prey Veng and then pulled out. However, as they had done before, the KRA moved its artillery back towards the border and continued shelling Vietnamese villages as though nothing had happened.

In total around 30,000 Vietnamese civilians were killed in the border confict from 1975 to 1978 according to the Vietnamese government. Around 20,000 PAVN soldiers were also killed, as well as 15,000 KRA soldiers.

During the second half of 1978, Vietnamese leaders devoted much of their energy towards the military campaign against the Khmer Rouge government, by seeking political support from the Soviet Union. In a briefing with Vietnamese Foreign Ministry officials on 25 July 1978, the Soviet chargé d'affaires in Hanoi was told that the Kampuchean Government had deployed 14 of its 17 regular army divisions and 16 local regiments along the border with Vietnam. Then, in early September 1978, Lê Duẩn informed the Soviet ambassador that Vietnam aimed to "solve fully this question of Kampuchea by the beginning of 1979". While Vietnam was laying the political foundation for the military campaign against Kampuchea, Soviet ships were reported to be unloading military hardware and ammunition in Cam Ranh Bay. In October 1978, Vietnamese radio broadcast what it claimed were accounts of uprisings against the Khmer Rouge government, urging members of the KRA either to overthrow the "Pol Pot-Ieng Sary clique" or defect to Vietnam.

In a major turning point in the course of Soviet-Vietnamese and Sino-Vietnamese diplomatic relations, and ultimately the Vietnamese invasion of Kampuchea, a Treaty of Friendship and Cooperation was signed between Vietnam and the Soviet Union on 3 November 1978, which guaranteed the former of vital Soviet military aid in the scenario that China intervened in the conflict. Later, in November 1978, a command and control headquarters was established for the planned invasion of Kampuchea, with Senior General Lê Đức Anh taking full control of PAVN units along the border areas.

The Vietnamese government drafted 350,000 men into the military to replace earlier losses and augment its units along the border. While the new recruits were completing training, ten divisions were deployed to the border regions of Long An, Đồng Tháp and Tây Ninh Provinces. Vietnam also shifted three divisions based in Laos south towards the Laos-Kampuchea border. On 13 December 1978, the Chinese Government warned Vietnam that its patience was limited, and that Vietnam would be punished if it behaved in an "unbridled fashion".

The final piece of the Vietnamese strategy emerged when Vietnam announced the formation of the Kampuchean United Front for National Salvation (KUFNS) in the "liberation zones" of Kampuchea. Hanoi claimed that KUFNS was an independent Kampuchean communist movement, with members drawn from all walks of life. Heng Samrin, formerly a member of the Khmer Rouge and commander of the KRA 4th Division, was the chairman of the KUFNS Central Committee. Previously, the KUFNS was known as the Provisional Revolutionary Government of Kampuchea (PRGK), which consisted of 300 former Khmer Rouge cadres who defected to Vietnam. The PRGK regularly sent representatives abroad in search of support, before Vietnam abandoned the "people's war" concept in favour of a conventional military campaign.

Not to be outdone by the Vietnamese military build-up, the Government of Democratic Kampuchea was busy strengthening its armed forces with Chinese support. In previous years, China had only provided the KRA with a limited quantities of arms and ammunition, but as relations with Vietnam worsened in 1978, Beijing established additional supply routes through Kampuchea and increased the volume of military hardware which travelled down each route. On the eve of the Vietnamese invasion, Kampuchea had an estimated 73,000 soldiers in the Eastern Military Zone bordering Vietnam.

At that time, all branches of the Kampuchean armed forces were significantly strengthened by large quantities of Chinese-made military equipment, which included fighter aircraft, patrol boats, heavy artillery, anti-aircraft guns, trucks and tanks. Additionally, there were between 10,000 and 20,000 Chinese advisers in both military and civilian capacities, providing their support to the Khmer Rouge government. Finally, China's PLA stationed a few hundred thousand soldiers on its own border with Vietnam (which would eventually be deployed in the brief Sino-Vietnamese War), as well as nearly two million soldiers in its border with the Soviet Union.

== Course of the War ==
=== Invasion of Kampuchea ===
==== Military offensive and the fall of Pol Pot's regime ====
On 21 December 1978, Kampuchea's new-found strength was tested when a Vietnamese offensive, consisting of two divisions, crossed the border and moved towards the town of Kratié, while other support divisions were deployed along local routes to cut off the logistical tail of Kampuchean units. Despite enjoying generous support from China, the KRA could not withstand the Vietnamese offensive and suffered heavy casualties. On 23 December 1978, 10 out of 19 divisions of Khmer Rouge's military divisions opened fire along the shared Southwestern borderline with Vietnam. On 25 December 1978, Vietnam launched a full-scale invasion using 13 divisions, estimated at 150,000 soldiers.

Initially, Kampuchea directly challenged Vietnam's military might through conventional fighting methods, but this tactic resulted in the loss of half of the KRA within two weeks. Heavy defeats on the battlefield prompted much of the Kampuchean leadership to evacuate towards the western region of the country. On 7 January 1979, the PAVN entered Phnom Penh along with members of the KUFNS. On the following day, a pro-Vietnamese Kampuchean state, known as the People's Republic of Kampuchea (PRK), was established, with Heng Samrin as the Chief of State and Pen Sovan as General Secretary of the newly refounded Kampuchean People's Revolutionary Party.

The Khmer Rouge leadership, with much of its political and military structures shattered by the Vietnamese invasion, was forced to take refuge in Thailand. The Thai government under Kriangsak Chamanan accommodated the Khmer Rouge refugees, in exchange for a promise by Deng Xiaoping to end material support to Thailand's insurgent communists. Despite the overwhelming economic challenges brought by the Khmer Rouge and the accompanying refugees, the Thai Government sheltered and protected the Khmer Rouge at Khao Larn camp in Trat Province.

Meanwhile, in Phnom Penh, the new Kampuchean government tried to rebuild the country's economic and social life, which was largely destroyed by decades of political upheavals and constant warfare. However, efforts to rebuild the country were severely hampered by the lack of educated and qualified personnel, as most educated people had either fled the country or had been murdered by the Khmer Rouge government during the previous four years. By the end of the year, the new government's attempts at nation-building were further challenged by several anti-Vietnamese resistance groups operating in the western regions of the country.

==== International response ====
Shortly after the capture of Phnom Penh, representatives of Democratic Kampuchea called for an emergency meeting of the United Nations Security Council, so Prince Sihanouk could present the deposed government's case. Despite strong objections from the Soviet Union and Czechoslovakia, the UN Security Council gave Sihanouk this chance. Although Sihanouk distanced himself from the human rights abuses of the Khmer Rouge, he accused Vietnam of using aggression to violate Kampuchea's sovereignty. As such, he demanded all UN countries suspend aid to Vietnam and not recognise the Vietnamese-installed government.

Subsequently, seven non-aligned members of the UN Security Council (Note: Bangladesh, Bolivia, Gabon, Jamaica, Kuwait, Nigeria and Zambia) submitted draft resolution S/13027 calling for a ceasefire and the withdrawal of all foreign forces from Kampuchea, which was endorsed by China, France, Norway, Portugal, the United States and the United Kingdom. However, the resolution was not approved due to opposition from the Soviet Union and Czechoslovakia.

Between 16 and 19 February 1979, Vietnam and the new Kampuchean government held a summit meeting which concluded with the two countries signing a Treaty of Peace, Friendship and Cooperation. Article 2 of the treaty stated that the security of Vietnam and Kampuchea were interrelated; thus they would help defend each other "against schemes and acts of sabotage by the imperialist and international reactionary forces", thereby legitimising the presence of Vietnamese troops on Kampuchean soil. Soon afterwards, the Soviet Union, the socialist countries of Eastern Europe (except Romania) and India recognised the Vietnamese-installed People's Republic of Kampuchea. The Soviet government praised the PRK's "remarkable victory" and expressed its full support for the government's advance towards socialism. Furthermore, the Soviets harshly criticised the Khmer Rouge government's record of terror, which they implied had been imposed by China.

At the 34th Session of the UN General Assembly, representatives of the People's Republic of Kampuchea and Democratic Kampuchea both claimed the right to represent their country. The former also notified the member nations of the UN Security Council that it was the sole legitimate representative of Kampuchea and its people. In response, the UN Credentials Committee decided to recognise Democratic Kampuchea by a vote of six to three, despite the Khmer Rouge's blood-stained record while in power. Accordingly, representatives of Democratic Kampuchea were allowed to be seated in the General Assembly, with strong support from China.

By January 1980, 29 countries had established diplomatic relations with the People's Republic of Kampuchea, yet nearly 80 countries still recognised the legitimacy of the deposed Democratic Kampuchea. At the same time, the Western powers and the member countries of the Association of Southeast Asian Nations (ASEAN) also voiced strong condemnation of Vietnam's use of force to remove the Khmer Rouge government.

The United States called for "two withdrawals". It argued that Vietnam should withdraw from Cambodia and that China should withdraw from Vietnam, which it had invaded on 17 February 1979 in the Sino-Vietnamese War.

Thailand, which shared an 800-kilometre (500-mile) border with Kampuchea and has historically feared Vietnam's expansionism, demanded that Vietnam immediately remove its troops from Kampuchea so that its people could elect a government free from foreign intervention. Indonesia, Malaysia, the Philippines and Singapore showed their support for Thailand's position. Furthermore, ASEAN viewed Vietnam's invasion and subsequent occupation of Kampuchea, which received strong Soviet support, as an intolerable threat to the region's security and stability. That view was shared by China, which went as far as accusing Vietnam of forcing Kampuchea into an Indochinese federation to serve as an outpost of Soviet global hegemony. The United States, which never maintained any form of diplomatic ties with the Khmer Rouge's Democratic Kampuchea, showed strong support for the membership of their former enemy in the UN General Assembly, and echoed ASEAN's call for an immediate withdrawal of Vietnamese military forces from Kampuchea.

In addition, North Korea, whose leader Kim Il Sung had offered Sihanouk sanctuary after he was ousted by Lon Nol in 1970, also refused to recognize the People's Republic of Kampuchea.

Romania was the only country in the Eastern Bloc that supported the Khmer Rouge and did not recognize the newly installed People's Republic of Kampuchea. Before the war broke out, Nicolae Ceaușescu warned Lê Duẩn that Vietnam would lose its international support the moment they invaded Cambodia. The invasion that followed set an uncomfortable precedent for the Romanian leadership, after Ceaușescu had condemned the Warsaw Pact invasion of Czechoslovakia in 1968, where the Soviets would attempt to topple him.

==== Chinese invasion of Vietnam ====
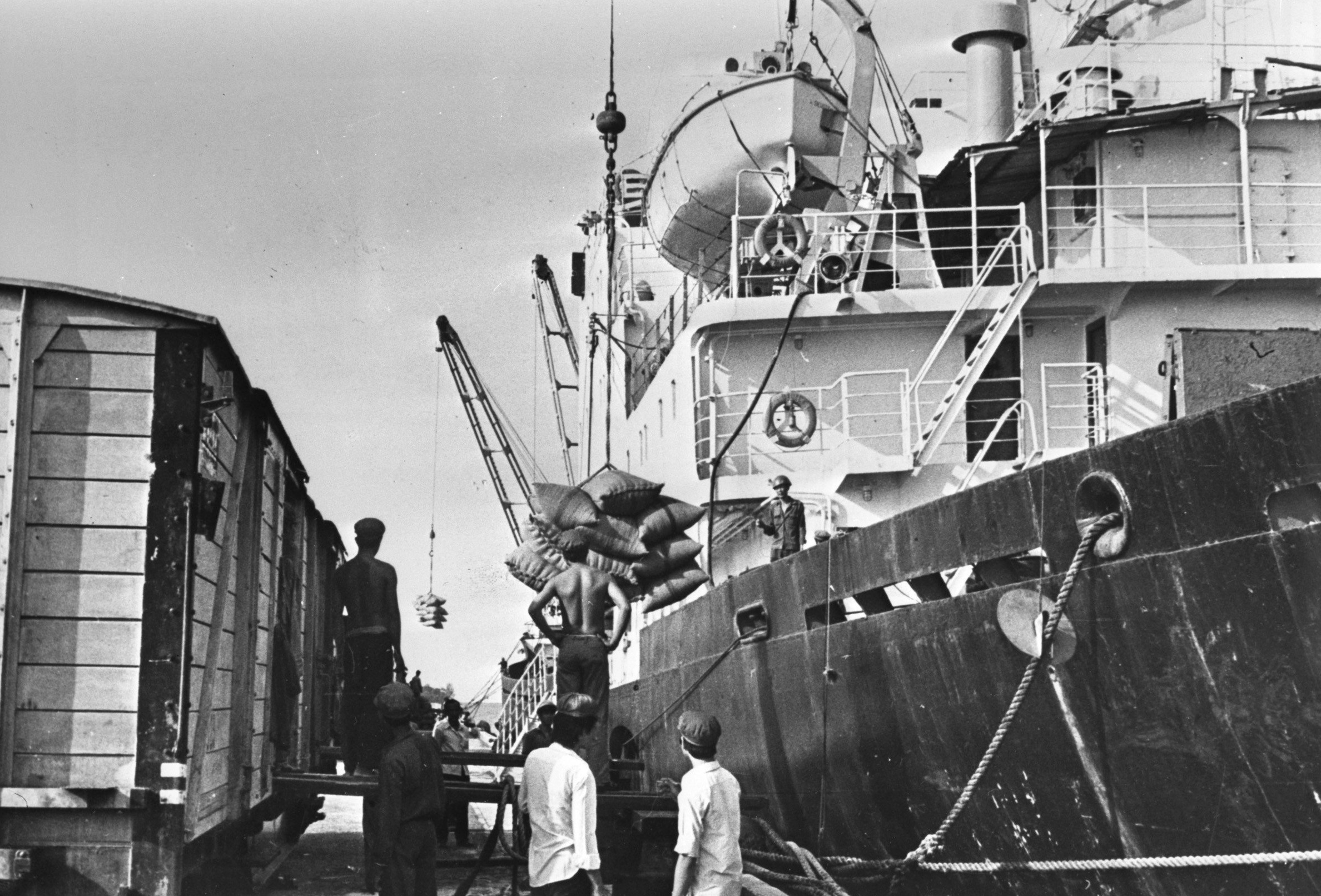
A Soviet ship with humanitarian aid, Sihanoukville, Cambodia, November 1979

China invaded Vietnam on 17 February 1979, aiming to capture the capitals of its border provinces to force a Vietnamese withdrawal from Cambodia. The invasion was bogged down by resistance from local militias and some regular army reinforcements; nevertheless, the Chinese army captured Cao Bằng and Lào Cai after three weeks and Lạng Sơn after a month. The following day, China announced that it would not move deeper into Vietnam, apparently after meeting unexpectedly harsh resistance by well-trained Vietnamese forces equipped with Soviet and captured American weapons. Furthermore, Vietnam's politburo had ordered a general mobilization and begun planning for full conscription. The Chinese subsequently withdrew their forces. However, some Western intelligence analysts assessed the result of the war from another angle: in their view, Vietnam's forces and supplies had been depleted beyond the point where Hanoi could offer significant resistance or even pursue the retreating Chinese.

Although China failed either to decisively win the 27-day conflict or to force a withdrawal of Vietnamese forces in Cambodia, the diversion of troops from Kampuchea facilitated a resurgence in Khmer Rouge insurgent operations, making it unavoidable for the young PRK government in Kampuchea to implement conscription.

The majority of diplomats and analysts concluded that China's long-term strategy was to stretch Vietnamese resources by having the Vietnamese divert their resources from other problems to the border conflict. Problems include Vietnam's difficulties integrating South Vietnam with the North, the burden of administrating Laos and occupying Cambodia, and economic problems caused by two years of disastrous weather.

China strengthened its relations with ASEAN countries – particularly Thailand and Singapore – due to their fear of Vietnamese aggression. Singapore's prime minister Lee Kuan Yew wrote in 2000: "The Western press wrote off the Chinese punitive action as a failure. I believe it changed the history of East Asia." In contrast, Vietnam's decreasing prestige in the region led it to be more dependent on the Soviet Union, to which it leased a naval base at Cam Ranh Bay. Former U.S. secretary of state Henry Kissinger wrote that "China succeeded in exposing the limits of...[Soviet] strategic reach" and speculated that the desire to "compensate for their ineffectuality" contributed to the Soviets' decision to intervene in Afghanistan a year later.

=== KPNLF and FUNCINPEC insurgencies ===
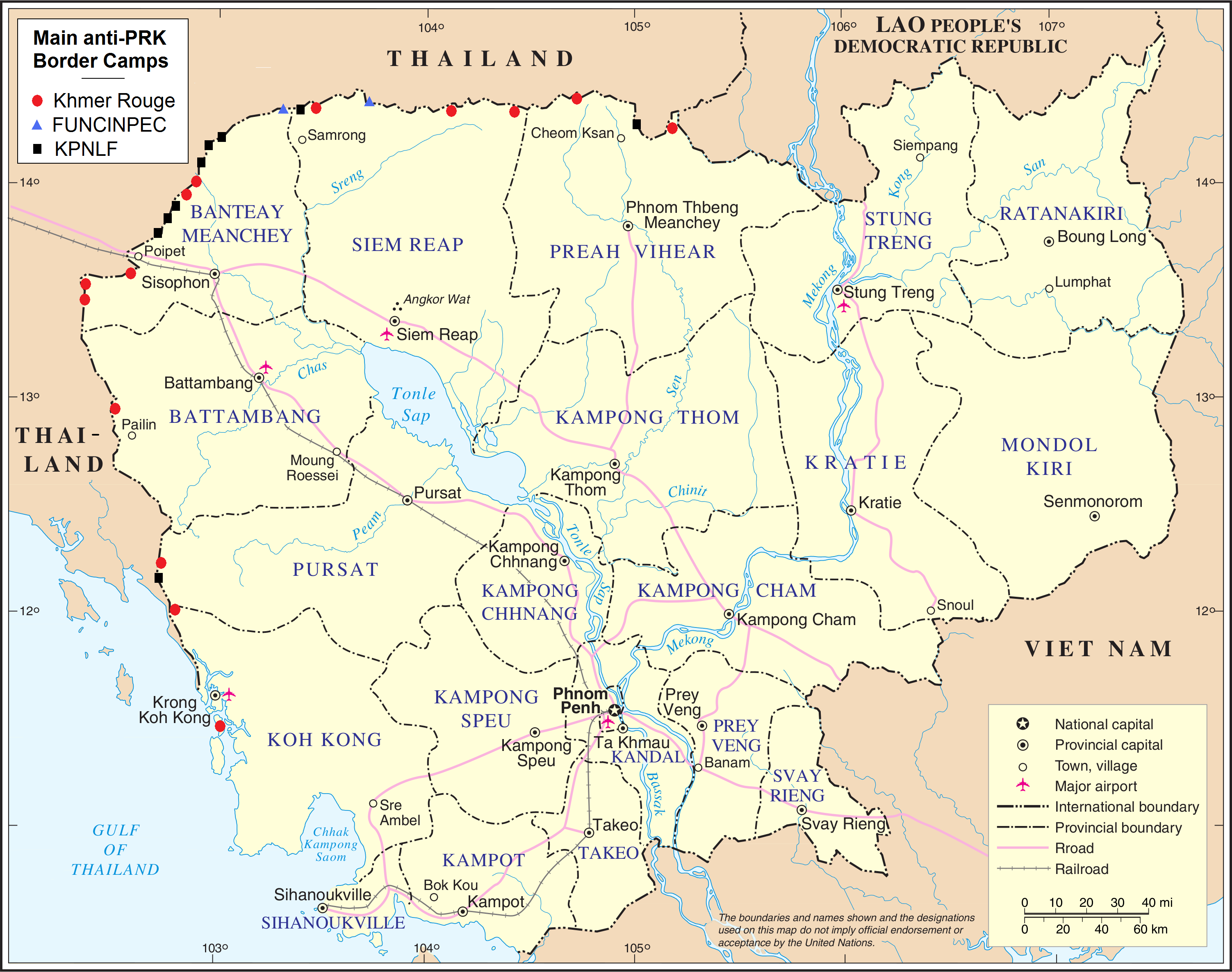
Camps on the Thai-Cambodia border hostile to the PRK, 1979–1984. KPNLF camps shown in black.

When the Khmer Rouge government was removed from power in January 1979, the Kampuchean people hoped that peace and liberty would return to their country. This was reinforced by the Constitution of the People's Republic of Kampuchea (PRK), proclaimed in 1981, which specifically stated that Kampuchea was an independent, peaceful state where power belonged to the people. However, there was a deep contrast between what was written in the constitution and reality, because the Kampuchean people began to despair at what they viewed as the Vietnamese occupation of their country, rather than a liberation that had freed them from the brutality of Democratic Kampuchea.

That perception was reinforced by the presence of Vietnamese advisers who worked at every level of Heng Samrin's Kampuchean Government. In 1986, for example, there was one Vietnamese adviser for every Kampuchean cabinet minister and one adviser for each one of their three deputy ministers. Furthermore, it was reported that final decisions made by a Kampuchean minister had to receive final approval from the Vietnamese adviser, who usually dictated policies.

Opposition to the Vietnamese was further fomented by human rights abuses committed by the Vietnamese and their allies. To fulfill its K5 Plan, a construction project to strengthen the Cambodia-Thai border, the PRK government conscripted 380,000 people, with large numbers succumbing to malaria. Claude Malhuret of Médecins Sans Frontières reported that a tactic the Vietnamese and KPRAF used to fight the Khmer Rouge was to withhold food from areas controlled by the Khmer Rouge. Thousands of tons of food provided by international relief organizations spoiled on the docks of Kompong Som. Food sent by aid organisations was often instead used to feed Vietnamese troops and Cambodians living under Vietnamese control.

To resist the Vietnamese occupation of Kampuchea and the government which they installed, the Khmer Rouge called on the Kampuchean people to unite and fight the Vietnamese. However, due to the brutality which they had experienced under the deposed government, many Kampucheans believed that any political movement aimed at restoring national freedom must oppose both the Khmer Rouge and the Vietnamese. In response to such preconditions, two non-communist movements were formed to fight the Vietnamese occupation.

The first group, a right-wing and pro-Western organisation, was formed in October 1979 by former prime minister Son Sann and was called the Khmer People's National Liberation Front (KPNLF). The KPNLF operated from several refugee camps on the Thai-Cambodian border, where it controlled thousands of civilians. At its peak, the armed branch of the KPNLF were estimated to have between 12,000 and 15,000 fighters, but a third of that number were lost through fighting and desertions during the Vietnamese dry season offensive of 1984–1985. Nonetheless, the KPNLF continued to operate in small groups, harassing the Vietnamese and their Kampuchean allies using guerrilla tactics.

The other non-communist organisation was the National United Front for an Independent, Peaceful, Neutral, and Cooperative Cambodia, formed by Sihanouk and known by its French acronym FUNCINPEC. The organization was formed after Sihanouk had severed ties with the Khmer Rouge following his representation on its behalf at the UN Security Council. As the leader of FUNCINPEC, Sihanouk called on the UN General Assembly to expel Khmer Rouge representatives for their crimes while in power and to keep Kampuchea's seat at the UN vacant on the basis that neither the Khmer Rouge nor the Vietnamese-installed PRK had the mandate to represent the Kampuchean people.

He also criticised ASEAN for its continued recognition of the Khmer Rouge, and specifically Thailand for enabling Chinese arms shipments to travel through its territory to supply the notorious communist group. The KPNLF and the FUNCINPEC were plagued by internal divisions caused by the lack of unity, leadership struggles, corruption and alleged abuses of human rights.

In the early days of the Vietnamese occupation, Kampuchean resistance groups had limited contact with each other due to their differences. Even though the Khmer Rouge enjoyed widespread international recognition, by 1980 the organization was under pressure from the international community to reform itself. ASEAN, which had backed the Khmer Rouge throughout their diplomatic confrontations with the PRK government at the UN General Assembly in 1979, urged the Khmer Rouge leadership to put its blood-stained image behind it to join forces with other non-communist movements. The idea of forming an alliance with the Khmer Rouge initially caused a certain degree of uneasiness within the leadership circles of the FUNCINPEC and the KPNLF, because both groups were leery about joining with a communist organization well known for its brutality. Nonetheless, early in 1981, Sihanouk and Son Sann began engaging in talks with Khieu Samphan, President of the deposed Democratic Kampuchea, to discuss the prospect of forming an alliance.

In August 1981, unity talks between the three organizations appeared to have collapsed as a result of conflicting interests. Sihanouk, who feared the resurgence of the Khmer Rouge, proposed that all resistance groups disarm themselves following the withdrawal of Vietnamese troops from Kampuchea. Meanwhile, Son Sann demanded that the KPNLF be the lead organization within the proposed alliance, and the leaders of the Khmer Rouge "most compromised" by the atrocities in Kampuchea be exiled to China. Against these preconditions, Khieu Samphan reminded his rivals that the autonomy of the Khmer Rouge and Democratic Kampuchea should not be undermined.

On 22 November 1981, Singapore, with the backing of ASEAN, proposed that three organizations form a coalition government with equal decision-making powers within the alliance. Singapore's proposal was welcomed by Sihanouk, who believed it was a fair deal for the non-communist movements. Khieu Samphan, on the other hand, rejected that idea, viewing it as an attempt by Sihanouk and Son Sann to isolate the Khmer Rouge. However, Sihanouk knew that Chinese support would not be made available to the FUNCINPEC unless he made some compromises and joined the Khmer Rouge on their terms. With the need for broader unity against Vietnam, a unity that an explicit communist line would hamper, in December 1981, the Khmer Rouge established the Party of Democratic Kampuchea to replace the Communist Party of Kampuchea and officially abandoned Marxism-Leninism for democratic socialism.

As a result, in February 1982, Sihanouk met with Khieu Samphan in Beijing to work out their differences. In what he described as "another concession", Khieu Samphan proposed forming a coalition government without integrating the other resistance groups into institutions associated with Democratic Kampuchea. However, he emphasized that all parties must defend the legal status of Democratic Kampuchea as the legitimate state representing Kampuchea on the world stage. In May 1982, with the urging of Sihanouk, Son Sann decided to form a coalition government with the Khmer Rouge.

On 22 June 1982, leaders of the three organizations formalised the formation of their coalition government by signing a Thai-sponsored agreement which established the Coalition Government of Democratic Kampuchea (CGDK). Accordingly, the CGDK's Inner Cabinet consisted of Sihanouk as the president of Democratic Kampuchea, Khieu Samphan as the vice-president in charge of foreign affairs and Son Sann as prime minister. Below the Inner Cabinet were six separate committees responsible for national defence, economy and finance, social affairs and public health, military affairs and the media.

During a meeting between Kim Il Sung and Sihanouk on 10 April 1986, in Pyongyang, Kim Il Sung reassured Sihanouk that North Korea would continue to regard him as the legitimate head of state of Kampuchea. By 1987, Democratic Kampuchea still held its membership at the UN General Assembly, even though it lacked four criteria of statehood: people, territory, government, and supreme authority within the borders of a country. In spite of those limitations, forces of the three armed factions within the CGDK continued to fight the Vietnamese to achieve their objective of "bring[ing] about the implementation of the International Conference on Cambodia and other relevant UN General Assembly resolutions".

=== Vietnamese reform and withdrawal ===
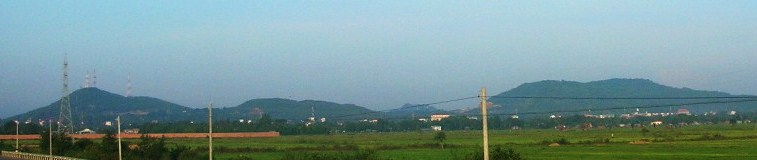
Mountains along the Cambodian–Thai Border north of the road between Serei Saophoan and Aranyaprathet. These were one of the areas where Khmer Rouge fighters hid at the time of the K5 Plan.

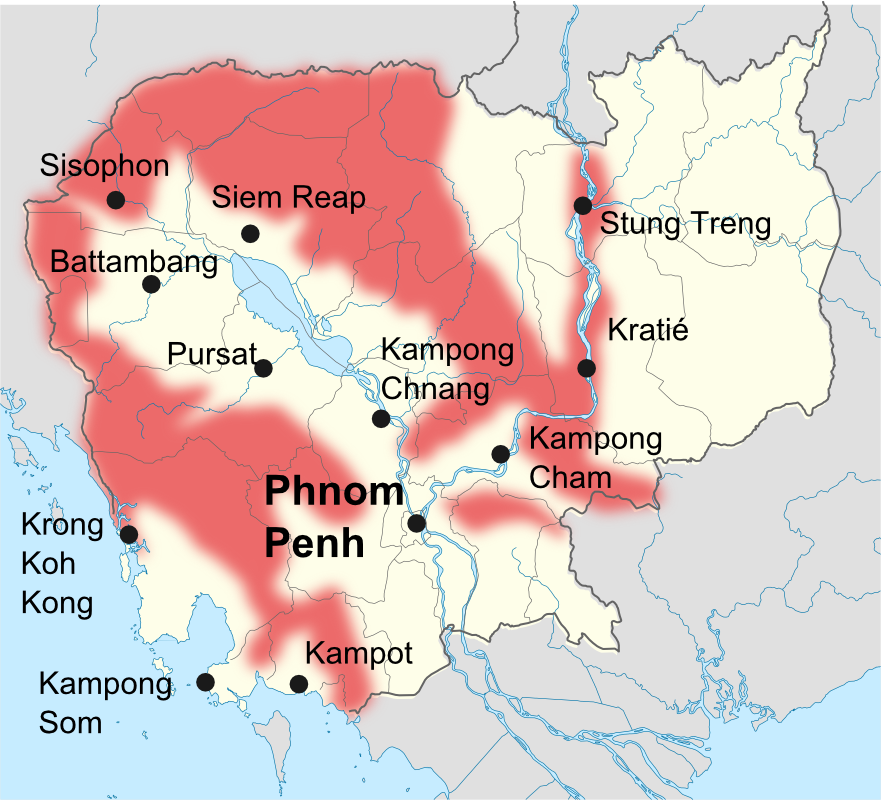
Map of Khmer Rouge activities (1989–1990)

When the Vietnamese leaders launched their invasion of Kampuchea to remove the Khmer Rouge government in 1978, they did not expect a negative reaction from the international community. However, the events that followed the invasion showed that they had severely miscalculated international sympathies toward their cause. Instead of backing Vietnam, most United Nations member countries, including their fellow communist states in Asia like China and North Korea, denounced the Vietnamese use of force against Kampuchea, and even moved to revive the battered Khmer Rouge organisation that had once governed the country with such brutality.

Thus, Kampuchea became more than just a military problem for Vietnam, quickly evolving into an economic and diplomatic problem in the international arena. Throughout the decade in which Vietnam occupied neighbouring Kampuchea, the Vietnamese Government, and the PRK government which it installed, were placed on the periphery of the international community.

The international community's political stance towards Kampuchea had a severe impact on the Vietnamese economy, which was already wrecked by decades of continuous conflicts. The United States, which already had sanctions in place against Vietnam, convinced other countries of the United Nations to deprive Vietnam and the People's Republic of Kampuchea of much-needed funds by denying them membership to major international organisations such as the World Bank, the Asian Development Bank and the International Monetary Fund.

In 1979, Japan stepped up the pressure by suspending all economic aid to Vietnam, and warned Vietnamese leaders that economic aid would only resume when Vietnam amended its policies towards Kampuchea, the Sino-Soviet rivalry and the problem of the boat people. Sweden, which was considered the staunchest supporter of Vietnam in the West, also considered reducing its commitments to the communist country as virtually every other country cancelled its aid.

In addition to external pressure, domestic policies implemented by the Vietnamese Government since 1975 had proven to be largely ineffective in stimulating the country's economic growth. By building on the Soviet model of central economic planning, Vietnam placed most emphasis on the development of heavy industries, while production in agriculture and light manufacturing sectors stagnated. Furthermore, attempts to nationalise the economy of southern Vietnam after reunification only resulted in chaos, as economic output was driven down by dislocation of the general population. In addition to those failed economic policies, Vietnam maintained the fifth-largest armed forces in the world, with 1.26 million regular soldiers under arms, 180,000 of whom were stationed in Cambodia in 1984. Consequently, the Vietnamese Government had to spend one-third of its budget on the military and the campaign in Kampuchea, despite receiving US$1.2 billion in military aid annually from the Soviet Union, thus further hampering Vietnam's economic rebuilding efforts.

In response to international pressure, and to avoid engaging in a debilitating conflict with various local armed resistance groups, Vietnam began withdrawing its military forces from Kampuchea as early as 1982. But the withdrawal process lacked international verification, so foreign observers simply dismissed Vietnam's movement of troops as mere rotations. In 1984, to disengage from Kampuchea, Vietnam unveiled a five-phase strategy known as the K5 Plan. The plan was authored by General Le Duc Anh, who had led the Vietnamese campaign in Kampuchea.

The first phase required the Vietnamese military to capture the bases of armed groups in western Kampuchea and along the border with Thailand. The following phases included sealing off the border with Thailand, destroying local resistance groups, providing security for the population, and building up the Kampuchean People's Revolutionary Armed Forces. Foreign observers believed that the Vietnamese Army completed the first phase of the K5 Plan during the dry season offensive of 1984–85, when the base camps of several anti-Vietnamese resistance groups were overrun. Afterwards, the majority of ten Vietnamese divisions were assigned to operations on the frontiers, with the remainder staying in major provinces to protect the local population and to train the Kampuchean armed forces.

By 1985, international isolation and economic hardships had forced Vietnam to rely more and more on the Soviet Union for help. During the Chinese invasion in February 1979, the Soviet Union provided US$1.4 billion worth of military aid to Vietnam, a figure that peaked at US$1.7 billion in the period between 1981 and 1985. Then, to help Vietnam implement its third Five Year Plan (1981–1985), the Soviet Union provided a sum of US$5.4 billion to the Vietnamese Government for its expenditures; economic aid ultimately reached US$1.8 billion annually. The Soviet Union also provided 90% of Vietnam's demand for raw materials and 70% of its grain imports.

Even though the figures suggest the Soviet Union was a reliable ally, privately Soviet leaders were dissatisfied with Hanoi's handling of the stalemate in Kampuchea and resented the burden of their aid program to Vietnam as their own country was undergoing economic reforms. In 1986, the Soviet Government under Mikhail Gorbachev announced that it would reduce aid to friendly nations; for Vietnam, those reductions meant the loss of 20% of its economic aid and one-third of its military aid.

Ten years of the Vietnamese occupation of Kampuchea officially ended on 26 September 1989, when the last remaining contingent of Vietnamese troops were pulled out. The departing Vietnamese soldiers received much publicity and fanfare as they moved through Phnom Penh, the capital of Kampuchea.

To reengage with the international community, and to deal with the economic challenges brought by the changes in the Soviet Union and Eastern Europe, Vietnamese leaders decided to embark on a series of reforms. At the 6th National Party Congress in December 1986, newly appointed General Secretary of the CPV Nguyen Van Linh introduced a major reform known as Đổi Mới, the Vietnamese term for "renovation", to fix Vietnam's economic problems. However, Vietnamese leaders concluded that Vietnam's dire economic situation came as a result of the international isolation which followed its invasion of Kampuchea in 1978, and that for Đổi Mới to be successful it needed radical changes in defence and foreign policy.

Subsequently, in June 1987, the Vietnamese Politburo adopted a new defence strategy in Resolution No. 2, calling for the complete withdrawal of Vietnamese soldiers from international duties, a reduction in the size of the army through a discharge of 600,000 soldiers and the establishment of a set ratio for military expenditures.

Then, on 13 May 1988, the Vietnamese Politburo adopted Resolution No. 13 on foreign policy, which aimed to achieve diversification and multilateralisation of Vietnam's foreign relations. Its main objectives were to end the embargoes imposed by UN members, integrate Vietnam with the regional and international community, and ultimately attract foreign investment and development aid. As part of this change, Vietnam ceased to regard the United States as a long-term foe and China as an imminent and dangerous enemy. In addition, official Vietnamese propaganda stopped labeling ASEAN as a "NATO-type" organisation.

To implement the new reforms, Vietnam, with support from the Soviet Union, started transferring several years' worth of military equipment to the KPRAF, which numbered more than 70,000 soldiers. The Vietnamese Ministry of Defense's International Relations Department then advised its Kampuchean counterparts to only use the available equipment to maintain their current level of operations, and not to engage in major operations which could exhaust those supplies.

In 1988, Vietnam was estimated to have about 100,000 troops in Kampuchea, but, sensing that a diplomatic settlement was within reach, the Vietnamese Government began withdrawing forces in earnest. Between April and July 1989, 24,000 Vietnamese soldiers returned home. Then, between 21 and 26 September 1989, after suffering 15,000 soldiers killed and another 30,000 wounded during the 10-year occupation, Vietnam's commitment to Kampuchea was officially over when the remaining 26,000 Vietnamese soldiers were pulled out. The withdrawal of Vietnamese troops offered Cambodia the opportunity to mediate its internal affairs through the participation of local stakeholders, including permanent members of the Security Council, to later achieve the Paris Peace Agreement.

However, armed resistance groups opposed to the Vietnamese-installed PRK government claimed that Vietnamese troops were still operating on Kampuchean soil long after September 1989. For example, non-communist groups engaging in land-grab operations in western Kampuchea after the withdrawal reported clashes with elite Vietnamese Special Forces near Tamar Puok along Route 69. Then, in March 1991, Vietnamese units were reported to have re-entered Kampot Province to defeat a Khmer Rouge offensive. Despite such claims, on 23 October 1991, the Vietnamese Government signed the Paris Peace Agreement, which aimed to restore peace in Kampuchea.

== Aftermath ==
=== Battle of Pailin ===
The Vietnamese army withdrew completely after a long period of bogging down without being able to help the native government completely defeat the remnants of the Khmer Rouge. While the Vietnamese were about to end their 10-year occupation of Cambodia, the Khmer Rouge attacked Pailin on 17 September 1989. While they shelled a deserted town, the new transitional government of the State of Cambodia organized what the Chicago Tribune described as a "hero's farewell for the Vietnamese troops on their way out of the country".

According to Khieu Kanharith, the Khmer Rouge guerillas committed two divisions to the Pailin campaign, the 320th and the 412th divisions. The government army led by General Ke Kim Yan was outnumbered with only one troop division, or about 6,000 men involved in the defense of Pailin. The departure of the Vietnamese had created high expectations but in the end it brought no denouement to the conflict. On 24 October 1989, nearly one month after the Vietnamese withdrew, the Khmer Rouge claimed victory over the city of Pailin capturing tanks and artillery in what was perceived by the Chicago Tribune as "a major victory for the Khmer Rouge in its 11-year battle to topple the Vietnamese-installed government of Cambodia."

From then until August 1996, the Khmer Rouge kept three main headquarters in Pailin, Anlong Veng and Phnom Malai.

=== Paris Peace Agreement ===
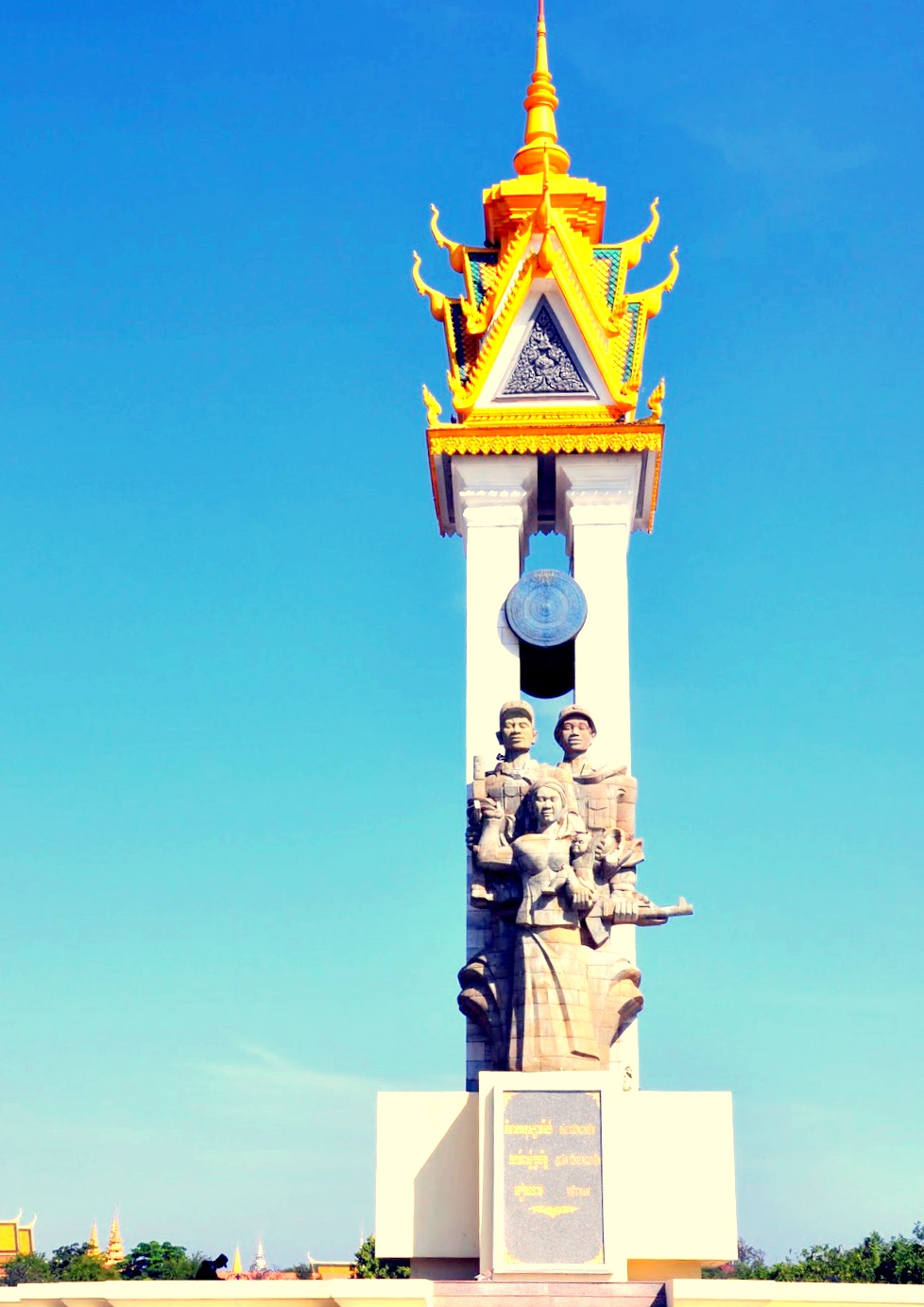
The Cambodia–Vietnam Friendship Monument in Phnom Penh was constructed to commemorate the ousting of the Khmer Rouge government on 7 January 1979, by Vietnamese and KUFNS forces.

On 14 January 1985, Hun Sen was appointed Prime Minister of the People's Republic of Kampuchea and began peace talks with the factions of the Coalition Government of Democratic Kampuchea. Between 2 and 4 December 1987, Hun Sen met with Sihanouk at Fère-en-Tardenois in France to discuss the future of Kampuchea. Further talks occurred between 20 and 21 January 1988, and Hun Sen offered Sihanouk a position within the Kampuchean Government on the condition that he returned to Kampuchea straight away. However, Sihanouk did not accept the offer, even as preparations were made in Phnom Penh to receive him.

Despite that failure, Hun Sen's Kampuchean Government was able to persuade Cheng Heng and In Tam, both ministers in Lon Nol's government, to return to Kampuchea. In the first major step towards restoring peace in Kampuchea, representatives of the CGDK and the PRK met for the first time at the First Jakarta Informal Meeting on 25 July 1988. In that meeting, Sihanouk proposed a three-stage plan, which called for a cease-fire, a UN peacekeeping force to supervise the withdrawal of Vietnamese troops and the integration of all Kampuchean armed factions into a single army.

Vietnamese foreign minister Nguyen Co Thach urged all parties involved to separate Kampuchean problems into internal and external aspects. Therefore, to begin the process of restoring peace, the Vietnamese delegation proposed a two-stage plan that began with internal discussions among the Kampuchean factions, followed by a roundtable discussion with all involved countries. The Vietnamese proposal won out at the meeting, but no agreements were reached.

At the Second Jakarta Meeting, on 19 February 1989, Australian foreign minister Gareth Evans forwarded the Cambodian Peace Plan to bring about a ceasefire, a peacekeeping force and the establishment of a national unity government to maintain Kampuchea's sovereignty until elections were held. To facilitate a peace agreement on the eve of the Vietnamese withdrawal, between 29 and 30 April 1989, Hun Sen convened a meeting of the National Assembly to adopt a new constitution, and the country was renamed the State of Cambodia to reflect the state of ambiguity of the country's sovereignty. Furthermore, Buddhism was re-established as the state religion, and citizens were guaranteed the right to hold private property.

In the meantime, however, peace talks between the warring factions continued, with the First Paris Peace Conference on Cambodia held in Paris in 1989. On 26 February 1990, following the withdrawal of Vietnamese troops, the Third Jakarta Informal Meeting was held, at which the Supreme National Council was established to safeguard Cambodian sovereignty. Initially, the Supreme National Council was to have 12 members, with three seats allocated to each faction of the CGDK, and three to the pro-Vietnam Kampuchean People's Revolutionary Party.

However, Hun Sen objected to the proposed arrangement, calling instead for each faction of the CGDK to be given two seats for a total of six, and the Kampuchean People's Revolutionary Party to have six seats. In 1991 the Supreme National Council began representing Cambodia at the UN General Assembly. Then, in a bold move, Hun Sen renamed the Kampuchean People's Revolutionary Party as the Cambodian People's Party in an effort to portray his party as a democratic institution and renounce its revolutionary struggle.

On 23 October 1991, the Cambodian factions of the Supreme National Council, along with Vietnam and 15 member nations of the International Peace Conference on Cambodia, signed the Paris Peace Agreement. For the Cambodian people, two decades of continuous warfare and 13 years of civil war seemed to be over, although an atmosphere of uneasiness amongst the leaders of the Cambodian factions remained. To include the Khmer Rouge in the agreement, the major powers agreed to avoid using the word "genocide" to describe the actions of the Government of Democratic Kampuchea in the period between 1975 and 1979.

As a result, Hun Sen criticised the Paris Agreement as being far from perfect, as it failed to remind the Cambodian people of the atrocities committed by the Khmer Rouge government. Nonetheless, the Paris Agreement established the United Nations Transitional Authority in Cambodia (UNTAC), in accordance with the UN Security Council's Resolution 745, and gave UNTAC a broad mandate to supervise main policies and administration works until a Cambodian government was democratically elected.

On 14 November 1991, Sihanouk returned to Cambodia to participate in the elections, followed by Son Sen, a Khmer Rouge official, who arrived a few days later to set up the organisation's electoral campaign office in Phnom Penh. On 27 November 1991, Khieu Samphan also returned to Cambodia on a flight from Bangkok. He had expected his arrival to be uneventful, but as soon as Khieu Samphan's flight landed at Pochentong Airport, he was met by an angry crowd which shouted insults and abuse at him. As Khieu Samphan was driven into the city, another crowd lined the route towards his office and threw objects at his car.

As soon as he arrived at his office, Khieu Samphan entered and immediately telephoned the Chinese Government to save him. Shortly afterwards, an angry mob forced its way into the building, chased Khieu Samphan up the second floor and tried to hang him from a ceiling fan. Eventually, Khieu Samphan was able to escape from the building by a ladder with his face bloodied, and was immediately taken to Pochentong Airport, where he flew out of Cambodia. With the departure of Khieu Samphan, the Khmer Rouge's participation in the election seemed doubtful.

In March 1992, the start of the UNTAC mission in Cambodia was marked by the arrival of 22,000 UN peacekeepers, which included troops from 22 countries, 6,000 officials, 3,500 police and 1,700 civilian employees and electoral volunteers. The mission was led by Yasushi Akashi. In June 1992, the Khmer Rouge formally established the National Union Party of Kampuchea, and announced that it would not register to participate in the upcoming elections. Furthermore, the Khmer Rouge also refused to disarm its forces in accordance with the Paris agreement.

To prevent ethnic Vietnamese from taking part in the elections, the Khmer Rouge started massacring Vietnamese civilian communities, causing hundreds of thousands of Vietnamese to flee Cambodia. Towards the end of 1992, Khmer Rouge forces advanced into Kampong Thom to gain a strategic foothold, before UN peacekeeping forces were fully deployed there. In the months leading up to the elections, several UN military patrols were attacked as they entered Khmer Rouge-held territory.

Despite ongoing threats from the Khmer Rouge during the elections, on 28 May 1993, FUNCINPEC won 45.47 percent of the vote, against 38.23 percent for the Cambodian People's Party. Though clearly defeated, Hun Sen refused to accept the results of the election, so his Defense Minister, Sin Song, announced the secession of the eastern provinces of Cambodia, which had supported the Cambodian People's Party. Prince Norodom Ranariddh, leader of FUNCINPEC and son of Sihanouk, agreed to form a coalition government with the Cambodian People's Party so Cambodia would not break up. On 21 September 1993, the Cambodian Constituent Assembly approved a new Constitution and Ranariddh became First Prime Minister. He appointed Hun Sen as the Second Prime Minister.

On 23 September 1993, the constitutional monarchy was restored with Norodom Sihanouk as the head of state. In July 1994, the Cambodian Government outlawed the Khmer Rouge for its continuous violations of the Paris Agreement. Most significantly, the Cambodian Government also specifically recognised the genocide and atrocities which occurred under Democratic Kampuchea. By 1998, the Khmer Rouge basically collapsed. The last Khmer Rouge guerrillas surrendered to the Cambodian government on 9 February 1999, ending the remnants of communism in Cambodia. As a result, the government incorporated the last remnants of the Khmer Rouge into Cambodian army on February 12.

=== Vietnam rejoins the world ===
The military occupation of Kampuchea had profound consequences for Vietnamese foreign policy. Since taking power in North Vietnam in 1954, the Vietnamese communist perspective on foreign policy had been dominated by the need to maintain a world order of two camps, communist and non-communist. Indeed, the treaties of friendship that Vietnam signed with the Soviet Union, Laos and the People's Republic of Kampuchea were consistent with that view. Despite being the only country willing to put an end to the Khmer Rouge's genocide, Vietnam found itself vilified by most Western countries.

In the years that followed, the Vietnamese Government was left isolated from the world and its efforts to rebuild the country were hindered by the lack of aid from the capitalist Western nations. Furthermore, the presence of Vietnamese military forces in Cambodia became an obstacle which prevented the normalisation of diplomatic ties with China, the United States and the member nations of ASEAN.

In light of the decline experienced by the Soviet Union and the socialist countries of Eastern Europe, the Vietnamese Government began repairing diplomatic relations with neighbouring countries as part of a greater effort to rejuvenate Vietnam's shattered economy. Since its invasion in 1979, China had placed sustained pressure on the northern borders of Vietnam, with the province of Ha Tuyen regularly shelled by Chinese artillery. In September 1985, Chinese bombardment of Ha Tuyen reached a peak when 2,000 rounds were fired.

To reduce the state of hostility along the border region, and ultimately normalise relations with China, the Vietnamese Government dropped all hostile references to China at the 6th National Party Congress in December 1986, and also adopted the Đổi Mới policy. In August 1990, as the Cambodian Peace Plan, authored by Australian foreign minister Gareth Evans, was being endorsed by the UN Security Council, both China and Vietnam moved towards accommodation.

Early in September 1990, Vietnamese prime minister Đỗ Mười, General Secretary Nguyen Van Linh and former prime minister Pham Van Dong travelled to Chengdu, China, where they held a secret meeting with Chinese prime minister Li Peng and General Secretary of the Chinese Communist Party Jiang Zemin. On 17 September 1990, General Võ Nguyên Giáp also made a trip to China and thanked the Chinese Government for its past assistance. Despite outward signs of improvement in Vietnam's diplomatic relations with China, Vietnamese leaders were reluctant to endorse any peace plan which could weaken their client government in Phnom Penh.

However, as the four Cambodian factions reached an agreement on the power-sharing arrangement outlined at the Third Jakarta Informal Meeting in February 1990, Vietnam and China rapidly moved to re-establish formal diplomatic relations. In November 1991, newly elected Vietnamese prime minister Võ Văn Kiệt travelled to Beijing and met his Chinese counterpart, Li Peng, and they issued an 11-point communiqué re-establishing diplomatic ties between the two countries after 10 years without formal relations.

The end of the Cambodian conflict also brought an end to the ASEAN-imposed trade and aid embargo which had been in place since 1979. In January 1990, Thai Prime Minister Chatichai Choonhavan publicly voiced his support for Vietnam, and the rest of Indochina, to gain admission into ASEAN. In the period between late 1991 and early 1992, Vietnam restored relations with several member nations of ASEAN. As a result, between 1991 and 1994, investments from ASEAN countries made up 15 percent of direct foreign investment in Vietnam.

Aside from the obvious economic benefits, ASEAN also provided a peaceful environment that guaranteed Vietnam's national security against foreign threats in the post-Cold War era, when Soviet aid was no longer available. Thus, on 28 July 1995, Vietnam officially became the seventh member of ASEAN, after leading ASEAN officials invited Vietnam to join at the ASEAN Ministerial Meeting in Bangkok in 1994. Then, in August 1995, the U.S. Liaison Office in Hanoi was upgraded to Embassy status, after U.S. president Bill Clinton announced a formal normalisation of diplomatic relations with Vietnam on 11 July 1995, thereby ending Vietnam's isolation from the United States.

=== Environmental impacts ===
Cambodia and Vietnam's forest cover underwent drastic reductions following the end of the Khmer Rouge government. The fall of Khmer Rouge was attributed to Vietnamese troops overthrowing the government and the occupation of Phnom Penh, establishing the People's Republic of Kampuchea (PRK) in 1978. With lack of international support by the end of the Cold War, the Khmer Rouge struggled to rebuild itself. In an attempt to increase revenue and regain power, they established themselves along the Thailand–Cambodia border in northwestern Cambodia to focus on exploiting Cambodia's natural resources including timber and rubies. With 15% of total global tropical forests, Southeast Asia is a leader in timber production. This initiative quickly became a race between political factions, as the PRK adopted Khmer Rouge extraction efforts.

From 1969 to 1995, Cambodia's forest cover shrank from 73% to 30–35%. Similarly, Vietnam lost nearly three million hectares of forest cover from 1976 to 1995. In 1992, Khmer Rouge became internationally isolated. The United Nations Security Council banned all exports of Cambodian timber in November of that year. Efforts to create a neutral electoral environment led to the establishment of the United Nations Transitional Authority (UNTAC) in Cambodia. The move was implemented in January 1993. In the same year, the Vietnamese issued a logging ban, driving the Khmer Rouge to logging illegally. Illicit exports from Cambodia to Vietnam was worth US$130 million each year.

Thailand was the largest violator of UNTAC. The Thai government at the time insisted that Cambodian imported timber must have a certificate of origin approved by the governmental authorities in Phnom Penh. These certificates cost US$35 for each cubic metre of timber from Khmer Rouge operating areas. This forced the Khmer Rouge to increase prices. They learned to speak Thai and sold timber illegally to Thai timber operators, earning them over US$10 million monthly.

Global Witness, an international human rights and environmental non-governmental organization (NGO) based in London, recognized these timber guerrillas when they identified mass Cambodian exports. They subsequently lobbied for an amendment to the US Foreign Operations Act. The act was passed. It stated that US assistance would no longer be given to any country cooperating militarily with the Khmer Rouge. Thailand closed its borders with Cambodia the next day.

Japan was the second largest offender of UNTAC, purchasing 8,000 cubic metres of timber from Cambodia. There were 46 other identified offenders including the Koreas, Singapore, and Taiwan. After timber is produced by Cambodia or the greater Southeast Asia region, these "offender" countries re-process the logs which are subsequently transferred to North America, the Middle East, and Africa for sale.

PRK eventually offered the Khmer Rouge re-integration into Cambodia's national armed forces as well as reconciliation between the two parties. In August 1996, the regional command of Khmer Rouge travelled back to Phnom Penh. Pol Pot, the former prime minister of the Democratic Kampuchea, and his lieutenants stayed in the northern region to continue attempts at generating revenue from the extraction of natural resources. However, the group became irrelevant due to a lack of support. By 1998, Khmer Rouge had dissolved completely.

In 2010, the Royal Government of Cambodia set out a forest management plan called the National Forest Programme (NFP) to manage Cambodia's forest industry effectively in the long-term. A number of donors had been in support of the United Nations Programme on Reducing emissions from deforestation and forest degradation (UN-REDD). UN-REDD itself contributed over US$3 million. The project has also been financed by the United Nations Development Programme through Target for Resource Assignment from the Core (UNDP-TRAC) with US$500,000, the United Nations Development Programme through Sustainable Forest Management (UNDP-SFM) with US$250,000, the United Nations Development Programme through Conservation Areas through Landscape Management (UNDP-CALM) with US$150,000, and the Food and Agriculture Organization (FAO) with US$300,000.

The Department of Forestry and Wildlife and the Cambodia Tree Seed Project was in collaborative support of developing the Royal Government of Cambodia's NFP. NFP's objective is to contribute optimally to poverty alleviation and macro-economic growth through sustainable forest management and conservation with active stakeholder participation, particularly in rural areas.

=== Political consequences ===
Cambodian people continue to have diverse opinions of the outcome of the war. Some Cambodians have perceived Vietnam as their savior for fighting and toppling the brutal Khmer Rouge government, and for helping Cambodia even while being sanctioned. On the other hand, Cambodian hardliners have perceived the war as a Vietnamese imperialist conquest; this view has, since 2010, developed into the rampant rise of Cambodian nationalism and anti-Vietnamese sentiment, which led to the killing of some Vietnamese nationals in Cambodia.

The rampant rise of anti-Vietnamese sentiment in Cambodia was fostered by historical grievances that existed before the 1978 war. For Cambodian nationalists, the trauma of previous Vietnamese incursions and occupation since the 17th century gave impetus to their increasing hostility against the Vietnamese. On the other hand, and ironically, China, the previous backer of the Khmer Rouge, was venerated as a new ally, which strengthened Cambodia–China relations in response to fears of possible Vietnamese intervention.

On the Vietnamese side, both the communist government and anti-communists regarded the war as a righteous liberation of Cambodia from genocide, though some objected due to the previous alliance between the Khmer Rouge and the Vietcong, and has shown its distrust toward Cambodians over the growing Cambodian–Chinese relationship.

The reaction to the war in Cambodia also varied across the world. While strong opposition to the Vietnamese occupation in the 1980s resulted in sanctions against Vietnam, since 2000, views sympathetic to Vietnam's cause have increased dramatically in number. This has been attributed to growing Vietnamese relations with the Western world and its good reputation abroad, including among former adversaries (except China and a number of Cambodian nationalist groups), with more acknowledgement of Vietnam's goodwill towards Cambodians, though not without controversies and opposition.

Vietnam's relations with fellow communist countries China and North Korea were also severely hurt due to Beijing and Pyongyang's support for the Khmer Rouge. As both nations have never acknowledged their support for Pol Pot, relations between Vietnam and the two nations have always been difficult in spite of the end of the war. During the time of the Vietnamese invasion, North Korea had supported China invading Vietnam in 1979, as well as openly endorsed China's territorial claims in the South China Sea against Vietnam. Since the end of the war in Cambodia, Vietnam has refused to support North Korea against South Korea, and has remained deeply resentful of North Korean support for the Khmer Rouge. It was not until 2007 that a Vietnamese president, Nông Đức Mạnh, finally paid a visit to North Korea, the first high-ranking visit since 1957, which was followed later by Kim Jong Un's visit to Vietnam during the 2019 Trump–Kim Summit, with the aim to repair the previously damaged relations. Nonetheless, Vietnam has openly opposed North Korea's missile tests, which were rumoured to be a testament to the old hostility, and also consistently voiced support for the denuclearization of the Korean Peninsula, usually under joint statements with the South Korean government and is a stance that North Korea generally opposes.

== See also ==
- Allegations of United States support for the Khmer Rouge
- Ba Chúc massacre
- Khmer Krom
- Nong Chan Refugee Camp
- Nong Samet Refugee Camp
- Sino-Vietnamese War
- Nam tiến
- Vietnamese border raids in Thailand
- Vietnamese invasions of Cambodia
- Vietnam–Cambodia relations
