= Racism in Vietnam =

Racism in Vietnam (Vietnamese: phân biệt chủng tộc ở Việt Nam) has been mainly directed by the majority and dominant ethnic Vietnamese Kinh against ethnic minorities such as the Montagnards, Chams, and the Khmer Krom.

== History ==
=== Race issues and Khmer–Vietnamese racial violence during the First Indochina War ===
Historian Shawn McHale notes that while race shaped French attitudes towards Vietnamese, almost nothing has been written on Vietnamese notions of race in the First Indochina War. In reality, some Vietnamese writers and intellectuals were heavily influenced by social Darwinism before the Second World War, shaping their discourse on race. During the First Indochina War, while antagonists generally avoided race-talk, some did not. They increasingly employed a discourse of race and ethnicity that, at times, demonized Black, Arab, Khmer, and (non-Vietnamese) indigenous Other. For instance, a nationalist propaganda leaflet in the Mekong Delta in 1951 claiming how the "barbaric French" were using machines to "cook" Vietnamese soldiers and turn them into black Africans and Moroccans.

War propaganda aside, some of this racial denigration could be found in mainstream Vietnamese media, a vicious anti-black and xenophobic hatred. Racially charged rhetorical expressions could be found in popular slogans, newspapers, and graphic imagery such as propaganda posters and cartoons. At the same time, Vietnamese across the political spectrum emphasized the need "to protect the Vietnamese race (nòi giống)". The Vietnamese construct of race at the time was the one who shared "biological bloodline" or having the common Vietnamese descent. The term đồng bào (compatriots) also accentuates the same meanings, and was later extended to the Chinese in Mekong Delta who had often intermarried with the Vietnamese, but was never applied to peoples of Cham, Malay, and Khmer ethnicities. The high percentages of Black Africans and Arabs in the French Expeditionary Corps were likely reasons for Vietnamese deep animosity toward blackness. Such intense antagonisms received little condemnation from the Viet Minh leaders who at the same time also realized that those Black and Arab soldiers were also victims of the French colonial empire.

Examples of this racial discourse across time are not hard to find. For example, Đào Duy Anh once stated in the 1940s: "the culture of the American and European peoples is high, while the culture of the savage peoples (dân tộc mọi rợ) of Africa and Australia, just like that of the Mường, Mán, Mọi in our country, is deficient." A Dân sinh newspaper declared on January 14, 1946, "Now, no one would dare claim that the Vietnamese nation is a tribe of savages (một bộ tộc mọi rợ), since the Vietnamese people have exercised self-determination and self-rule through elections!" Hanoi journalist Phùng Tri Lai in 1950 vigorously characterized African minorities in terms of their so-called "nudity, barbaric habits, and custom of eating human flesh." When Catholic members in the Viet Minh resistance appealed to fellow Catholic in the Mekong Delta in 1949, they invoked the fear of racial extinction: "You cannot fold your arms and watch the enemy wipe out the race." On the opposite view, Khmer Krom monk Trịnh Thới Cang in 1949 argued that, without education, the Cambodian minority of Vietnam would be practically viewed as no more than the Blacks of America in the perception of Vietnamese intellectuals. It was common, during the war, for ethnic minorities in Vietnam who were deemed "darker-skinned" to be considered culturally inferior to the Vietnamese.

Racial discourse was linked, at times, to repression of ethnic minorities. Even before the beginning of the war, Vietnamese ethnic violence and repression conducted by various factions against the Khmer Krom of the Mekong Delta had already accelerated, all part of a dynamic of violence that shaped the Mekong delta. Trần Văn Trà in early 1946 admitted that the Party "used force to repress, and arrested hundreds of Khmer." These resulted in an outbreak of ethnic tensions, mass murders, chaotic pillaging of towns, and race riots committed by both Khmer and Viet populaces erupted and spread throughout the Delta from August 1945 to March 1946.

McHale concludes that racial violence and race issues during the First Indochina War, which are often seen as marginal, outside the mainstream scholarship, were significant: "..., the First Indochina War was a race war. But it was not like World War II, in which Japanese propagandists spoke of a "Yamato race" fighting whites in a bitter global struggle, or Nazis defined Germans as a pure Aryan "race" fighting against racial others. Neither was it a Fanonian war pitting white colonialists against a darker foe. Rather, in the worst of times, Vietnamese sometimes perceived the war as a struggle for their own racial or ethnic survival against enemies, who ranged from French rapists and killers to Moroccan and Senegalese cannibals and on to Khmer Krom decapitators."

=== South Vietnam ===
Starting from 1955, the South Vietnamese government of Ngô Đình Diệm carried out an assimilation program against the indigenous peoples of the Central Highlands and the Cham, banning the teaching of Cham language in public schools, discriminating highland groups, while seizing indigenous lands for the Kinh. This resulted in increasing nationalist and independent sentiments among the Cham and the indigenous peoples. Some Cham joined the communist NFL, some other joined FLC and FLHPC Front de Libeùration des Hauts Plateaux du Champa (Liberation of Highlands and Champa). By 1964, civil right activists and independent organizations of the indigenous peoples, including Cham organizations, had been merged into Front Unifieù de Lutte des Races Opprimeùes (FULRO), which fought against the governments of the Republic of Vietnam and succeeding Socialist Republic of Vietnam until late 1980s.

== Chams ==
The Cham in Vietnam are only recognized as a minority, and not as an indigenous people by the Vietnamese government despite being indigenous to central and southern Vietnam. Both Hindu and Muslim Chams have experienced religious and ethnic persecution and restrictions on their faith under the current Vietnamese government, with the Vietnamese state confiscating Cham property and forbidding Cham from observing their religious beliefs.

In 2010 and 2013 several incidents occurred in Thành Tín and Phươc Nhơn villages where Cham were murdered by Vietnamese.

Vietnamese authorities were reported confisticating Cham property and forbidding Cham from observing their religious beliefs also through turning Hindu temples into tourist sites.

In 2012, Vietnamese police in Chau Giang village stormed into a Cham Mosque, stole the electric generator, and also raped Cham girls.

== Highlanders ==
The Kinh Vietnamese dominated government media propagate negative stereotypes of the highlander ethnic minorities, labeling them as "ignorant", "illiterate", "backward" and claim that they are impoverished and underdeveloped because of their own lack of economic and agricultural skills. The ethnic Kinh settlers in the highlands have negative stereotypes and views of the highlanders with barely any intermarriage and little interaction since they deliberately choose to live in different villages with other ethnic Kinh. The Vietnamese government has promoted the ethnic Kinh migration to the highlands as bringing "development" to the highlanders.

=== Montagnards ===
Montagnards are made up of many different tribes that are indigenous to the Central Highlands of Vietnam. In the past, Montagnards were referred to as "mọi" (savages), by the Vietnamese. Vietnamese textbooks used to describe Montagnards as people with long tails and excessive body hair. Nowadays, the non-offensive term "người Thượng" (highlanders), is used instead.

The French, the Communist North Vietnamese, and the anti-Communist South Vietnamese all exploited and persecuted the Montagnards. North Vietnamese Communists forcibly recruited "comfort girls" from the indigenous Montagnard peoples of the Central Highlands and murdered those who didn't comply, inspired by Japan's use of Comfort women.

In 1956, President Ngo Dinh Diem launched programs to resettle the ethnic Kinh and Northern ethnic minorities into the Central Highlands. These programs also sought to assimilate the Montagnards into mainstream Vietnamese society. This was the beginning of the struggle between ethnic Kinh and Montagnards. After the Vietnam War, the communist government further encouraged the ethnic Kinh to resettle in the highlands to cultivate coffee after the demand for coffee in the world boomed. Approximately 1,000,000 ethnic Kinh were forcibly resettled to the Central Highlands. This resettlement caused conflict between the ethnic Kinh and Montagnards because the Montagnards believed the ethnic Kinh were encroaching on their land. This conflict lead to resentment from the Montagnards which lead to some deadly protests against the ethnic Kinh.

Montagnards have faced religious persecution from the communist Vietnamese government since the end of the Vietnam war. The Vietnamese government has a list of government-approved religious organizations and requires that all religious groups register with the government. Any religious groups that are considered to be going against national interests are repressed and shut down. The Vietnamese government claim the independent Montagnard religious groups use religion to incite unrest. They use this to justify their capture, detainment, and interrogation of Montagnard political activists, leaders, and shut down of unregistered Montagnard churches. Followers of unregistered churches and religious activists have also been harassed, arrested, imprisoned, or placed under house arrest by authorities.

In 2001 and 2004, there were major protests from thousands of Montagnards. They protested against the repression and religious persecution from the Vietnamese government and demanded their land back. In 2001, there was a Montagnard independence movement facilitated by MFI members. These protests lead to deaths and mass imprisonments.

== Khmer Krom ==
Some USA-based NGOs report that the human rights of the Khmer Krom are being violated by the Vietnamese government. According to these reports, Khmer Krom are reportedly forced to adopt Vietnamese family names and speak the Vietnamese language. As well, the Vietnamese government has cracked down on non-violent demonstrations by the Khmer Krom.

Unlike some other minority people groups in Vietnam, the Khmer Krom are largely unknown by the Western world, despite efforts by associations of exiled Khmer Krom such as the Khmers Kampuchea-Krom Federation to publicize their plight with the Unrepresented Nations and Peoples Organization. No Western government has yet raised the matter of the Khmer Krom's human rights with the Vietnamese government.

The "Human Rights Council Universal Periodic Review Working Group" was visited by the Khmer Kampuchea Krom Federation.

== See also ==
- Anti-Vietnamese sentiment
- Bụi đời

== Sources ==
- Lafont, Pierre-Bernard (2007). Le Campā: Géographie, population, histoire. Indes savantes. ISBN 978-2-84654-162-6.
- McHale, Shawn F. (2021). The First Vietnam War: Violence, Sovereignty, and the Fracture of the South, 1945–1956. Cambridge University Press. ISBN 9781108936002.
