= Sihanouk National Army =

Paramilitary wing of FUNCINPEC

- កងទ័ពជាតិសីហនុ
- Leaders: Norodom Ranariddh; In Tam; Norodom Chakrapong; Nhek Bun Chhay
- Dates active: 1982 – 1993
- Active regions: Cambodia
- Ideology: Monarchism; Khmer nationalism
- Size: over 10,000 (claimed)
- Part of: FUNCINPEC
- Wars: Cambodian conflict (1979–1998)

The National Army of the Sihanoukists or Sihanouk National Army (Khmer: កងទ័ពជាតិសីហនុ; French: Armee Nationale Sihanoukiste, ANS) were the armed forces of the Cambodian monarchists who supported Norodom Sihanouk. They were the paramilitary wing of the FUNCINPEC party. In the 1980s, it participated in the armed struggle against the Vietnamese occupation and the PRK government. In the Kingdom of Cambodia, it continued to function as the FUNCINPEC party armed wing. It was incorporated into the Royal Cambodian Army.

== Forming a coalition ==
After the Vietnamese intervention and the overthrow of Democratic Kampuchea in January 1979, Cambodia was ruled by the pro-Vietnamese and pro-Soviet regime of the People's Republic of Kampuchea. The Khmer Rouge, led by Pol Pot, retreated to the hard-to-reach areas of the western part of the country. The National Army of Democratic Kampuchea (NDK), which they established, launched a guerrilla war. In October 1979, the National Liberals Son Sann created the KPNLF with its Khmer People's National Liberation Armed Forces (KPNLAF). The third opposition group were the supporters of Prince Norodom Sihanouk, organized in the FUNCINPEC and MOULINAKA parties.

On June 22, 1982, Khieu Samphan, Son Sann and Sihanouk established the Coalition Government of Democratic Kampuchea (CGDK), a bloc of the Democratic Kampuchea Party (Khmer Rouge), KPNLF and FUNCINPEC in the Kuala Lumpur. Soon, a meeting was held between the commanders of the armed groups — Son Sung, Sak Sutsakan and Norodom Ranarita. The latter represented the armed forces of FUNCINPEC and MOULINAKA. They were named the National Sihanoukist Army (the French-language name Armée Nationale Sihanoukiste, ANS was adopted internationally). The Military Coordination Meeting of the CGDK was established.

A narrower military structure was also created — the Joint Military Command (JMC) of the non — communist part of the CGDK-Republicans and Sihanoukists. Sak Soutsakan (KPNLAF) became the Commander — in — Chief, Teap Ben (ANS) became the Deputy, Toan Chai (ANS) became the Chief of the General Staff, and Abdul Ghaffar Peang — Met (KPNLAF) became his deputy.

== Equipment, command, and size ==
Initially, the Sihanoukist units based in the Thai-Kampuchean border area were extremely small, poorly armed and equipped, and faced food shortages. However, the situation changed after the establishment of the CGDK and the establishment of regular supplies from China and ASEAN countries. Nevertheless, the maximum estimated number of ANS members was around 11,000. Sihanouk himself claimed that there were 8,500 members, while estimates typically range from 5,000 to 7,000. This is significantly lower than NADK (35-50 thousand) and KPNLAF (12-15 thousand). The ANS' weapons, like those of other CGDK units, mostly originated from China. The camouflage uniforms were supplied by ASEAN countries. There were no insignia, and the soldiers were identified by images of Sihanouk and royal symbols

The ANS was commanded by Norodom Sihanouk's son Prince Norodom Ranariddh, with his brother Norodom Chakrapong as chief of staff. For a short time, the command was held by former Home Minister In Tam, but due to his prior involvement with Lon Nol, he was not trusted by Sihanouk and was soon removed. The ANS's military weakness compared to the Son Sann and Pol Pot factions limited its activities. However, the massive Vietnamese offensive in 1984 and 1985 caused significant damage to the NAK and KPNLAF. As a result, the ANS became more active and attempted to advance deeper into Cambodian territory. Its forces were not only present in the western province of Battambang but also in the central province of Kampong Thom. During this period, the ANS significantly strengthened and pushed back the KPNLAF. There were direct clashes between the ANS and the NADK.

At the time of the Paris Peace Accords, the ANS was estimated to have 17,500 members, which dropped to 14,000 the following year. This sharp decrease was due to the end of the war and the de facto legalization of FUNCINPEC.

== See also ==
1997 Cambodian coup d'état
