= Anti-Vietnamese sentiment =

Anti-Vietnamese sentiment (Vietnamese: chủ nghĩa bài Việt Nam) involves hostility or hatred that is directed towards Vietnam, Viet people, or the government of Vietnam. This may be due to negative perceptions created by historical tensions, ethnic negative perceptions, wars, or xenophobic sentiments against Vietnamese diasporic communities. National or regional discrimination can also occur.

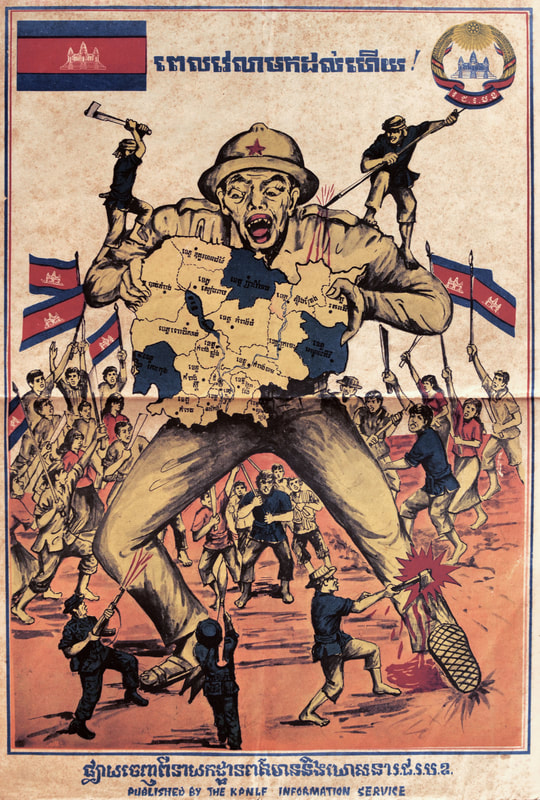
Anti-Vietnamese propaganda from the Khmer People's National Liberation Front.

Additionally, xenophobia towards the Vietnamese may extend from cultural, political, or economic divisions, such as Vietnam being situated within the affected Global South (mostly developing countries) or anti-communists being hostile against Vietnamese communist rule.

Vietnam has a Kinh majority, but is also a multiethnic country.

== Background ==
Anti-Vietnamese sentiment has a strong and deep historical root for hundred years. There are several features behind this anti-Vietnamese hatred below:

- Organized persecution of the Vietnamese as a nation or as an ethnic group, often based on the belief that Vietnamese interests are a threat to one's own national aspirations;
- Racist anti-Vietnamese sentiment, a variety of xenophobia;
- Cultural anti-Vietnamese sentiment: a prejudice against the Vietnamese and Vietnamese-speaking persons – their customs, language, and education; and
- Stereotypes about Vietnam and Vietnamese people in the media and popular culture, including distortions and illusions. Examples include:
  - Being seen as poor boat people, refugees, or illegal migrants doing illegal activity abroad.
  - Western perspectives often frame Vietnam as a wild, "jungle" place lacking a formalized civilization, ignoring that Vietnamese civilization has a long, documented history.

Anti-Vietnamese acts had long been organized by various countries and ethnicities opposing the existence of Vietnam as a country and the irrational fear of a supposed Vietnamese takeover, in both direct and indirect forms. Chinese dynasties used to extend their level of anti-Vietnamese persecutions from imprisoning, hanging to even massacres in large scales, notably under the Ming dynasty which the Chinese organized massacring methods from burning to beheading with no mercy; or the famine of 1944–1945 in which the Empire of Japan was believed to have attempted a brutal extermination of possible Vietnamese resistance against Japanese rule. Smaller states like Cambodia also organized massacres of Vietnamese people, notably under Lon Nol and the Khmer Rouge, justifying that Vietnam wanted to take over Cambodia and make it a province. Historic actions inspired by anti-Vietnamism ranged from felonious acts motivated by hatred to the physical extermination of the Vietnamese nation, the goal of which was to eradicate the Vietnamese state.

Viet Thanh Nguyen argues that Western depictions of Vietnam, particularly through Hollywood and literature, suffer from a "jungle" bias, reducing the Vietnamese to victims or savages in a primitive setting while ignoring their actual civilization, history, and agency. Nguyen argues that American media distorts history by focusing on American trauma rather than Vietnamese experiences, reducing a complex, ancient civilization to a mere backdrop for American self-reflection. However, historian Peter Zinoman criticizes the depiction in Nguyen's novel The Sympathizer for portraying Vietnamese women in demeaning ways, featuring sexual violence, and offering other unduly negative portrayals of South Vietnam, similar to those found in Hollywood films about Vietnam.

== Historical context ==
Vietnam's southward coastal expansion caused significant friction with its Southeast Asian neighbors as early as the 15th Century. The absorption of the lands of Champa and the settlement of the Mekong Delta created a real and perceived threat in the minds of their neighbors, particularly in Cambodia. Likewise, Vietnamese expansion into Laos during this period negatively defined Tai identities against the "civilized" cultural elements that Emperor Lê Thánh Tông had attempted to forcefully impose. In contrast, historical anti-Vietnamese sentiment in Siam reflected the two states' competition for regional hegemony, rivalries reached their height during the Siamese-Vietnamese wars of the late 18th and early 19th centuries.

A majority of these wars were fought in Cambodia, and folk tales about this period often feature Vietnamese antagonists. Misunderstandings were compounded by cultural differences, as the Vietnamese culture, etiquette, and manner of diplomacy were heavily influenced by that of China, whereas the Indochinese kingdoms had historically been part of the Indosphere.

With the subsequent French occupation of Vietnam in the late 19th century, French colonial rulers considered the Vietnamese an inferior race. Originally a neutral term, "Annamites" became more pejorative. Mass uprisings against French colonial overlords increased, and the French tightened their grip on the Vietnamese with more brutal and infamous punishments, including deportations to New Caledonia. French colonial rule would soon be disrupted by the Japanese, but the attitude remained the same, even after World War II, until the Battle of Điện Biên Phủ.

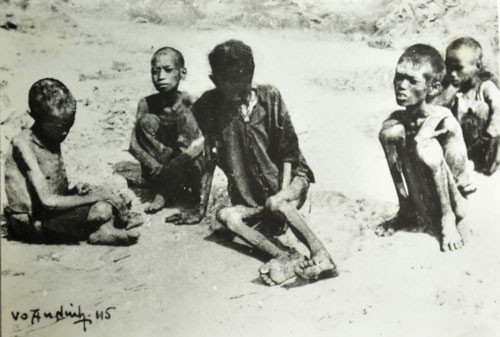
Severely malnourished children in Vietnamese famine of 1944–1945

The Japanese occupation of Vietnam in 1940 placed it under the control of two empires. Japanese and French mismanagement caused the famine of 1945, in which Japanese soldiers refused to give rice to the Vietnamese peasantry to help their war effort, that killed between 1 and 2 million Vietnamese, an act that contributed to the distrust of the Japanese administration in Vietnamese.

Following the French Indochina War was the Vietnam War and American involvement therein. Although the American intervention on behalf of their South Vietnamese ally received a mixed reception. American soldiers committed massacres during the war, with the most infamous being the My Lai massacre, and also controversially used Agent Orange.

The end of the Vietnam War, as an unwanted consequence, made Vietnamophobia grow rapidly among both Asian communists and non-communists alike, such as in China, Thailand, Singapore, North Korea, Malaysia and Cambodia, as the fear of a Vietnamese Intermarium, based on the idea of Poland's Józef Piłsudski, that sought to turn Southeast Asia into a communist/anti-Chinese base increased. The previous Lon Nol government and even the Khmer Rouge encouraged anti-Vietnamese massacres, blaming them for trying to colonize Cambodia, such as the Ba Chúc massacre. In Thailand, the possibility of Vietnamese invasions prompted hostility against anything Vietnamese in Thailand, leading to wide range support for the Khmer Rouge. Singapore and Malaysia also called for sanctions against Vietnam with the accusation of Vietnamese imperialism in Cambodia. North Korea, meanwhile, accused Vietnam for the same reason and supported the anti-Vietnamese movement, hosting Norodom Sihanouk and broadcast anti-Vietnamese propaganda in North Korea. Pirates also attacked and raided Vietnamese boat people fleeing from Vietnam, although whether this was inspired by anti-Vietnamese sentiment is not known to be true.

This trend of anti-Vietnamese sentiment only started to dwindle down after Đổi mới, when Vietnam started economic liberalization and reforms, opening Vietnam to the world which gave them a rising profile of political and economic successes with the normalization of the U.S. and China's relations; however due to historical conflicts, there remains historical animosities towards Vietnam amongst some of its neighbours, particularly Cambodia.

== Use of the term Viet Cong ==
Western media regarding the Vietnam War can be a negative for Vietnam's image. The term Viet Cong has acquired different connotations depending on the context. The term may be used in reference to communist war crimes against South Vietnamese civilians. It may also be used to insult Vietnamese people both in Vietnam and overseas. On the other hand, the label Viet Cong may also be used to justify American war crimes. Additionally, Vietnam War films often center their stories on Americans or are presented from Western perspectives.

== Incidents by country ==
=== Thailand ===
Anti-Vietnamese sentiment in Thailand has been the direct result of historical conflicts with the Vietnamese. Since the series of conflict between the two nations, which began in the 18th century, Siam had only won one conflict, with the others being indecisive or Siamese defeats against Vietnam. Thailand also later participated in the Vietnam War, and took pride in its participation.

When the Khmer Rouge was overthrown in Cambodia, Thailand was one of the main countries that harbored Khmer Rouge's leader and provided them ammunition against Vietnamese forces, owned by the old historical fear of Vietnamese invasion, and accusation over Vietnamese plan to invade Thailand inflamed anti-Vietnamese sentiment in Thailand.

=== Cambodia ===
Anti-Vietnamese sentiment in Cambodia dates back to the Khmer Empire, because the Khmer Empire, as a Chinese vassal, was constantly raiding and conspiring with China's dynasties to attack the Vietnamese in pincer attacks. The Khmers who sparsely inhabited the Mekong Delta started to become inundated by Vietnamese settlers that were allowed to settle by the Cambodian king at the time and in response the Vietnamese were subjected to Cambodian retaliation. After the Vietnamese successfully annexed Champa, they then moved to conquer the Khmers on the Mekong Delta. Following the beginning of French Cochinchina with the arrival of European troops and missionaries, the Cambodians told Catholic European envoys that the Vietnamese government's persecution of Catholics justified the launching of retaliatory attacks against the Vietnamese colonists in Cambodia.

Antipathy against the Vietnamese peaked under the Khmer rouge. In 1978, under the administration of Democratic Kampuchea, especially when Cambodian socialists began to rebel in the eastern zone of Cambodia, Pol Pot ordered his armies to exterminate 1.5 million eastern Cambodians which he branded as "Cambodian with Vietnamese minds" along with the 50 million Vietnamese in the area. This led to a war with the Vietnamese when they began to retaliate for the inhumane genocide and subsequently overthrew the Khmer Rouge.

Thais and Cambodians commonly refer to the Vietnamese as "Youn" (Thai: ญวน, Khmer: យួន). This term probably derives from the Chinese exonym "Yue", which referred to the people of its historic southern coastal regions including Guangdong and Vietnam, and which is a distant cognate of the word Viet. While not historically used as a pejorative, the term is debated to have taken on some derogatory undertones following the Cambodian Civil War and Vietnamese occupation of Cambodia during the 1980s. Michael Vickery suggests that the Khmer Republic and Khmer Rouge may have been deliberately weaponizing colonial orientalists' erroneous attribution of the words etymology to the Pali term "Yona", an ethnonym for the Indo-Greeks that seems to have been applied generically towards other northwestern barbarian groups.

In the 21st Century Cambodian politicians, particularly those in the Cambodia National Rescue Party and its successors, have been accused of favoring the term because of its connotations with Khmer Rouge propaganda that stoked anti-Vietnamese nationalist feeling. Anti-Vietnamese sentiment in contemporary Cambodia is often politically charged both to appeal to nationalism and also to express opposition to Hun Sen, who collaborated with the Vietnamese during their invasion and the subsequent satellite era.

Vietnamese Cambodians are probably one of the nation's largest ethnic minorities but many are undocumented as they are often excluded from citizenship, carrying with them the stigma of being perpetual foreigners. Vietnamese people in Cambodia are known to have experienced discrimination, occasionally manifesting in violence.

Negative public perceptions of government cooperation with Vietnamese businesses accessing Cambodian land and resources pressured Hun Manet to withdraw from the Cambodia–Laos–Vietnam Development Triangle Area in 2024.

=== People's Republic of China ===
As China had occupied the Vietnamese people for 1000 years, there has been a long uneasy sentiment towards China by the Vietnamese and vice versa. Nonetheless, anti-Vietnamese expressions have been dated back longer in Chinese history, especially following the Lý–Song War, during which the Vietnamese army under Lý Thường Kiệt attacks southern Guangxi and parts of southwestern Guangdong in response to invade from the Song dynasty. More than 250,000–400,000 troops and civilians died (including massacre of Yongzhou) and more than half of Song troops died during the counteroffensive against Đại Việt. Chinese historical sources exaggeratedly stated seven million Vietnamese casualties inflicted by Chinese forces during the retaliatory campaign. Brutality against the Vietnamese continued during the Fourth Chinese domination of Vietnam. After its independence, the newly founded Lê dynasty waged several wars against Champa, a Chinese-aligned polity to the east of the Khmer Empire.

During the Sino-Vietnamese War, when China had invaded Vietnam, the Chinese claimed that Vietnamese had invaded them instead and saw the war as self-defense despite being the one who launched the attack. The war is still taught in China as a "war of resistance against Vietnamese invasion".

Recent tensions in the South China Sea have caused more disdain towards the Vietnamese by the Chinese community. In retaliation to territorial disputes, a Chinese restaurant in Beijing refused to serve food to Vietnamese tourists, alongside Filipinos and Japanese. The feelings are also reciprocated from the latter, not just from disputes but also because of COVID-19.

=== Japan ===
Vietnamese people in Japan, among one of Japan's largest foreign communities, have expressed concerns about stereotyping and discrimination due to the operation of Vietnamese organised crime groups. Vietnam's Foreign Ministry stated that Vietnamese representative agencies are cooperating with Japanese authorities in combating crime.

=== Myanmar ===
The people of Myanmar began to express hatred towards Vietnam as well as China and ASEAN countries after the protests, because of suspicions of expressing support for the military government. Mytel, a Viettel's subsidiary, along with Vietnamese companies have been targeted by protesters.

=== Hong Kong ===
Anti-Vietnamese sentiments occurred during the Vietnam War refugee crisis where handling Vietnamese refugees were an issue and were discriminated against in Hong Kong. Hong Kong may also express some anti-Southeast Asian sentiments, look down on countries seen as poor, or having anti-communist sentiments may also target the Vietnamese.

=== South Korea ===
In a similar vein as to how the South Koreans have not been satisfied with Japan's apologies of 'comfort women', the Vietnamese have not found South Korean apologies for actions committed in the Vietnam War acceptable either. South Korean military were in disagreement towards the compensation of Vietnamese victims of the Vietnam War.

=== Russia ===
Hatred towards foreigners especially to non-white people began to rise in Russia as they were blamed for the country's 10 years of failed reforms in which living standards plummeted. Prior to the Chechen–Russian conflict, especially when Russian authorities blamed Chechen Muslims as responsible in the Russian apartment bombings, this has fuelled more hatred towards immigrants in the country. Prior to this, Russian skinheads began to be formed with some of the group members joining to take revenge for their family members that had been killed during the bomb attacks, though some other Russians joined the group because they are just "bored" and want to bully people. Following the attack against Vietnamese in Russia, protests were held by the Vietnamese community in the country, especially after the murder of 20-year-old Vietnamese student, Vu Anh Tuan on 13 October 2004. The protesters state:

We came to study in this country, which we thought was a friend of Vietnam. We do not have drunken fights, we do not steal, we do not sell drugs and we have the right to protection from bandits.

Despite the protest for protection from Russian authorities, Vietnamese people continue to be attacked. On 25 December 2004, two Vietnamese students at the Moscow Energy Institute, Nguyễn Tuấn Anh and Nguyen Hoàng Anh suffered severe injuries and were subsequently hospitalised after they had been assaulted by a group of strangers with knives and clubs on the way back to their dormitory. On 13 March 2005, three Russians stabbed a 45-year-old Vietnamese man named Quân to death in front of his home in Moscow. On 22 March 2008, a 35-year-old Vietnamese woman who worked at a Moscow market stabbed to death in an apparent race-hate killing. On 9 January 2009, a group of strangers in Moscow stabbed a 21-year-old Vietnamese student named Tăng Quốc Bình resulting in his death the next day.

Amid continuous attacks against Vietnamese students and workers, around 600 Vietnamese were rounded up in August 2013 in the city of Moscow and placed in poor condition tents while waiting to be deported from Russia.

==== North Caucasus ====
Reports about the growing Vietnamese population in North Caucasus have resulted in several ethnic violence between ethnic Vietnamese and North Caucasian peoples, notably occurring in Chechnya and Ingushetia. Following a rumor about Chechens being killed by Vietnamese employers, it had sparked uproar and anti-Vietnamese sentiment in social media. In 2013, violence broke out in Malgobek between Vietnamese and Ingush workers, with the Chechens supporting the Ingush, resulting with deaths of several Vietnamese. A year before, ethnic violence between Vietnamese and Ingush also broke out, with the Ingush accused the authorities of Vietnamization of Ingushetia.

=== United States ===
Tension and hatred between Vietnamese immigrants and white fishermen rose up in Galveston Bay, Texas in 1981, and was intensified by the Ku Klux Klan following an invitation from the American fishermen to threatening and intimidating the Vietnamese to leave, which resulted in attacks on Vietnamese boats.

In April 1988, Mark Wahlberg attacked a Vietnamese-American veteran from the Vietnam war with a wooden stick and blinded his eye, calling him "Vietnam fucking shits". Wahlberg attacked a second Vietnamese-American man later the same day, punching him in the eye. When Wahlberg was arrested and returned to the scene of the first assault, he told police officers: "I'll tell you now that's the mother-fucker whose head I split open."

Vietnamese business owners, along with Korean Americans were disproportionately targeted during the Rodney King riots, a result of misdirected anger and hatred.

In June 2020, Matthew Hubbard, a mathematics professor at Laney College, allegedly asked Vietnamese student Phúc Bùi Diễm Nguyễn to "anglicize" her name because he believed it sounded like an offensive phrase in English. Ironically it is the anglicisation that caused offence, and not her true name with diacritics.

== Derogatory terms ==
- Gook – A derogatory slur for Vietnamese and East Asians. It was originally used by the United States Armed Forces during wartime, especially during the Vietnam War.
- Annamite or mites (French) – Originally a neutral and common term referring to Vietnamese people, but it became more pejorative during the late colonial period, though not always.
- Fidschi, also written as Vitschi (German) – East German slur, originally used for Vietnamese guest workers.
- Gaew (แกว) – A Thai and Lao slang word for people who is of Vietnamese descent in Thailand.
- Uzkoglázy (узкоглазый) – East Asian Russian slur meaning "small eyes" or in Russian referring to the prevalence of epicanthic folds in Asian ethnic groups.
- Yuon (យួន) – Originally neutral and only Khmer word for Vietnam that has gradually evolved into becoming a slur.
- Niakoué – French derogatory term for Vietnamese people, derived from the Vietnamese word "nhà quê", itself a derogatory term for people of rural origin.
- Betokon (ベトコン) is a popular Japanese word when Japanese people call Vietnamese people instead of the word Viet Cong. This word was originally only used for Vietnamese people who broke the law in the country, but gradually this word became a negative word that the Japanese used for Vietnamese people. There has been a rise in criminal cases involving Vietnamese interns in Japan.
- Yuènán hóuzi (越南猴子) – Derogatory slur from Chinese towards Vietnamese people meaning "monkey" due to historical sentiments regarding Vietnamese people as barbaric, uncivilized, and animal-like.
- Bat lau dung laai (不漏洞拉) – A phrase now considered derogatory from Cantonese, it is a corruption of the Vietnamese phrase bắt đầu từ nay (扒頭自𫢩; "from now on") used at the beginning of a Vietnamese-language public service announcement in Hong Kong notifying Vietnamese boat people that they would not be granted asylum and would be deported back to Vietnam.

== See also ==
- Racism in Vietnam
- FULRO insurgency
