= Ba Chúc =

Coordinates: 10°30′N 104°54′E

- Commune
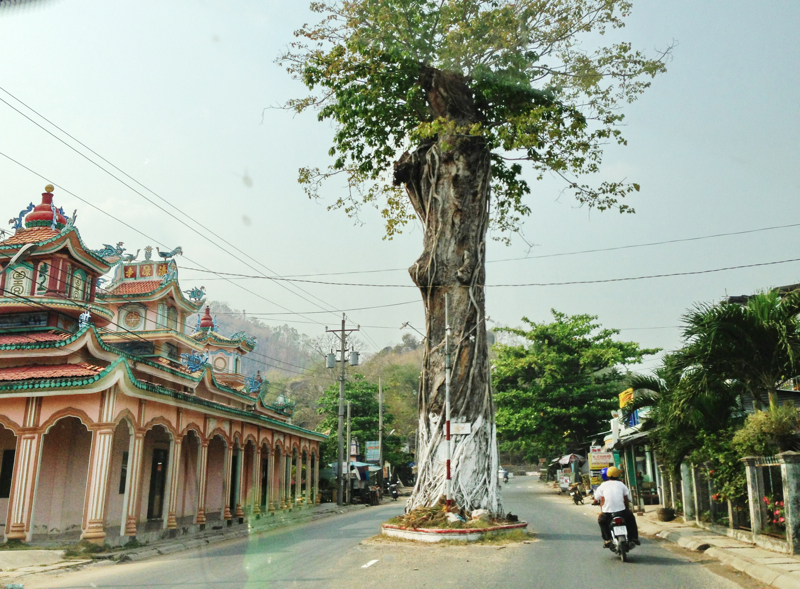
- 300 year old tree on Tượng Mountain, Ba Chúc town.
- Interactive map of Ba Chúc
- Country: Vietnam
- Province: An Giang

Area
  - Total: 7.94 sq mi (20.56 km^{2})

Population (2003)
  - Total: 13,122
  - Density: 1,650/sq mi (638/km^{2})
- Time zone: UTC+07:00 (Indochina Time)

Ba Chúc is a commune (xã) of An Giang Province in Mekong Delta of Vietnam.

During the Vietnam War, the village came to the attention of the American public when it was revealed in The New York Times that civilians there had been forced by ARVN officers and their American advisers to remove landmines planted by Viet Cong and NVA units.

In 1978 the village was the site of the killing of an estimated 3,157 civilians by Khmer Rouge forces from neighbouring Cambodia in what became known as the Ba Chúc Massacre.
