= Ba Chúc massacre =

Mass killing in Vietnam

Coordinates: 10°30′N 104°54′E

- Part of the Cambodian genocide
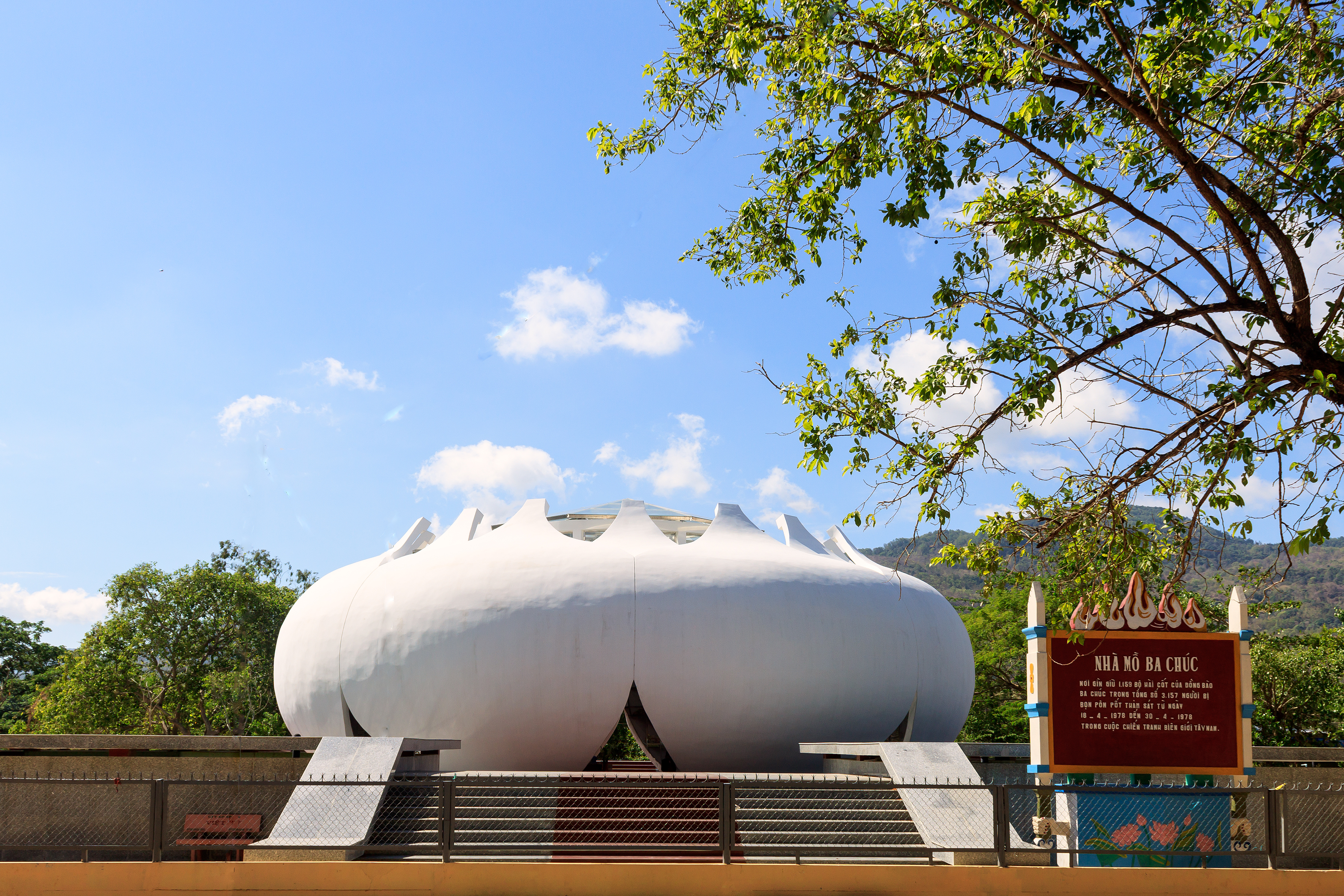
- Ba Chúc Tomb

- Ba Chúc (Vietnam)
- Location: Ba Chúc, An Giang, Vietnam
- Date: 18–30 April 1978
- Target: Vietnamese civilians
- Attack type: Mass killing, massacre, ethnic cleansing, torture
- Deaths: 3,157 civilians
- Perpetrator: Revolutionary Army of Kampuchea (Khmer Rouge)
- Motive: Anti-Vietnamese sentiment, Ethnic cleansing, Khmer ultranationalism

The Ba Chúc massacre (Vietnamese: Thảm sát Ba Chúc) was the mass killing of 3,157 civilians in Ba Chúc, An Giang province, Vietnam, by the Kampuchea Revolutionary Army (Khmer Rouge) from 18 to 30 April 1978. It was a spillover of the Cambodian genocide which also targeted Vietnamese people mainly in Cambodia. The Khmer Rouge took the local villagers to temples and schools to torture and kill them. The residents who fled to the mountains in the following days were also brutally slaughtered. Almost all the victims were shot, stabbed or beheaded.

The event is considered to be the catalyst for the Vietnamese decision to retaliate against Cambodia later that year, which would result in the overthrow of both the Khmer Rouge and its leader Pol Pot.

== Background ==
Communists in Vietnam and Cambodia allied to fight the U.S.-backed government during the Vietnam War, but after taking power the Khmer Rouge leadership began to purge its ranks of Vietnamese-trained personnel and then began to invade Vietnam. On 3 May 1975, Khmer Rouge troops invaded Phu Quoc Island, then on 10 May, they occupied Tho Chu Island, killing 528 civilians, and on 14 June, they were expelled by the Vietnamese People's Army (PAVN).

Despite the conflict, the leaders of the reunified Vietnam and of Cambodia held several public diplomatic exchanges during 1976 to underscore their supposedly-strong ties; however, the Khmer Rouge began cross-border attacks. Such incidents occurred in Kien Giang province on March 15–18, 1977 and in An Giang province from 25 to 28 March, with more attacks on April 30, May 17, and May 19, killing 222 civilians in the May 17 assault. The Central Khmer Rouge shelled Chau Doc, the capital of An Giang Province. On 25 September 1977, during the Mid-Autumn Festival, the Khmer Rouge launched an attack along the Cambodia-Vietnam border, about 10 kilometers deep into the territory of Tay Ninh Province, killing 592 local residents.

== Massacre ==
On 18 April 1978, the Revolutionary Army of Kampuchea crossed the border in Vietnam and surrounded the town of Ba Chúc 6.4 kilometres (4.0 mi) from the border, cutting off all roads leading into the town. The Khmer Rouge then began to go from house to house looting valuables and killing cattle, before burning the houses to the ground. Any civilians caught by the Khmer Rouge soldiers were rounded up into schools and temples and killed with various melee weapons; civilians were shot and had their throats cut or were beaten with sticks. Children were flung into the air and then slashed with bayonets. Women were raped and staked in their genitals to death. Many civilians attempted to hide in the pagodas of Tam Buu and Phi Lai in the town, where they thought they would be safe. The Khmer Rouge quickly surrounded the pagoda and began to fire into it, killing 80 people. At least 100 people tried to surrender to the Khmer Rouge soldiers and were immediately massacred. At Tam Buu Pagoda, about 800 people were marched out of the building into a barren field and executed. Many civilians escaped the massacres in the town and attempted to hide in the caves outside the town. The Khmer Rouge, using tracking dogs, followed the civilians into the caves, throwing grenades and shooting inside to kill the hiding civilians. By 30 April, the Khmer Rouge had retreated from the town before the Vietnamese army showed up leaving land mines that killed or injured another 200. By the end of the massacre, 3,157 civilians had been killed.

Nguyen Van Kinh, a survivor of the massacre, recounted: "... my wife, four children and six grandchildren were all killed. Before shooting, they forced [us] to strip all jewelry and property ... When I woke up, I looked around and saw all the bodies. I was dumbfounded when I saw my granddaughter holding her mother's breast and sucking and next to her dear daughter lying motionless in a pool of blood." He crawled out of a pile of corpses under the cover of darkness and hid in a cave in the Bảy Núi, known as Elephant Mountain, when "those who were mutilated by Pol Pot did not stop screaming". Another survivor, Ha Thi Nga, was taken captive near the border with her parents, siblings, husband and six children and was brutally beaten. Her 8-year-old daughter was hit three times in the head with an iron bar, screaming "Mom, Mom, help me!" When she had regained consciousness, her whole family was dead. Nguyen Thi Ngoc Suong, a girl who fled with her parents to Phi Lai Temple, and the villagers who took refuge inside the temple were driven by the Khmer Rouge to the wasteland outside the temple, where they were shot en masse. She was rescued from a pile of corpses and taken to the hospital after the Khmer Rouge evacuated.

== Aftermath ==
At the end of 1978, Pol Pot used ten divisions to prepare for a full-scale invasion against Vietnam. In this context, on 7 December 1978, the Political Bureau of the Central Committee of the Communist Party of Vietnam and the Central Military Commission passed the decision to officially enter the Third Indochina War and overthrow Pol Pot's regime. Instead of retreating to safer areas for long term guerrilla warfare right from the start, overestimating their own strength, the majority of the Kampuchean Revolutionary Army (KRA) forces faced the PAVN head on, only to be easily defeated by the far more experienced Vietnamese military within 2 weeks. The Khmer Rouge rapidly collapsed and was overthrown on 7 January 1979 as it fled across the Cambodia–Thailand border and went into hiding, thus ending the Cambodian genocide as a whole.

== Memorial ==
After the war, in 1979, the An Giang provincial government built a cemetery for the deceased in Ba Chuc. Every year on 15 and 16 March of the lunar calendar, collective sacrificial ceremonies were held for the deceased. The cemetery and the two temples used for the massacre are listed as national historical sites. In 2011, An Giang Province allocated 30 billion Vietnamese đồng to rebuild the cemetery for the victims. The cemetery covers an area of 50,000 square metres (5 ha), including a 500-square-metre (0.05 ha) cemetery. The tomb and the memorial hall displays pictures and objects of the scene. The memorial hall displays photos of the scene and the spears, sticks and other weapons used by the Khmer Rouge to carry out the massacre, and the burial chamber contains the remains of 1,159 uncollected victims of the massacre, of which 1,017 skulls have been classified according to their age. and gender identification, including 29 infants, 88 girls aged 16–20, 155 females aged 21–44, 103 females aged 41–60, 86 females over 60, 23 males aged 16–20, 79 males aged 21–40, 162 males aged 41–60, and 38 males over 60. The remains of the remaining victims were either buried by their relatives, or were left in the caves of Elephant Mountain. Because some of the holes were too deep to lift the remains out, relatives had to fill the holes with soil.

== See also ==
- Bù Đốp masscare
- Bibliography of the Cambodian genocide
