= Persecution of the Montagnard in Vietnam =

- Part of Racism in Vietnam and aftermath of FULRO insurgency
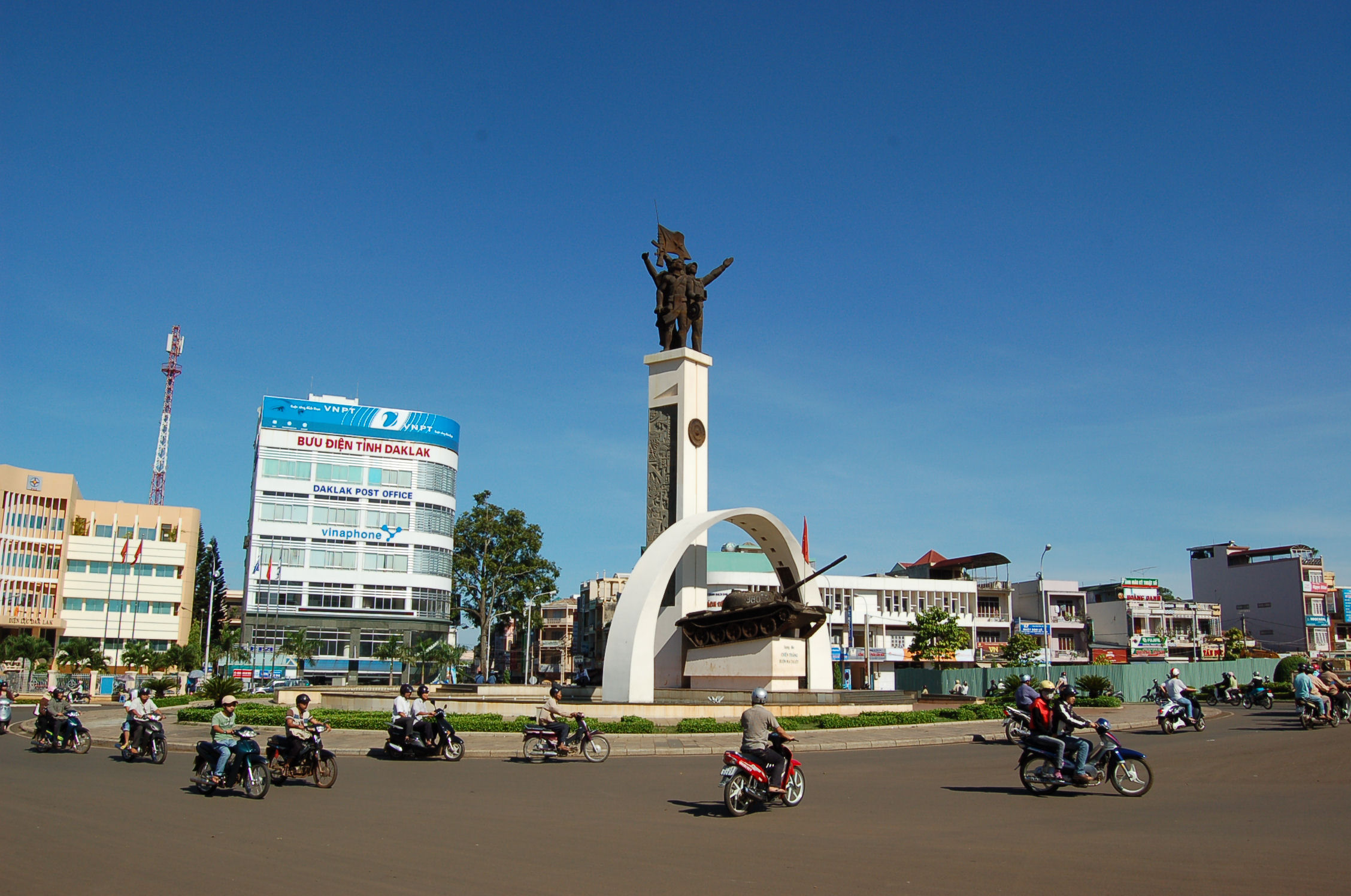
- A statute in Buôn Ma Thuột commemorating the contribution of the Central Highlands tribes during the Vietnam War.
- Location: Vietnam
- Type: Persecution
- Cause: Land seizure, internal colonialism, ethnic assimilation, racism
- Target: Montagnards
- Deaths: Hundreds

The native inhabitants of the Central Highlands of Vietnam are known as the Montagnard. The Vietnamese conquered the Central Highlands during their "march to the south" (Nam tiến). Ethnic Vietnamese people (Kinh people) now outnumber the indigenous "Degars" (a term for the Montagnard considered to be derogatory) after state-sponsored colonization directed by both the government of South Vietnam and the current Communist government of unified Vietnam. The Montagnards have engaged in conflicts with the Vietnamese, from the anti-Communist South Vietnamese government, the Viet Cong, to the Communist government of unified Vietnam. There are contrasting views on this issue, as the constitution of the government of Vietnam states "Article 36 of the Constitution, the state invests heavily in education and supports various preferential programmes for ethnic minorities, like ethnic minority boarding schools, lower entry requirements and quota for minorities." Both the initial 1945 constitution and the revised 1992 constitution of North Vietnam and the successor state, the Socialist Republic of Vietnam, stated that all minority groups in Vietnam have the right to maintain their mother tongues in their schooling as well as to use their languages to preserve their ethnic cultures and values, although the degree of enforcement remains ongoingly debated due to the situation's complicated nature.

== Background ==
The Champa state and Chams in the lowlands were traditional suzerains whom the Montagnards in the highlands acknowledged as their lords, while autonomy was held by the Montagnards. After World War II the concept of "Nam tiến" and the southward conquest was celebrated by Vietnamese scholars. The Pays Montagnard du Sud-Indochinois was the name of the Central Highlands from 1946 under French Indochina.

Up until French rule, the Central Highlands was alleged by one American source as almost never entered by the Vietnamese since they viewed it as a savage (Moi-Montagnard) populated area with fierce animals like tigers, "poisoned water" and "evil malevolent spirits", but the Vietnamese expressed interest in the land after the French transformed it into a profitable plantation area to grow crops on, in addition to the natural resources from the forests, minerals and rich earth and realization of its crucial geographical importance. However, the French tactic of divide-and-conquer to fragment national independent movements was also used, using specially-recruited Montagnard divisions and troops and dividing the region.

In 1955, Northern Vietnamese migrants were settled in the Central Highlands after the autonomous Montagnard area was abolished by Ngô Đình Diệm. Y Bham Enuol founded Bajaraka on January 5, 1958 to resist the discrimination, Vietnamese settlement on Highlands and forced assimilation by the South Vietnamese government. The United Nations Secretary-General and foreign embassies were contacted by Y Bham Enuol. "Front for the Liberation of the Highlands of Champa" (Mặt Trận Giải Phóng Cao Nguyên Champa) and Bajaraka were both headed by Y Bham Enuol. He was killed by the Khmer Rouge on April 20, 1975. The support of Central Highlands tribe was seen as essential to Hanoi's war strategy, and various tribes had supported the National Liberation Front, with a Christian Rade people Y Bih Aleo serving as the vice-President of the NLF. Several Montagnard agents had assisted PAVN attacks against U.S Special Forces camps and personnel within the region, and their antagonism with the Army of the Republic of Vietnam caused them to not warn them of attacks during the 1975 campaigns.

Les Kosem, Y Bham Enuol and Prince Norodom Sihanouk worked together to found FULRO and launch an uprising against the South Vietnamese government to regain their land from the Vietnamese colonizers. Since 1964 the Montagnards of FULRO struggled for their own country and continued to fight against the Vietnamese Communist regime which persecuted them for their religious beliefs. After mass jailings and killings during the 2001 and 2004 protests by ethnic hill tribe minorities against the Vietnamese regime, foreigners were banned from the Central Highlands for a period of time by Vietnam.

== Forced Colonization of the Central Highlands during the Indochina War(s) ==
The Montagnards in FULRO fought the Vietnamese for twenty years after the end of the Vietnam War and the scale of Vietnamese attacks on the Montagnards are alleged by one US author as having killed over 200,000 Montagnards after 1975 during the war between FULRO and Vietnam in the Central Highlands, as the Vietnamese lease land for Japanese companies to harvest lumber in the area. Munitions, weapons, and 5,000 rifles were given by the Chinese to some Montagnard groups after some Montagnards requested help from China via Thai General Savit-Yun K-Yut since the United States refused to help the FULRO Montagnards against the Vietnamese. Torture and mass arrests by the Vietnamese military were used in the Central Highlands against the Degar during the February 2001 protests against Vietnamese oppression.

The Chinese, the Central Highlands Montagnards, Cham, and Delta Cambodians (Khmer Krom) were all alienated by the South Vietnamese government under Diem. The Montagnard Highlands were subjected to colonization by ethnic Vietnamese under Diem. A complete rejection of Vietnamese rule was felt by non-NLF tribes of the Montagnards in 1963.

The Vietnamese were originally centered around the Red River Delta but engaged in conquest and seized new lands such as Champa, the Mekong Delta (from Cambodia) and the Central Highlands during Nam Tien, while the Vietnamese received strong Chinese influence in their culture and civilization and were Sinicized, and the Cambodians and Laotians were Indianized, the Montagnards in the Central Highlands maintained their own native culture without adopting external culture and were the true indigenous natives of the region, and to hinder encroachment on the Central Highlands by Vietnamese nationalists, the term Pays Montagnard du Sud-Indochinois PMSI emerged for the Central Highlands along with the natives being addressed by the name Montagnard. The Vietnamese Kinh colonists flooding into the Central Highlands has significantly altered the demographics of the region. Violent demonstrations with fatalities have broken out due to Montagnard anger at Vietnamese discrimination and seizure of their land since many Vietnamese Kinh were settled by the government in the Central Highlands.

An insurgency was waged by Montagnards in FULRO against South Vietnam and then unified Communist Vietnam. A colonization program of Kinh Vietnamese by the South Vietnamese government and united Vietnamese Communist government was implemented and now a Kinh majority predominates in the highland areas. The Montagnard lands in the Central Highlands were subjected to state sponsored colonization by ethnic Vietnamese settlers under the South Vietnamese regime of Ngo Dinh Diem which resulted in estranging the Montagnards and leading them to reject Vietnamese rule. FULRO however did not represent the sole force or organisation among the Montagnards, Khmer Krom and other groups, as the Cambodian Campaign that created refugees in the region had caused many to join the Viet Cong and become members. The appeal of "defending the fatherland" against foreign attack appealed to many.

The South Vietnamese and Communist Vietnamese colonization of the Central Highlands has been compared to the historic Nam tiến of previous Vietnamese rulers. During the Nam tiến (March to the South) Khmer and Cham territory was seized and militarily colonized (đồn điền) by the Vietnamese which was repeated by the state-sponsored colonization of Northern Vietnamese Catholic refugees on Montagnard land by the South Vietnamese leader Diem and the introduction to the Central Highlands of "New Economic Zones" by the now Communist Vietnamese government. The Vietnamese Communists are alleged to have implemented harsh punishment against the Montagnards after the defeat of South Vietnam. Whether these issues are true or not is openly disputable, given that the Vietnamese constitution officially recognises all the present central highlands minority groups. Furthermore, this group exhibited strongly-divided loyalties, many had joined with the NLF in opposition to Saigon policies.

Some Vietnamese viewed and dealt with the indigenous Montagnards in the CIDG from the Central Highlands as "savages" and this caused a Montagnard uprising against the Vietnamese. Some Montagnard Rhades mounted a revolt, seizing hundreds of Vietnamese civilians and soldiers, assassinating officers of the Vietnamese special forces and seizing American advisers on 19–20 September but the 23rd Division of the South Vietnamese army stopped them from sizing Ban Me Thout, the provincial capital of Darlac Province. In the Central Highlands the Montagnard FULRO organization fought against both the Communists and South Vietnamese due to discrimination by the South Vietnamese army against the Montagnards. After the victory of the Communist North Vietnamese, the Vietnamese refused autonomy to the Montagnards, and on Montagnard land they settled around one million ethnic Vietnamese in addition to using "reducation camps" on the Montagnards, leading the Montagnard FULRO to continue the armed struggle against the Vietnamese.

Ethnic minorities in general have also been referred to as "moi", including other "hill tribes" like the Muong. The anti-ethnic minority discriminatory policies by the Vietnamese, environmental degradation, deprivation of lands from the natives, and settlement of native lands by a massive number of Vietnamese settlers led to massive protests and demonstrations by the Central Highland's indigenous native ethnic minorities against the Vietnamese in January–February 2001 and this event gave a tremendous blow to the claim often published by the Vietnamese government that in Vietnam There has been no ethnic confrontation, no religious war, no ethnic conflict. And no elimination of one culture by another. The same state-sponsored settlement of ethnic minority land by Vietnamese Kinh has happened in another highland region, the Annamite Cordillera (Trường Sơn), both the Central Highlands and Annamite Cordillera were populated by ethnic minorities who were not Vietnamese during the 20th century's start, but the demographics of the highlands was drastically transformed with the mass colonization of 6 million settlers from 1976 to the 1990s, which led to ethnic Vietnamese Kinh outnumbering the native ethnic groups in the highlands.

== Cultural and demographic purging ==
Leaving out any plans for autonomy for ethnic minorities, an assimilation plan was launched by the South Vietnamese government with the creation of the "Social and Economic Council for the Southern Highlander Country". The South Vietnamese based their approach to the highlanders by claiming that they would be "developed" since they were "poor" and "ignorant", making swidden agriculturalists sedentarize and settling ethnic Vietnamese colonists from the coastal regions into the highlands such as Northern Vietnamese Catholic refugees who fled to South Vietnam, 50,000 Vietnamese settlers were in the highlands in 1960 and in 1963 the total number of settlers was 200,000 and up to 1974 the South Vietnamese were still implemented the colonization plan even though the highland natives experienced massive turbulence and disorder because of the colonization, and by 1971 less than half of a scheme back by the Americans to leave Montagnards with just 20% of the Central Highlands was completed, and even in the parts of the highlands which did not experience colonization, the South Vietnamese threw the native tribes into "strategic hamelets" to keep them away from places where communists potentially operated and the South Vietnamese consistently spurned any attempts too make overtures to the native Highlanders.

The effort to free the Cham people was led by Major General Les Kosem. The Cham people keep the soul of FULRO alive according to former FULRO Cham member Po Dharma who went on a journey to see Les Kosem's grave.

A 2002 article in the Washington Times reported that Montagnard women were subjected to forced mass sterilization by the Vietnamese government for the Montagnard's population to be reduced, in addition to stealing lands of the Montagnards, and attacking their religious beliefs, killing and torturing them in a form of "creeping genocide".

Luke Simpkins, an MP in the House of Representatives of Australia condemned the Vietnamese persecution of the Central Highland Montagnards and noting both the South Vietnamese government and regime of unified Communist Vietnam attacked the Montagnards and colonized their lands, mentioning FULRO which fought against the Vietnamese and the desire for the Montagnards to preserve their culture and language. The Vietnamese government has non-Montagnards settle on Montagnard land and killed Montagnards after jailing them.

== Government crackdowns ==
=== 2001 mass protests ===
On January 29, 2001, two Montagnards, Rahlan Djan and Rahlan Pon, were abused and arrested by the Vietnamese. Ex-FULRO member Ksor Kok helped bring attention to their plight. Plantations run by the government were built on the land of the Montagnards which were also settled by lowlanders. Montagnards were made to give up their lands for far less than they were worth to the Vietnamese government. The jailed Montagnards had been subjected to torture by the Vietnamese government which caused the mass protests. There were 30 police officers wounded in Buon Ma Thuot in Daklak and Pleiku. Coffee farming and colonization of ethnic Vietnamese in the Central highlands are supported by the Vietnamese government. The natives were attacked by Vietnamese helicopters and soldiers in Daklak and Gia Lai provinces. Another wave of Montagnard refugees in Cambodia happened after the Vietnamese government crackdown on the protests in the Central Highlands in February 2001. After attempting to escape Vietnam or demonstrating against the government, jail terms were imposed upon over 70 Montagnards.

=== 2004 mass protests ===
The first Montagnard protests were started when 3 Montagnards were detained by the Vietnamese in February 2001. Dak Lak's capital Buon Ma Thuot was the scene of the convergence of Montagnards in the thousands on April 20, 2004. Tanks were deployed water cannons, electric sticks and gas were deployed by the police. Gia Lai's districts of Dak Doa, Cu Se, and Ayun Pa on April 11 were the scenes of further protests by Montagnards against the Vietnamese. Human Rights Watch also reported deaths and injuries among the Montagnards in the 2004 uprising. Indigenous land restitution was a demand of the non-violent Montagnard protesters. External contact was limited and three or more people gathering was prohibited, along with Central Highlands internal movement. House arrest was implemented with Vietnamese police entered the houses and villages of the Montagnards. Multiple incidents of Vietnamese jailing and assaulting Montagnards were documented in 2003 and 2004. Gia Lai and Daklak were the scene of the mass 2004 demonstrations. The Montagnard demonstrators demanded that they be given their lands and be justly treated. The demonstrations involved thousands and police and demonstrators were among the injured. Like the 2001 mass demonstrations, Buon Ma Thuot was once again the scene of a huge gathering of Montagnards demanding that their traditional Daklak lands be given back and religious freedom allowed. Plantations were set up on stolen land where the Montagnards were driven out of by the Vietnamese government since the Vietnamese use it for growing coffee. Indigenous land seizure was one of the complaints of the rally in Daklak outside of the Vietnamese government buildings by the Montagnards. The Vietnamese arrested Montagnards during the demonstrations and people were hurt during fights which broke out. The Montagnard Foundation was accused by the Vietnamese government.

Montagnard participants were estimated around 10,000 or 30,000. Foreign monitors were banned by the Vietnamese. Access to the Central Highlands was demanded by Human Rights Watch. Private Vietnamese citizens helped the Vietnamese police assault, thrash, and murder Montagnards in the middle of coffee plantations and in the streets, including a blind Montagnard woman. The Human Rights Watch report was cited in the United States House of Representatives. Demonstrators were hunted down with dogs in coffee plantations by the Vietnamese, according to a Baptist news service. Tourists and airlines were barred as were foreign embassy officers. Montagnards were sterilized involuntarily by the Vietnamese. Indigenous land theft by the Vietnamese was the cause of the protests.

According to a Christian News Service, there has been acute discrimination of the Montagnards by the Vietnamese. A whitewashing campaign of the sanguine events by the Vietnamese government was accused by Human Rights Watch. Killings perpetrated by the Vietnamese were witnessed and divulged to Human Rights Watch. The Vietnamese launched ambuscade and surprise traps against protesters. Vietnamese civilians joined Vietnamese security forces in assaulting the Buonmathuot Degar Montagnard protesters. Vietnamese civilians helped the Vietnamese police assault and massacre Montagnard demonstrators. Traps were set up by the Vietnamese at locations where they started violently assaulting the protesters.

The protests were crushed by the Vietnamese government and the toll inflicted was substantial. Vietnamese government media claimed that the death toll was two people. The demonstrations were mostly ignored by Vietnamese media. There were deaths caused by shootings and violent batterings of Montagnards at the hands of the Vietnamese according to Human Rights Watch. There was documentation of the killings of 10 Montagnards according to Human Rights watch while 8 were documented by Amnesty International. A whitewashing was alleged by HRW while the situation of ethnic minorities was criticized by Amnesty. When the protests were crushed villages were missing a large number of their inhabitants. Prohibitions slapped on the entry of non-Vietnamese and censorship failed to stop reports of accounts of murder and torment inflicted upon Montagnards at the hands of Vietnamese citizens and police. The Vietnamese government implemented a campaign to censor and whitewash the events. One number given of protest participants was 400,000 while an approximate number of deaths was given at 400. During the protests Montagnards were shot according to Save the Montagnards leader George Clark. 2,000 Montagnards were alleged to have been killed with rivers being used as dumping grounds for bodies by the Vietnamese according to the Montagnard Foundation.

Vietnam claimed as lies the reports by Montagnard Foundation and Human Rights Watch, denied discrimination and claimed that the Central Highlands people were being taken care of by Vietnam. Vietnam claimed it allowed freedom of belief and tolerance for minorities in response to the unrest. Rubber weapons only were used according to Vietnamese claims in response to accusations of using guns and killing demonstrators by thrashing them. The people wanted their land back. The Vietnamese Embassy in the United States and the Foreign Ministry of Vietnam claimed no discrimination was going on and everything was normal. The Montagnard demonstrators were accused of being separatists who wanted their own country by the Vietnamese government. The Montagnard Foundation was blamed by Vietnam. Threats were made against potential future demonstrators by the Vietnamese government after they crushed the Central Highlands demonstrations with the Montagnard being named as a source of enmity by Nguyen Tan Dung, the Deputy Prime Minister. Foreigners were accused of inciting the demonstrations by Vietnam and the ability of the demonstrations to take place was blamed on leniency on part of the state by Nguyen Tan Dung, the Deputy Prime Minister.

Once the protests were crushed by the Vietnamese, a Vietnamese government controlled and monitored tour of the Central Highlands of non-Vietnamese reporters was given after caving into the strong reaction by other countries to the events. Non Vietnamese were banned from the Central Highlands while the demonstrations were crushed by Vietnamese police. Buon Ma Thuoat was flooded by Vietnamese armed forces after crushing the rally in which Montagnards took part in by the hundreds. Foreigners were banned by the Vietnamese police from entering Buon Ma Thuot. Religious and ethnic groups are oppressed by the Vietnamese government according to the Montagnard Foundation. The highlands were closed to every single non-Vietnamese after the protests. The airports in Pleiku and Buon Ma Thuot were forbidden from allowing non-Vietnamese in. Special permission is needed for non-Vietnamese reporters and consular officers. On April 24, it was reported that the Central Highlands were reopened to non-Vietnamese. Neutral journalism was forbidden when reporters were finally permitted in after the European Union and Human Rights organizations strong armed access after there was a total lack of reporting on the demonstrations for 3 weeks. 19 were murdered according to organizations while 2 died according to Vietnam.

Cambodia was the destination of many Montagnards who fled the crackdown in which the number of people detained and hurt reached into the hundreds after the Vietnamese Communists crushed the protesters, who sought to address the theft of their land by the Vietnamese government. The Vietnamese crackdown against the Montagnards in 2001 and 2004 over their land rights resulted in Cambodia experiencing an Exodus of Montagnard asylum seekers. The savage events led to Cambodia becoming a destination for fleeing Montagnards. Deportations were made by Cambodia of Montagnards who had escaped the Vietnamese. Asylum for the Montagnards was advocated to the United Nations and the government of Cambodia by Cambodian King Sihanouk. Khmer Kampuchea Krom Federation (KKF) supported the statement made by King Sihanouk on the situation. Sanctuary for Montagnards running away from the crackdown was requested of the Cambodian government by KKF.

Italy and the USA attempted to investigate the crackdown. The Radical Party of Italy brought attention to the plight of the Montagnards to the European Parliament. Transparency was requested of the Vietnamese government by the European Union. The Vietnamese crackdown on the Montagnards 2004 Easter demonstrations led to denunciation from the European Union. The Central Highlands were requested to be open up to non-Vietnamese by the EU since the area was off limits to foreign reporters. Foreign ambassadors and monitors were banned from the area by the Vietnamese. Entry to the Central Highlands was demanded by the Italian and American embassies. House Resolution 613 was initiated by Republican representative Tom Davis over persecution in Vietnam. Italy called for Montagnard asylum seekers to be allowed into Cambodia and called the Montagnard persecution at the hands of the Vietnamese to end. In the European Parliament a condemnation of the Vietnamese persecution of Montagnards was proposed by the Italian Radical Party. The Italian Radical Party and Mountagnard Fondation's remarks were attacked as false by the Vietnamese Foreign Ministry. Due to the bloody crackdown in the Central Highlands, in Washington D.C. the Vietnam embassy was the scene of protests. Hmong and Laos opposition supported the Montagnards due to Vietnam's alliance with the government of Laos.

== Contemporary persecution ==
Montagnards are oppressed and abused by the Vietnamese regime with their land being seized and stolen by the Vietnamese, the Cambodian-Vietnamese border blocked by the Vietnamese to stop them from leaving as refugees and the Vietnamese torturing Montagnards with electricity and beatings. As a means of intimidation, the Vietnamese gather hundreds of spectators to watch trials of arrested Montaganrds and force public repudiation of religious belief upon them. The Vietnamese accuse Montagnards of being "reactionary".

The UN Committee on the Elimination of Racial Discrimination expressed concern regarding discriminatory treatment of Vietnamese ethnic minorities, including the Montagnards, during its 80th session.

Demanding that the Vietnamese government stop repressing ethnic minorities and religion, the "Coalition for Indigenous Peoples in Vietnam" was formed out of the Thai, Khmer Krom, and Montagnards after they combined forces against the Vietnamese.

Independence from the Communist authorities was desired by the Montagnards after the Vietnam War since they were killed, abused, discriminated against and jailed by the Vietnamese authorities so many of them were forced to run away from the Central Highlands as refugees. Cambodia and eventually the United States were their destinations.

Death, torture, and incarceration were the punishments inflicted on Montagnards gathering in groups of three or more by the Vietnamese with their religion severely persecuted and repressed at the hands of the Vietnamese Communist regime since 1975.

A thirteen-year-old Montagnard girl Y Kang was severely assaulted, beaten and kicked along with 16 Montagnard women and men by Vietnamese police in Gai Lai province, Plei Ku city, district Mang Yang, commune H'ra in Buon Kret Krot village on July 7, 2011. In the wake of the assault, the United Nations and U.S. State Department were criticized by the Montagard Foundation for its lack of reaction to such occurrences.

The Vietnamese regime claims that Montagnard separatism is conducted by religious matters and uses this as a reason to attack their religion. Montagnard land was seized by the Vietnamese government after the Vietnam War. In 2010, Montagnards were assaulted and detained by the Vietnamese in Gia Lai province, Chu Prong district. Areas of Vietnam such as the Central Highlands are off limit to human rights organizations and reporters.

== See also ==
- Degar
- Indochina Wars
- Cham-Annamese War (1471)
- Insurgency in Laos
- Central Highlands (Vietnam)
- United Front for the Liberation of Oppressed Races (FULRO)
- Đắk Sơn massacre - at the hands of the Viet Cong
- Battle of Loc Ninh
- Indochina refugee crisis
- Mass killings under communist regimes
