= BAJARAKA =

Separatist movement in Vietnam

Flag of BAJARAKA representing four ethnic groups of the Montagnards.

BAJARAKA (stand for Bahnar, Jarai, Rade, and Kaho) was a separatist movement that protested the discriminatory policies against the Montagnards in the Central Highlands under the Republic of Vietnam government. It was the predecessor of the United Front for the Liberation of Oppressed Races (FULRO) organization.

== Background ==
After the Geneva Conference in 1954, Prime Minister Ngô Đình Diệm abolished the status of Domain of the Crown, that is, ending the privileges of Head of State by Bảo Đại over the Central Highlands region and incorporated this land into the common territory of the Republic of Vietnam. Therefore, the Court based on Montagnard customary law was abolished and replaced with national law. The aim of this new policy is to build equality, solidarity and integration for development.

After the founding of the Republic of Vietnam, the government of the First Republic opened the Office of Senior Advisors, It was later upgraded to the Upper Highlands Social Work Department under the Presidential Palace to manage the economic and social development of the Central Highlands region. Economically, there was an expansion of cultivated land and the establishment of plantations, settling hundreds of thousands of people from the north migrated to the south. There are also those who are taken to mountainous areas.

Administratively, the government also abolished the separate Montagnard civil service ranks starting on 9 May 1958, related to President Ngô Đình Diệm:

"Dù Kinh hay Thượng phải căn cứ vào học vấn hay năng lực mà sử dụng."

In English: "Whether Kinh or Montagnard must be based on education or ability to use."

— Ngô Đình Diệm

Some Montagnards who previously enjoyed priority have now lost that status. Meanwhile, land reform was carried out which caused the Montagnard families to lose hereditary ownership of their land. These factors gradually increased dissatisfaction among the Montagnard community. The government also dissolved feudal customary courts with the aim of prioritizing national law. Although there is no document that officially abolishes the above regulations, but in reality the courts used Montagnard customary law and did not uphold it, creating further conflict between the Montagnards and the Vietnamese government.

== History ==
In 1955, the Highlanders Liberation Front (French: Front de Libération des Montagnards; FLM) appeared in Đắk Lắk initiated by the Rade ethnic group to protest the policies of the Ngô Đình Diệm government. In May 1955, with the support of other ethnic groups, the movement took the name BAJARAKA, a name made up of four major ethnic groups: Bahnar, Jarai, Rade, and Kaho. The movement's leadership group included Y Bhăm Êñuôl (Rade ethnic; founder), Siu Síp (Jarai ethnic), Y Dhơn Adrong (principal of Lac Thien Primary School), Y Nuin Hmok (Kram high school teacher), Y Nam Êban (military officer), Paul Nưr (Bahnar intellectual), and many scholars of Cham, Ma, Stieng origins, Y Bhăm Êñuôl established the Central Autonomous Committee, headquartered in Pleiku, to command the movement.

In May 1958, BAJARAKA sent a protest letter to the French embassy, The United States and United Nations ambassadors, denounced the discriminatory acts of the Republic of Vietnam government against ethnic minorities and their achievements in fighting against the militarists of the Japanese Empire, Việt Minh, and Việt Cộng. They asked the great powers to intervene to give the Montagnards independence.

In August and September 1958, the BAJARAKA movement organized many protests in Kon Tum, Pleiku, and Buôn Ma Thuột. The protests were suppressed and movement leaders such as Y Bhăm Êñuôl, Y Dhơn Adrong, Y Dhê Adrong, Y Nuin Hmok, Y Wick Buôn Ya, Y Het Kpor, Y Tluốp Kpor, Y Sênh Niê, Y Bun Sor, Y Yu Êban, Y Thih Êban, Touneh Yoh, Siu Síp, Paul Nưr, and Nay Luet were arrested.

From 1956 to 1962, believing that the Montagnards were very good fighters in the jungles, American military advisers entered the villages, equipping individuals with weapons, establishing Civilian Indigenous Defense Groups (CIDG) and Special Forces to fight the communists. The Montagnards were drawn into the Vietnam War some siding with Communism after the National Liberation Front of South Vietnam was founded in 1960. Others supported the government of the Republic of Vietnam. At the same time in Phnom Penh in late 1960, two groups of Cham and Khmer Krom also established the Front for the Liberation of Champa and the Liberation Front of Kampuchea Krom opened the way for ethnic groups in South Vietnam to unite.

== Establishment of the Central Highlands Liberation Front (FLHP) ==
On 19 May 1961, the Communists convened 23 delegates of the Central Highlands ethnic groups and established the Central Highlands Autonomous Movement (French: Mouvement pour l'Autonomie des Hauts Plateaux) into the hands of Y Bih Alêô to cooperate with the Communist army. When the First Republic of Vietnam was overthrown, all the leaders of the BAJARAKA movement who had previously been imprisoned were released through the intervention of the United States, further strengthened the Central Highlands Autonomous Movement. In March 1964, leader BAJARAKA established the Central Highlands Liberation Front (French: Front de Libération des Hauts Plateaux; FLHP), completely changed the policy from demanding autonomy to independent secession. From the very beginning, the Central Highlands Liberation Front was divided into two factions:

- Moderate faction with the Government of the Republic of Vietnam, represented by Y Bhăm Ênuôl.
- Independent Highlands separatist faction, led by Y Dhơn Adrong.

The independent Highlands Separatists faction, who were fiercely pursued by the Army of the Republic of Vietnam, had to flee to Cambodia for refugee and set up a base around Camp Le Rolland (in Mondulkiri province), northeast of Cambodia, 15 kilometers from the Vietnamese border.

== 1964 FLHP rebellion ==
On 26 August 1964, a congress of 55 moderate Montagnards, representing ethnic minorities, met in Pleiku. Fearing being excluded from the negotiations, the rebels staged an uprising on the night of 19 September 1964. Special Forces commandos and Highlands Civilian Combat Teams captured a number of outposts in Quảng Đức province such as Đức Lập, Bù Đăng, and Bù Đốp. The rebels controlled Highway 14, attacked Srépok post, then advanced to Buôn Ma Thuột, occupied the VTVN radio station, and called on the Montagnards to rise up against the Kinh to build an independent nation. The uprising killed 35 Republic of Vietnam soldiers.

On 20 September 1964, General Nguyễn Phước Vĩnh Lộc, commander of Tactical Zone II, declared martial law in Buôn Ma Thuột, the 23rd Division, along with several commando and armored battalions, were mobilized to retake the radio station and other rebel-occupied outposts. When the rebel forces were about to be completely destroyed, the US embassy suddenly advised Vĩnh Lộc to negotiate.

Y Bhăm Êñuôl á representative of the moderate faction of FLHP, was invited to negotiate with the rebels. The results of the agreements:

- Y Bhăm Êñuôl was appointed as the official president of the FLHP movement. However, Y Bham Eñuol fled to Cambodia on the afternoon of 20 September.
- Rebel commanders were not prosecuted and were not pursued as they withdrew through Cambodia.

== Unite to founding the FULRO ==
After Y Bhăm Êñuôl escaped to Cambodia, FLHP linked up with:

1. Front for the Liberation of Champa (French: Front pour la Libération du Champa; FLC), or known as FULRO Cham, led by Les Kosem (a Cambodian paratrooper general of Cham descent).
2. Liberation Front of Kampuchea Krom in southwestern part of Vietnam (French: Front de Libération du Kampuchea Krom; FLKK), or known as FULRO Khmer, led by Chau Dera.
3. Establish a unified organization called United Front for the Liberation of Oppressed Races (French: Front Unifié de Lutte des Races Opprimées; FULRO).

== See also ==
- Persecution of the Montagnard in Vietnam
- FULRO insurgency

== Bibliography ==
- Lê Đình Chi. Người Thượng Miền Nam Việt Nam. Gardena, CA: Văn Mới, 2006.
- Po Dharma. Champaka 7: Từ mặt trận FLM đến phong trào FULRO. San Jose, CA: Office International of Champa, 2007.
