= 1964 FLHP rebellion =

- Part of the Vietnam War and FULRO insurgency
- A Montagnard tribesman during training in 1962.
Date	26 August – 20 September 1964
Location	Central Highlands, South Vietnam
Result	Inconclusive: Initial Montagnards success; South Vietnamese Government Recapture the radio station in Ban Mê Thuật; Withdrawal of Montagnards to Cambodia

Belligerents
Provisional Government of South Vietnam: High National Council (civillian); Military Revolutionary Council	Central Highlands Liberation Front; BAJARAKA

Commanders and leaders
Phan Khắc Sửu (de jure head of state); Nguyễn Xuân Oánh De facto rulers: Nguyễn Khánh; Dương Văn Minh; Trần Thiện Khiêm; Nguyễn Phước Vĩnh Lộc; Hoàng Xuân Lãm	Y Bham Enuol; Y Dhơn Adrong (POW)

Units involved
II Corps: 23rd Division	None

Casualties and losses
56 killed	Unknown

FLHP rebellion, fought in Central Highlands, South Vietnam, was an uprising of the Vietnam War, between the Army of the Republic of Vietnam (ARVN) and the Central Highlands Liberation Front (FLHP).

== Rebellion ==
On 26 August 1964, a congress of 55 moderate Montagnards, representing ethnic minorities, met in Pleiku, Vietnam. Fearing being excluded from the negotiations, the rebels staged an uprising On the night of 19 to 20 September 1964 Montagnard strike force personnel in five CIDG camps near Ban Me Thuot initiated the revolt These camps included Buon Mi Gia, Buon Sar Pa, Bu Prang, Ban Don and Buon Brieng.

At Camp Buon Sar Pa, 400 Montagnard rebels quickly seized control. The Montagnards killed eleven LLDBs troops at the camp. Captain Charles B. Darnell Jr. and his team were disarmed and held hostage in the team house. The strikers seized the nearby district headquarters at Dak Mil.

At Bu Prang southwest of Buon Sar Pa, three companies of the rebels seized the camp early in the morning. Fifteen LLDBs were killed. Later, seventeen Vietnamese Popular Forces were killed at a nearby checkpoint.

At Camp Buon Mi Ga located southeast of Ban Me Thuot, the rebels were organized into four companies about 614 rebels and advised by Captain Donald L. Loa’s detachment A-121A. The Montagnards killed ten Vietnamese Special Forces and disarmed Captain Loa’s team before leaving the Americans under guard as they took the trucks to drive to Ban Me Thuot. American helicopters arrived and CPT Loa and his team were allowed to leave the camp.

At Ban Don the rebels disarmed and tied up several LLDBs and several Americans were disarmed and put under guard.

The rebels controlled Highway 14, attacked Srépok post, then advanced to Buôn Ma Thuột, occupied the VTVN radio station, and called on the Montagnards to rise up against the South Vietnamese government to create an independent nation.

On 20 September 1964, General Nguyễn Phước Vĩnh Lộc, commander of Tactical Zone II, declared martial law in Buôn Ma Thuột, the 23rd Division, along with several commando and armored battalions, were mobilized to retake the radio station and other rebel-occupied outposts. Suddenly the US embassy advised Vĩnh Lộc to negotiate.

== Aftermath ==
Y Bhăm Êñuôl á representative of the moderate faction of FLHP, was invited to negotiate with the rebels. The results of the agreements:

- Y Bhăm Êñuôl was appointed as the official president of the FLHP movement. However, Y Bham Eñuol fled to Cambodia on the afternoon of 20 September.
- Rebel commanders were not prosecuted and were not pursued as they withdrew through Cambodia.

The uprising killed 36 South Vietnamese Special Forces and 17 South Vietnamese Popular Force, while an unknown number of the FLHP casualties.

== See also ==
- FULRO
- Degar State
