= Champa independence movement =

Initiatives to create an independent Champa

Flag of Front for the Liberation of Champa, which is often used to represent Champa's independence movement.

The Champa independence movement was an independence movement by members of the Cham people seeking secession from Vietnam. It primarily demanded the return of the former historical Champa states of the central and southern coast of Vietnam, sometimes including the Central Highlands who are indigenously similar to the Chams and due to their long historical ties with the Champa. According to international researchers, Cham separatism today and their notion of nationhood is almost non-existent.

== History ==
=== Before the 20th century ===
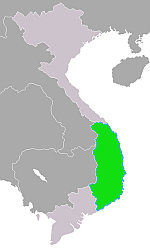
Map of Champa during its golden ages.

Champa was a collection of independent Cham polities that extended across the coast of what is today central and southern Vietnam from approximately the 2nd century AD until 1832 when it was annexed by the Vietnamese Empire under Minh Mạng. Once an independent kingdom, Champa had managed to develop its own culture that was strongly influenced from the Indian cultural zone, resulting with its own cultural heritages that separated them from the Sinic Vietnamese in the north, making Champa one of the most important parts of the Indic civilization sphere due to its strong Hindu remnants.

However, with the Vietnamese nation emerged after Chinese occupation, Champa and Đại Việt had engaged in a number of wars. The war series had slowly, but effectively crippled Champa as the country was unable to fend off both threat from the Khmer Empire in the west and the Vietnamese in the north. In order to rescue the country, the Chams adopted Islam as its religion from 15th century, but the Vietnamese conquest at 1471 finally put a de jure end of Champa as an independent state.

=== 20th century ===
Since then, the Chams rebelled a number of times against Vietnamese domination, with the most important rebellions occurring in the 19th century with the Katip Sumat uprising, the first and only jihadist war in Vietnamese history to date, and the Ja Thak Wa uprising. Both were crushed by the Vietnamese Empire.

In the 20th century, especially during the Vietnam War, the Chams rebelled for their independence, fighting against both North and South Vietnam, and later fought an insurgency against the unified communist government. The movement was initially spearheaded by the Front for the Liberation of Champa (FLC), and, after 1964, by the United Front for the Liberation of Oppressed Races (FULRO). All of these rebellions were eventually suppressed by the Vietnamese government, and the Cham population was significantly reduced.

=== 21st century ===
Sporadic protests and riots on a smaller scale still occur, and accusations of human rights violations by the government are common in minority areas. Neither the Cham nor the Vietnamese government want to disrupt the current balance.

== Arguments about Cham identity ==
=== Arguments in favor for independence ===
Cham advocacy groups argued that, as Champa had been an independent country until it was annexed as a Vietnamese territory in 1832, the Chams have the right to regain back what it had lost. Such advocacy groups have also criticized the Vietnamese government, accusing it of usurping history and denying the existence of Champa as a state and its systematic atrocities against the Chams.

Many Chams believed that the Vietnamese government would never allow any official researches over the Cham history in fear of possible uprising against Vietnamese rule by the Cham population. However, due to the small size of Cham population today, it often meets with strong counter-argument from the Vietnamese side.

Cham independence advocates often cite its war against Vietnamese expansionism as an example how Champa should be independent as it used to be.

=== Arguments against independence ===
According to Cham activists, the Vietnamese, regardless of political stances, have been strongly against any kind of independence movement by the Chams, and thus hostile to the Champa independence movement. This has never extended to racial relationship, however, as Vietnamese people, including many Overseas Vietnamese, are totally indifferent on their view with the Chams as a fellow people and unaware of historical discourses, according to Julie Thi Underhill.

Po Dharma, a major researcher of Champa's history, was critical to the Vietnamese government's treatment of the Chams, and believed that Vietnam should respect Cham heritage as Champa's history is often intertwined with Vietnamese history, if not a part of it.

Among all Vietnamese historical war accords, wars against Champa also take a popular feeling of pride among majority of Vietnamese and the conquest is highly venerated in the country.

Many Vietnamese also believe that if not for the conquest, Champa might have remained an underdeveloped country like Laos and Cambodia, and improvement could be seen under Vietnamese rule rather than Cham rule. Another popular Vietnamese narrative is, although Champa did not exist, but the Vietnamese government since modern days had tried to reconcile and research history of Champa as an entity and its own civilization, culture and customs, thus the Cham nationalist narrative of persecution is untrue.

=== Other opinions ===
In the Muslim world, where the Chams seemed to have a close bond due to religious conversion to Islam in 15th century, the persecution of Chams is little-known in the Muslim world. This is due to it being overlooked and due to strong Muslim sympathy to the Vietnamese during its war for independence from France. On the other hand, its Islamic conversion happens to be a huge disadvantage, due to the September 11 attacks which antagonized Muslims across the world may have further alienated Champa independence movement. This lack of awareness might have also contributed to the factor that Vietnam has never been targeted by Islamic extremists despite its maltreatment of Cham people.

In the United States, the Chams were considered to be ally during the Vietnam War, but the Americans' main objective was to help reinforcing Chams and South Vietnam into a common alliance against North Vietnam, which was never achieved due to historical antagonism of the two sides. Following the fall of South Vietnam and intensifying persecution, many Chams resettled in the United States and sought to revive and protect the Cham culture while dealing with a much larger and more populous Vietnamese American community that was not fond of Champa's independence movement either.

The Khmer Rouge was initially antagonistic to the Chams and committed mass atrocities against Chams, but due to the Cambodian–Vietnamese War, turned on and sought out the support of the Chams to fight the Vietnamese invasion.

== See also ==
- Human rights in Vietnam
