= FULRO insurgency =

Insurgency in North and South Vietnam

- Part of the Persecution of the Montagnard in Vietnam, racism in Vietnam, the Second & Third Indochina War, and Cold War
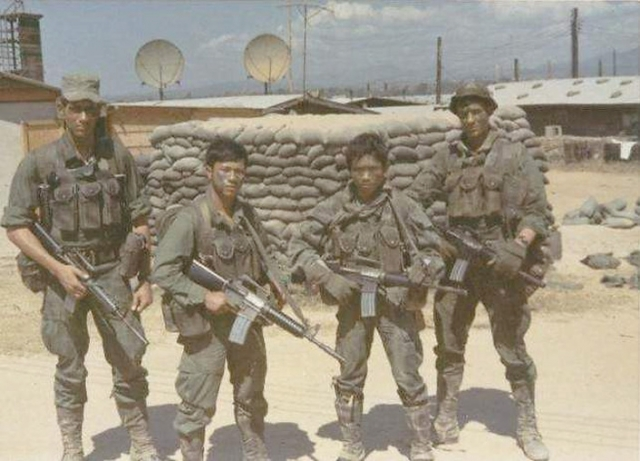
- Montagnard troops with U.S. Army soldiers during the Vietnam War.
Date	20 September 1964 – 10 October 1992 (28 years, 2 weeks and 6 days)
Location	Central Highlands (Vietnam), Mondulkiri (Cambodia)
Result	Vietnamese victory; Formation of Montagnard Foundation, Inc. and Degar State

Belligerents
FULRO: BAJARAKA; FLC; FLHP; FLKK; Arms supplies, training, intelligence and support in combatment: Kingdom of Cambodia; Khmer Republic (1970-1975); GRUNK; Khmer Rouge (after 1979); United States (1964–1975); France (1974–1992)	Communist forces: North Vietnam (1964–1976) (Provisional Revolutionary Government of the Republic of South Vietnam) Viet Cong (until 1975); Vietnam (after 1976); People's Republic of Kampuchea (1979–1989); State of Cambodia (1989–1992) Khmer Rouge (1967–1979)	Anti-communist forces: South Vietnam (1964–1975); United States (1964–1972)

Commanders and leaders
Y Bhăm Êñuôl (executed); Les Kosem # Po Dharma; Y Ghok Niê Krieng; Kok Ksor; Y Djao Niê; Ya Duck (POW); Huỳnh Ngọc Sắng; Trượng Thanh Duyên (POW); Sơn Ngọc Thành # Chau Dera; Son Sen Lon Nol (1970–1975) # (France) Georges Pompidou (France) Alain Poher (France) Valéry Giscard d'Estaing (France) François Mitterrand (France) Pierre Messmer (France) Jacques Chirac (France) Raymond Barre (France) Pierre Mauroy (France) Laurent Fabius (France) Michel Rocard (France) Édith Cresson (France) Pierre Bérégovoy	(North Vietnam) Ho Chi Minh # (North Vietnam) Lê Duẩn # (North Vietnam) Phạm Văn Đồng (North Vietnam) Võ Nguyên Giáp (North Vietnam) Van Tien Dung (North Vietnam) Lê Trọng Tấn # Đoàn Khuê; Phan Hoan (Provisional Revolutionary Government of the Republic of South Vietnam) Hoang Van Thai # (Provisional Revolutionary Government of the Republic of South Vietnam) Trần Văn Trà (Provisional Revolutionary Government of the Republic of South Vietnam) Nguyen Van Linh (Provisional Revolutionary Government of the Republic of South Vietnam) Nguyễn Hữu Thọ; Heng Samrin	(South Vietnam) Ngô Đình Diệm X (South Vietnam) Nguyễn Văn Thiệu (South Vietnam) Nguyễn Cao Kỳ (South Vietnam) Cao Văn Viên (South Vietnam) Vĩnh Lộc (South Vietnam) Nguyễn Hữu Có (South Vietnam) Lữ Mộng Lan; Lyndon B. Johnson; Richard Nixon; Robert McNamara; Clark Clifford

Casualties and losses
Unknown	Unknown	Unknown

The United Front for the Liberation of Oppressed Races (French: Front unifié de lutte des races opprimées, abbreviated FULRO) waged a nearly three decade long insurgency against the governments of North and South Vietnam, and later the unified Socialist Republic of Vietnam. The FULRO insurgents represented the interests of indigenous Muslim and Hindu Cham, Christian-majority Montagnards, and Theravada Buddhist Khmer Krom against the ethnic Kinh Vietnamese. They were supported and equipped by China and Cambodia according to those countries' interests in the Indochina wars.

== Background ==
The Muslim and Hindu Cham people were the remnants of the Kingdom of Champa settlers, which had been conquered by Đại Việt in a series of wars. The last remnant of the Champa state was conquered in 1832 by the expansionist Vietnamese emperor Minh Mạng. The Cham people under the leadership of the Muslim priest Katip Sumat who had returned from Kelantan declared a Jihad against Vietnam but the rebellion was eventually crushed. Ethnic Vietnamese colonists settled on Champa land where today they outnumber the native Cham.

The area of the Mekong Delta and Saigon formerly belonged to the Khmer Empire of Cambodia until its annexation by the Vietnamese Nguyễn lords who subsequently settled Vietnamese on the land, where they outnumber the native Khmer Krom.

The Montagnard peoples of the Central Highlands were mostly ignored by the Vietnamese until the French colonialists started to cultivate cash crops in the Central Highlands. The South Vietnamese government of Ngô Đình Diệm began a resettlement program to settle over a million ethnic North Vietnamese Catholic refugees, onto Montagnard lands in the Central Highlands, and the Montagnards opposed this. Montagnards began to protest in mass against the South Vietnamese government's colonialism in August 1958, but were harshly-handed by Ngô Đình Diệm's law enforcement forces; many Montagnard leaders were put into jails, such as Y Bhăm Êñuôl, Y Dhơn Adrong, Y Dhê Adrong, Y Nuin Hmok, Y Wick Buôn Ya, Y Het Kpor, Y Tluốp Kpor, Y Sênh Niê, Y Bun Sor, Y Yu Êban, Y Thih Êban, Touneh Yoh, Siu Síp, Paul Nưr, and Nay Luet. The government also orchestrated assimilation and discrimination policies over the Montagnards, together fueling more distrust and dissatisfaction toward the regime that grew exponential among indigenous communities.

=== Central Highlands ===
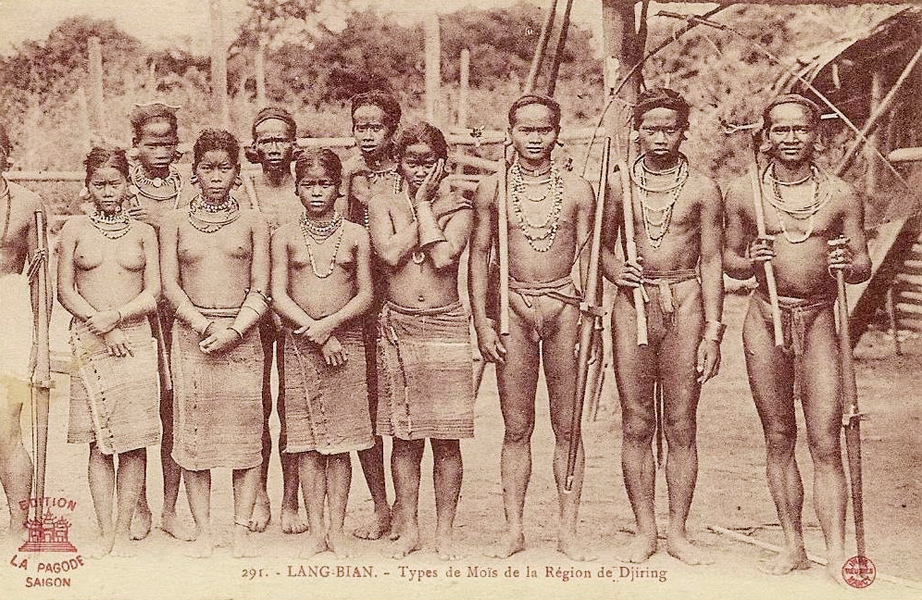
Indigenous peoples (Montagnards) in modern Lâm Đồng, Central Highlands in early 1900s.

The native inhabitants of the Central Highlands are the Montagnard peoples, which are themselves split among several ethnicities. Vietnam conquered and invaded the area during its "march to the south" (Nam tiến). Ethnic Vietnamese (Kinh) people eventually outnumbered the indigenous Montagnards after state sponsored colonization directed by both the government of South Vietnam and the current Communist government of unified Vietnam. The Montagnards have fought against and resisted the Viet colonists, from the anti-communist South Vietnamese government to the Viet Cong to the communist government of unified Vietnam.

The Champa state and Chams in the lowlands were traditional suzerains whom the Montagnards in the highlands acknowledged as their lords, while autonomy was held by the Montagnards. After World War II the concept of "Nam tiến" and the southward conquest was celebrated by Vietnamese scholars. The Pays Montagnard du Sud-Indochinois was the name of the Central Highlands from 1946 under French Indochina.

The French, Communist North Vietnam, and anti-Communist South Vietnam all exploited and persecuted the Montagnards in turn. All this discrimination made the Montagnards rebel against them several times.

Up until French rule, the Central Highlands was almost never entered by the Vietnamese because they viewed it as a savage (Moi-Montagnard) populated area with fierce animals like tigers, but the Vietnamese expressed interest in the land after the French transformed it into a profitable plantation area to grow crops on, in addition to the natural resources from the forests, minerals and rich earth, and realization of its crucial geographical importance.

An insurgency was waged by the Montagnards in FULRO against South Vietnam and then the unified Communist Vietnam. A colonization program of Kinh Vietnamese by the South Vietnamese government and united Vietnamese Communist government was implemented and now a Kinh with northern tribes majority predominates in the highland areas. The Montagnard lands in the Central Highlands were subjected to state sponsored colonization by ethnic Vietnamese settlers under the South Vietnamese regime of Ngô Đình Diệm which resulted in estranging the Montagnards and leading them to reject Vietnamese rule.

The South Vietnamese and Communist Vietnamese colonization of the Central Highlands has been compared to the historic Nam tiến of previous Vietnamese rulers. During the Nam tiến (March to the South) Khmer and Cham territory was seized and militarily colonized (đồn điền) by the Vietnamese, which was repeated by the state sponsored settlement of Northern Vietnamese Catholic refugees on Montagnard land by the South Vietnamese leader Diệm and the introduction to the Central Highlands of New Economic Zones by the Communist Vietnamese government. The South Vietnamese government was strongly against the autonomous Montagnard CIDG (Civilian Irregular Defense Groups) who were fighting against the Viet Cong because they feared that the Montagnards would gain independence. The South Vietnamese and Montagnards violently clashed. The Vietnamese Communists implemented harsh punishment against the Montagnards after the defeat of South Vietnam.

The Vietnamese viewed and dealt with the indigenous Montagnards in the CIDG from the Central Highlands as 'savages' and this caused a Montagnard uprising against the Vietnamese. The Rhade Montagnard mounted a revolt, seizing hundreds of Vietnamese civilians and soldiers, assassinating officers of the Vietnamese special forces and seizing American advisers on 19–20 September 1964, but the 23rd Division of the South Vietnamese army stopped them from seizing Ban Me Thout, the provincial capital of Darlac Province. In the Central Highlands the Montagnard FULRO organization fought against both the Communists and South Vietnamese due to discrimination by the South Vietnamese army against the Montagnards. After the victory of the Communist North Vietnamese, the Vietnamese refused autonomy to the Montagnards, and on Montagnard land they settled around one million ethnic Vietnamese in addition to using 're-education camps' on the Montagnards, leading the Montagnard FULRO to continue the armed struggle against the Vietnamese.

The Vietnamese were originally centered around the Red River Delta but engaged in conquest and seized new lands such as Champa, the Mekong Delta (from Cambodia) and the Central Highlands during Nam tiến, while the Vietnamese received strong Chinese influence in their culture and civilization and were Sinicized, and the Cambodians and Laotians were Indianized, the Montagnards in the Central Highlands maintained their own native culture without adopting external culture and were the true indigenous natives of the region, and to hinder encroachment on the Central Highlands by Vietnamese nationalists, the term Pays Montagnard du Sud-Indochinois PMSI emerged for the Central Highlands along with the natives being addressed by the name Montagnard. The tremendous scale of Vietnamese Kinh colonists flooding into the Central Highlands has significantly altered the demographics of the region. Violent demonstrations with fatalities have broken out due to Montagnard anger at Vietnamese discrimination and seizure of their land since many Vietnamese Kinh were settled by the government in the Central Highlands.

Long tails and excessive body hair were attributed as physical characteristics of Montagnards in Vietnamese school textbooks in the past. Ethnic minorities in general have also been referred to as "moi", including other "hill tribes" like the Muong. The anti-ethnic minority discriminatory policies by the Vietnamese, environmental degradation, deprivation of lands from the natives, and settlement of native lands by a massive number of Vietnamese settlers led to massive protests and demonstrations by the Central Highland's indigenous native ethnic minorities against the Vietnamese in January to February 2001 and this event gave a tremendous blow to the claim often published by the Vietnamese government that in Vietnam There has been no ethnic confrontation, no religious war, no ethnic conflict. And no elimination of one culture by another. The same state sponsored settlement of ethnic minority land by Vietnamese Kinh has happened in another highland region, the Annamite Cordillera (Trường Sơn), both the Central Highlands and Annamite Cordillera were populated by ethnic minorities who were not Vietnamese at the start of the 20th century, but the demographics of the highlands was drastically transformed with the mass colonization of 6 million settlers from 1976 to the 1990s, which led to ethnic Vietnamese Kinh outnumbering the native ethnic groups in the highlands.

Leaving out any plans for autonomy for ethnic minorities, an assimilation plan was launched by the South Vietnamese government with the creation of the Social and Economic Council for the Southern Highlander Country, the South Vietnamese based their approach to the highlanders by claiming that they would be "developed" since they were "poor" and "ignorant", making swidden agriculturalists sedentarize and settling ethnic Vietnamese colonists from the coastal regions into the highlands such as Northern Vietnamese Catholic refugees who fled to South Vietnam, 50,000 Vietnamese settlers were in the highlands in 1960 and in 1963 the total number of settlers was 200,000 and up to 1974 the South Vietnamese were still implemented the colonization plan even though the highlands natives experienced massive turbulence and disorder because of the colonization, and by 1971 less than half of a scheme backed by the Americans to leave Montagnards with just 20% of the Central Highlands was completed, and even in the parts of the highlands which did not experience colonization, the South Vietnamese threw the native tribes into 'strategic hamlets' to keep them away from places where communists potentially operated and the South Vietnamese consistently spurned any attempts to make overtures to the native highlanders.

== History ==
=== Early start ===
A colonization program of Kinh Vietnamese by the South Vietnamese government and united Vietnamese Communist government was implemented. The South Vietnamese and Communist Vietnamese colonization of the Central Highlands have been compared to the historic Nam tiến of previous Vietnamese rulers. During the Nam tiến (March to the South) Khmer and Champanterritory was seized and militarily colonized (đồn điền) by the Vietnamese which was repeated by the state sponsored colonization of Northern Vietnamese Catholic refugees on Montagnard land by the South Vietnamese government and the introduction to the Central Highlands of New Economic Zones by the now Communist Vietnamese government.

The Chinese, Central Highlands Montagnards, Cham, and Delta Cambodians (Khmer Krom) were all alienated by the South Vietnamese government under Diệm. The Montagnards were subjected to colonization with ethnic Vietnamese by Diệm. A complete rejection of Vietnamese rule was felt by non-NLF tribes of the Montagnards in 1963.

The Chinese, Khmer, and Chams were discriminated against by the South Vietnamese government, although the government treated Montagnards even worse than the three previous ethnicities, causing Montagnards to revolt again by going as far as to treat an entire Montagnard village as expendable pawn. The South Vietnamese and the NLF (Việt Cộng) assaulted the refugee camps inhabited by Montagnards in Đà Lạt during the Tet offensive. In the Central Highlands, Montagnard land was subjected to an attempted seizure by the South Vietnamese Madame Nguyễn Cao Kỳ in 1971. 9 Montagnards and 3 Chinese were elected to South Vietnam's constitutional assembly after pressure was implemented on the government.

Y Bhăm Êñuôl brought FULRO to the fore in 1965 while anti-South Vietnamese propaganda was directed towards CIDG troops by FULRO leaflets attacking the Saigon regime and applauding Cambodia for its support since Prince Norodom Sihanouk launched the Indochinese People's conference in March 1963 with Y Bhăm Êñuôl to shed light on the Montagnard situation.

The highlanders leader Y Bhăm Êñuôl, Cham leader Les Kosem, and Cambodian leader Sihanouk were all photographed together at the meeting where they declared their war against the South Vietnamese and America in the name of the Khmer, Cham, and Montagnards.

Y Bhăm Êñuôl achieved control in 1965 and CIDG members were urged by FULRO to defect while the South Vietnamese authorities were attacked by FULRO which commended Cambodia under Prince Norodom Sihanouk, who promoted the Indochinese People's Conference at Phnom Penh in 1963 which was attended by Y Bhăm Êñuôl.

The threatening secessionist group FULRO founded in the 1960s in South Vietnam by the tribes of the highlands ethnic minorities. Adjacent to Vietnam, the Cambodian forests were exploited as a base by FULRO fighters battling the Democratic Republic of Vietnam, especially in Mondulkiri province.

The FULRO Highlanders, Khmer Krom, and Cham fighters were backed by Sihanouk against the South Vietnamese and challenged the Việt Cộng for control calling the Americans as 'imperialists' and launching an anti-South Vietnamese uprising while at the same time viewing the Việt Cộng as an enemy. The US Special Forces and Sihanouk backed the FULRO Montagnard fighters who were fighting against the South Vietnamese government.

The Montagnards inhabited Central Highlands became open to the Vietnamese only under French rule. The word savage (moi) was used by the Vietnamese against the Montagnards. Both the South Vietnamese and the united Communist Vietnam government were fought against by the FULRO Montagnard fighters for the sake of the Central Highlands and Montagnard peoples under the direction of Y Bhăm Êñuôl. The war lead to the deaths of 200,000 Montagnards. Montagnards courts were abolished by South Vietnam and the Central Highlands became flooded with Vietnamese colonizers under the direction of South Vietnam. Torture and mass arrests by the Vietnamese military were used in the Central Highlands against the Montagnards during the February 2001 protests against Vietnamese oppression. A report on Vietnamese oppression of Montagnards was issued by Human Rights Watch titled "Repression of Montagnards: Conflicts Over Land and Religion in Vietnam's Central Highlands".

The lowlander Vietnamese seized Montagnard lands, attacked their culture and language, and massacred the Montagnards due to their hatred against them and their distinct religion, culture, language, and ethnicity (Austronesian) marks them apart to the Vietnamese. They were referred to as savage "moi" by the Vietnamese. The Vietnamese persecuted them for hundreds of years. They were known to be very skilled at tracking and hunting targets. The area was under French rule when the highlands were first targeted for Vietnamese settlement. Prior to the division the earlier unified Vietnam had abused and mistreated the Montagnards so South Vietnamese and North Vietnamese alike were targeted and hated by the Montagnards during the war due to the discrimination and racism against the Montagnards at the hands of the Vietnamese.

=== Uprising ===
In 1958, the Central Highlands was a scene of a revolt by the native tribals against assimilation and colonization of the land by the Vietnamese implemented by the South Vietnamese government. Neither the National Liberation Front (Việt Cộng) nor South Vietnamese were on the side of FULRO which Prince Sihanouk supported after its founding in 1964 from a union of multiple highlander tribals. The war led to the deaths of a massive number of the tribal natives due to the fighting which went on throughout the highlands.

The new changes to the economy and living in the Central Highlands provoked the native tribals to started FULRO to resist the South Vietnamese with the aid of Sihanouk. Y Bhăm Êñuôl established FULRO whose sole common bond and ideology was anti-Vietnamese sentiment, with questionable allegiance to anything else, created in 1964, based in Ratanakiri and Mondulkiri provinces in Cambodia and the Central Highlands in Vietnam of the local mountaineers.

The Việt Cộng and Cambodia approached FULRO after its foundation. The Cambodian Prince Norodom Sihanouk backed the creation of FULRO which was formed out of a united alliance of South Vietnam's different hill tribal peoples. The South Vietnamese oppression of the highlanders caused the creation of FULRO and it operated from Cambodia with support by Sihanouk in order to resist the oppression, two provincial capitals were seized by FULRO in December 1965 and FULRO forced the South Vietnam to grant concessions.

There was long-established animosity between the mountain tribesman and lowland Vietnamese. Montagnards fought against South Vietnamese soldiers in Pleiku, Daklak, and Quang Quc. The Tribal mountain peoples united in FULRO launched uprisings in Daklak and Lac Thin. Phu Tien came under Montagnard rule after they inflicted heavy losses on South Vietnamese soldiers, rising in rebellion in Phu Bon and battling South Vietnamese soldiers. Representation and an autonomous political entity were among the dictations stated as their goals by FULRO against South Vietnam. During the uprising, anti-government Rhade Montagnard insurgents from CIDG slaughtered South Vietnamese troops and seized American soldiers as prisoners, after the uprising some of the Montagnards joined the Montagnard separatist movement FULRO led by Y Bhăm Êñuôl in Cambodia. The Montagnards received Prince Sihanouk and Cham support and were not connected to the Việt Cộng.

The instigation for the uprising is believed in some quarters to have originated from Cambodia (Phnom Penh) where tribal heads against the Vietnamese had congregated before the FULRO uprising on 20 September 1964 at Buôn Ma Thuột. The state goal was 'liberation' from oppression suffered by minorities at the hands of South Vietnam and the Montagnards, Chams, and Khmers were all asserted to be spoken for by FULRO.

The South Vietnamese government in Saigon sent a diplomatic contingent in August 1968 to Buôn Ma Thuột to negotiate with FULRO representatives including Y Bhăm Êñuôl after a promise of safe conduct was given to him by Trần Văn Hương, the Prime Minister of South Vietnam, after FULRO members at Camp Le Rolland agreed to negotiate since South Vietnam was no longer the top priority for Cambodia because the Khmer Rouge was starting to distract Sihanouk in 1968.

Montagnard women were abused (tortured) at the hands of Việt Cộng forces.

The Cambodian Cham Les Kosem, a Lieutenant Colonel, was responsible for matters relating to ethnic minorities under Sihanouk and both Kosem and Sihanouk were aware of FULRO.

The three stripes on the flag of FULRO represented the unification of the Struggle Front of the Khmer of Lower Cambodia, the Front for the Liberation of Champa, and BAJARAKA movements after Y Dhơn Adrong was convinced to join them together by Cham leader Les Kosem during the Montagnard uprising against South Vietnam.

While in Cambodia at FULRO headquarters, Y Bhăm Êñuôl had his family moved into Mondulkiri's Krechea via Vietnam's Daklak and Ban Don areas.

South Vietnamese government of Trường Sơn, led by Barry Peterson, was furious when Y Preh, a FULRO member, wanted to meet him, because contact was prohibited with the rebels fighting against South Vietnam. After the Montagnard uprising against South Vietnam, 10 months passed before FULRO agreed to negotiate with South Vietnam.

After Colonel Freund agreed to capitulate and turn over a base to the South Vietnamese, the Montagnards in the Buon Sarpa unit were greatly displeased and discontent. In Mondulkiri forests, Sihanouk's Cambodia Royal Khmer Army officers Um Savuth and Cham ethnic Les Kosem discussed with Bajaraka Montagnard members where Les Kosem initiated the amalgamation and foundation of FULRO.

In 1950s, BAJARAKA movement came before FULRO which was its successor. An uprising against the South Vietnamese was planned with the cooperation of Front for the Liberation of Champa, struggle Front of the Khmer Krom of Lower Cambodia, and a Rhade official. While the BAJARAKA movement founded, it is believed that parallel to it the establishment of the Front for the Liberation of Champa took place. FULRO documents contained the signatures of and FULRO meetings were attended by members of Front for the Liberation of Champa. A Cham goddess's name was used as a call sign by Les Kosem. The FULRO organizations was backed by Prince Sihanouk of Cambodia, anti-Vietnamese, and anti-American Frenchmen, it was attempted to be used against the Việt Cộng's NFL by the Americans due to their animosity towards Vietnamese.

The Front de libération du Kampuchea Nord, the Front de libération du Kampuchea Krom, the Front de libération du Champa formed FULRO in 1964 after the Khmer Krom, the PMS minorities (Montagnards), and both Vietnam and Cambodian Cham joined in unity together to fight the Vietnamese.

The 5th BIs Special Infantry Brigade Fr: Brigade d'Infanterie Spéciale, was made out of Cham Muslims and Khmer-Malay Muslims by some ex-FULRO South Vietnam Phanrang and Phanri born Cham, and "Khmer Islam" (Cambodian Cham Muslims and Chvea) under the rule of Lon Nol and minority affairs in Cambodia were delegated to the Cham Les Kosem.

In 1960s, separatist organizations in South Vietnam were joined in a coalition called FULRO which included under the direction of Cambodian Cham Les Kosem, the Front for the Liberation of Champa which was founded in 1962 by Cham state in Vietnam. The Central Highlands were the scene of ethnic minorities forming separatist movements.

In 1963, the Khmer Serei movement was started against the Saigon government by Norodom Sihanouk's government. The Malayo-Polynesian and Mon-Khmer ethnic minorities who were against the South Vietnamese Saigon government joined in September 1964 such as the Cambodian government support "Front de Libération du Champa". With the separatist movements were encouraged to seek independence as the Khmer government backed FULRO at the Indochinese People's conference. After overthrowing pro-China Sihanouk, Cambodian leader Lon Nol, despite being anti-Communist and ostensibly in the 'pro-American' camp, backed FULRO against all Vietnamese, both anti-communist South Vietnam and the Communist Việt Cộng. Lon Nol planned a slaughter of all Vietnamese in Cambodia and a restoration of South Vietnam to a revived Champa state. Vietnamese were slaughtered and dumped in the Mekong River at the hands of Lon Nol's anti-Communist forces. The Khmer Rouge later imitated Lon Nol's actions. Lon Nol backed FULRO hill tribes, and in South Vietnam and Cambodia's frontier region he fought a proxy war against the NLF via Khmer Krom detachments as he desired to emulate Van Pao.

The settlement of ethnic Vietnamese from densely populated areas to relieve the financial pressure on those areas on the lands of the tribals in the Central Highlands was sponsored by the Vietnamese government and it led to the creation of FULRO to resist the Vietnamese. A 'liberated area' served as the base for the chiefs of FULRO, making their goals unclear, being an organization founded by Montagnards, Cham, and Khmer Krom and mounted an uprising against South Vietnam as they operated in Cambodia near Daklak in the Central Highlands.

Kuno Knöbl tried to discuss FULRO with the Pleiku-based Special Forces Captain Schwikar who refused to talk about it. FULRO helped toppled the South Vietnamese government. The Vietnamese Communists used airplanes to bomb FULRO fighters as they revolted against the 're-education', economic policies and other policies which affected their way of life which were implemented by the Vietnamese Communists. With Cambodian backing, Montagnard FULRO fighters fought against the Vietnamese Communist government of unified Vietnam until 1992.

==== Vietnamese colonization ====
A colonization program of Kinh Vietnamese by the South Vietnamese government and united Vietnamese Communist government was implemented. Leaving out any plans for autonomy for ethnic minorities, an assimilation plan was launched by the South Vietnamese government with the creation of the Social and Economic Council for the Southern Highlander Country, the South Vietnamese based their approach to the highlanders by claiming that they would be 'developed' since they were 'poor' and 'ignorant', making swidden agriculturalists sedentarize and settling ethnic Vietnamese colonists from the coastal regions into the highlands such as Northern Vietnamese Catholic refugees who fled to South Vietnam, 50,000 Vietnamese settlers were in the highlands in 1960 and in 1963 the total number of settlers was 200,000 and up to 1974 the South Vietnamese were still implemented the colonization plan even though the highland natives experienced massive turbulence and disorder because of the colonization, and by 1971 less than half of a scheme back by the Americans to leave Montagnards with just 20% of the Central Highlands was completed, and even in the parts of the highlands which did not experience colonization, the South Vietnamese threw the native tribes into 'strategic hamelets' to keep them away from places where communists potentially operated and the South Vietnamese consistently spurned any attempts too make overtures to the native highlanders.

The South Vietnamese government made only symbolic, useless concessions to ethnic minorities in order to stop FULRO from gaining support. FULRO tribals rose up in an uprising against South Vietnamese colonization of the Central Highlands with ethnic Vietnamese settlers.

In 1955, the Central Highlands were flooded with Northern Vietnamese migrants after the autonomous Montagnard area was abolished by Ngô Đình Diệm. Y Bhăm Êñuôl founded BAJARAKA on 5 January 1958, to resist the discrimination, Vietnamese settlement on highlands and forced assimilation by the South Vietnamese government. The United Nations Secretary General and foreign embassies were contacted by Y Bhăm Êñuôl. Front for the Liberation of the Highlands of Champa (Mặt Trận Giải Phóng Cao Nguyên Champa) and BAJARAKA were both headed by Y Bhăm Êñuôl. He was killed by the Khmer Rouge on 20 April 1975. Les Kosem, Y Bham Enuol, and Prince Norodom Sihanouk worked together to found FULRO and launch an uprising against the South Vietnamese government to regain their land from the Vietnamese colonizers. Vietnam is still persecuting the religion and culture of the natives who live in poverty and are losing their land to ethnic Vietnamese settlers who continue to flood into their land in the Central Highlands in Vietnam today.

An uprising against South Vietnam was launched by BAJARAKA head Y Bhăm Êñuôl with Mnong and Rhade Montagnard soldiers who seized American Special Forces and some Vietnamese as prisoners in their CIDG bases after seizing a Buôn Ma Thuột based radio station and inflicting 70 deaths upon the Vietnamese when taking over Darlac CIDG bases with 3,000 troops on 19 September 1964. Prince Sihanouk's administration in Cambodia guided FULRO with anti-SEATO, anti-American ideology and in 1965 FULRO released maps showing that their ultimate goal was for Montagnard and Cham independence within a revived new Champa state and for Khmers to retake Cochinchina, corroborating the statement Notre but est de défendre notre survie et notre patrimoine culturel, spirituel et racial, et ainsi l'Indépendance de nos Pays, which was found in their declaration which also claimed that ethnic minorities were being subjected to genocide at the hands of the South Vietnamese, calling for the Montagnards, Khmer Krom, and Cham to unity in FULRO under the direction of their Haut Comité on 20 September 1964. CIDG bases where the rank and file were found while it was in Cambodia where the chiefs of FULRO were based and from where the FULRO Montagnard, Cham, and Khmer Krom chiefs directed the uprising.

Concessions for ethnic minority rights were issued after the South Vietnamese government was forced by the FULRO insurgency to address the problem under Front for the Liberation of the Highlands of Champa (Mặt Trận Giải Phóng Cao Nguyên Champa) and FULRO led by Les Kosem and with the help of the intelligence agency and military of Cambodia under Prince Norodom Sihanouk. The effort to free the Cham people was led by Major General Les Kosem. The Cham people keep the soul of FULRO alive according to former FULRO Cham member Po Dharma who went a journey to see Les Kosem's grave.

Quảng Văn Đủ was the legal registered name of the Cham Po Dharma. He stood against ethnic Kinh Vietnamese bullies for his fellow Cham while he was in school and helped spread Cham nationalist ideas against the South Vietnamese. He became a member of FULRO and attended a FULRO training camp in Cambodia and fought in Mondulkiri. While in Cambodia he attacked the North Vietnamese and South Vietnamese embassies and then he fought against Vietnamese Communists. After being wounded in battle he quit his military career after seeking the permission of Les Kosem himself and went to France to be educated and serve FULRO in a civilian capacity.

A colonization settlement program of indigenous people's land in the Central Highlands with Vietnamese soldiers and colonists was implemented by South Vietnamese leader Ngô Đình Diệm starting in 1955. The Central Highlander Liberation Front was founded in 1955 during a meeting of indigenous highlands who had originally rallied to the Rhade Y Thih Êban against the South Vietnamese government. In 1960, in Phnom Penh the foundation of the Les Kosem led Champa Liberation Front and Kampuchea Krom Liberation Front happened to fight against South Vietnamese colonization.

FULRO tried to create a sovereign and self-governing Central Highlands through insurgency against the South Vietnamese for a decade while based in Cambodia's Mondulkiri province with support from Prime Minister Lon Nol of Cambodia, led by Cham Lieutenant Major Les Kosem and Rhade leader Y Bhăm Êñuôl but when the Khmer Rouge came to power, they attacked FULRO. Les Kosem fled the country while the French embassy sheltered other FULRO leaders, however diplomatic immunity was violated when the FULRO leaders were seized and killed by the Khmer Rouge after storming the embassy. The North Vietnamese and Khmer Rouge effectively ended FULRO however elements of FULRO still survived and decided to wage war against the new Communist Vietnamese government of unified Vietnam as they had against the South Vietnamese. FULRO received support from China and Cambodian elements against Vietnam. The Vietnamese invasion of Cambodia was fought against by Dega FULRO remnants.

=== Post-unification of Vietnam ===
Despite the FULRO's neutral stance with North Vietnam and even collaborated with the North Vietnamese Army during the battle of Ban Me Thuot in 1975 against the South Vietnamese army which resulted in a decisive NVA victory and subsequent collapse of South Vietnam military in April 1975, relation between them never maintained close. After the war, the North Vietnamese leadership failed to keep the promises they made with the indigenous Montagnard tribes in 1960, but reinvigorated Vietnamese colonization of the Central Highlands. Frustrated with these grievances, the anticommunist faction of the FULRO reportedly negotiated an arrangement with US officials to continue waging guerrilla warfare against the Hanoi government after the fall of South Vietnam.

In the novel For the Sake of All Living Things it was noted that both anti-Communist and Communist, Vietnamese in general were fought against by the FULRO mountaineers in the highlands.

Y Bhăm Êñuôl, the chief of FULRO along with 150 other members hid in the French embassy when the Khmer Rouge took over Phnom Penh, however the Khmer Rouge forced the French consul to surrender them all to their custody and had them killed. The anti-South Vietnam, and anti-Communist Vietnam FULRO which fought both the South Vietnamese and the Communist Vietnamese, was given aid and assistance by China via Thailand to fight against the Vietnamese throughout the 1970s and 1980s while China also backed ethnic minorities in northern Vietnam along the border against the Vietnamese.

China backed the Central Highlands-based FULRO Koho, Rhade, Jarai, and Bahnar fighters to battle the Vietnamese PAVN in the provinces of Daklak, Kon Tum, and Gai Lai where Vietnamese military and police stations were assaulted by the fighters.

China, North Vietnam ethnic minorities, the FULRO Montagnards, right wing Laotians, Prince Sihanouk, right wing Cambodians under Son Sann, and the Thai were all anti-Communist groups contacted by Trương Như Tảng who was a member of the Committee for National Salvation which was against the Communist Vietnamese government.

The FULRO Montagnard fighters received military materials from China in 1980.

The Trotskyist Fourth International (post-reunification) run Inprecor and Intercontinental Press claimed that the CIA and French were the ones who started FULRO as it attacked Prince Sihanouk and China for their efforts to support FULRO against Vietnam.

Anti-Vietnamese Laotian organizations and FULRO along with Cambodian (Khmer) organizations were backed by China.

The culture of the Montagnards was targeted for extermination by the Vietnamese and there were centuries of warfare between the Vietnamese and Montagnards. Assault rifles, carbines, rockets, grenades, and ammunition were among the weapons the remaining Montagnard FULRO fighters had in their possession when they gave up the struggle and turned them over to the United Nations in 1992.

FULRO fighters in the jungles of Mondulkiri who were fighting against the Vietnamese were interviewed in 1992 by Nate Thayer.

==== Other minority resistance groups ====
FULRO was backed by China. The fierce insurgency against the Vietnamese Communist government of unified Vietnam by FULRO involved 12,000 fighters in the Central Highlands. Vietnamese government workers were attacked in their offices and houses by guerrilla detachments of FULRO fighters originating from Cambodia and mountain regions.

The Central Highlands had a secret route via Cambodia to China where FULRO fighters were given Chinese aid and help through weapons and cash. In the provinces of Daklak, Kon Tum, and Gai Lai, Vietnamese garrisons of soldiers and police were assaulted by the Koho, Rhade, Jarai, and Bahnar FULRO fighters.

Anti North-Vietnam Laotian Hmong rebels and the anti-South Vietnamese FULRO both received support from China and Thailand to fight against the Communist government of unified Vietnam. There was high mobility among ethnic minorities like the Hmong, Yao, Nung, and Tai across the border between China and Vietnam.

At the Laotian border Hmong insurgents backed by China fought. After the United States stopped aiding the Hmong, the Chinese assistance was sought by the Hmong fighters.

In Phongsaly province of Laos, Meo (Hmong) fighters were backed by the Chinese against the Laotian government which was an ally of Vietnam. Zao, Lu, and Khmu ethnic minorities were also backed in Phou Bia against the Vietnamese by China. The Vietnamese executed any members of its ethnic minorities along the border with China who worked for the Chinese.

Aid and assistance came from China via Kunming in Yunnan to anti-Vietnamese organizations in Laos, Cambodia (Kampuchea) and FULRO in Vietnam to form a united coalition against Vietnam.

In the northeast area of Cambodia raids were conducted by combined FULRO forces and Cambodian guerrillas fighting against Vietnam from Preah Vihear. Laos and Cambodia (Kampuchea) based anti-Vietnamese organizations were conduits of support from China to a FULRO like group which was founded and made out of "hill peoples" from Laos and Cambodia. Laotian and Cambodian organizations fighting against the Vietnamese were a transit point via which Chinese support reached FULRO like organizations.

=== Post-insurgency ===
The Vietnamese government was reported to be persecuting Montagnards and accusing them of being FULRO members as late as 2012 and blaming FULRO for the 2004 and 2001 riots against Vietnamese rule in the Central Highlands. The United States under President Barack Obama, because of its anti-China policy and trying to lure Vietnam as an ally to the US against China, has been accused of deliberately ignoring this.

Luke Simpkins, an MP in the House of Representatives of Australia condemned the Vietnamese persecution of the Central Highland Montagnards and noting both the South Vietnamese government and regime of unified Communist Vietnam attacked the Montagnards and colonized their lands, mentioning FULRO which fought against the Vietnamese and the desire for the Montagnards to preserve their culture and language.

The situation of the Cham people compared to the ethnic Vietnamese is substandard, lacking water and electricity and many live in poor housing.

=== Khmer Krom ===
Chau Dera, a Buddhist monk, founded the Khmer Krom movement Struggle Front of the Khmer of Kampuchea Krom. FULRO was created by the unification of Montagnard BAJARAKA with the Struggle Front of the Khmer of Kampuchea Krom and Front for the Liberation of Champa in 1964.
