= Third Indochina War =

1978–1991 conflict in Indochina

- Part of the Indochina wars and the Sino-Soviet split
| Date | 25 December 1978 – 23 October 1991 (12 years, 9 months and 4 weeks) |
| Location | Vietnam, Cambodia, China, with spillovers in Laos and Thailand |
| Result | 1991 Paris Peace Accords |

Belligerents
| China; Khmer Rouge: Democratic Kampuchea (until 1979); CPK (until 1981); CGDK (from 1982): Khmer Rouge; FUNCINPEC; KPNLF; Thailand Arms supplies, training, or financial aid: List: Canada; Malaysia; North Korea; Romania; Singapore; United Kingdom; United States; Lao royalists Hmong insurgents FULRO | Vietnam; People's Republic of Kampuchea (until 1989); State of Cambodia (from 1989); Laos Arms supplies, training, or financial aid: List: Albania; Bulgaria; Cuba; Czechoslovakia; East Germany; Derg (until 1987); People's Democratic Republic of Ethiopia (from 1987); Grenada (until 1983); Hungary; India; Mongolia; Nicaragua; Poland; South Yemen; Soviet Union; Communist Party of Thailand; Malayan Communist Party |

Commanders and leaders
| Hua Guofeng; Deng Xiaoping; Ye Jianying; Xu Xiangqian; Zhang Aiping; Yang Dezhi; Xu Shiyou; Pol Pot; Khieu Samphan; Ieng Sary; Son Sen; Ta Mok; Son Sann; Dien Del; Norodom Sihanouk; Kriangsak Chamanan | Lê Duẩn; Trường Chinh; Nguyễn Văn Linh; Võ Nguyên Giáp; Lê Trọng Tấn; Văn Tiến Dũng; Lê Đức Anh; Vũ Lập; Đàm Quang Trung; Phạm Văn Trà; Lê Khả Phiêu; Đoàn Khuê; Hoàng Cầm; Nguyễn Hữu An; Heng Samrin; Hun Sen; Chea Sim; Pen Sovan; Chan Sy; Tea Banh; Souphanouvong; Kaysone Phomvihane; Khamtai Siphandone |

Casualties and losses
| Khmer Rouge (1975-1978): 30,000+ killed (Note: in Xung đột biên giới Việt Nam–Campuchia , Vietnam Wikipedia.); Khmer Rouge (1978-1989): 100,000+ killed (Note: This phase of the Cambodian-Vietnamese War saw intense mobilization on both sides.); China (1979): 20,000–62,000+ killed or wounded (Note: in Sino-Vietnamese War); China (1979-1991): Ten of thousands killed or wounded. (Note: in Sino-Vietnamese conflicts (1979–1991)); Thailand (Thai-Laotian Border War) (1987–1988): 147 soldiers killed 400–770+ soldiers wounded (Note: in Thai–Laotian Border War); Thailand (Vietnamese border raids in Thailand) (1979-1989): 422+ soldiers killed (Note: in Vietnamese border raids in Thailand); Hmong insurgents: 40,000-100,000+ killed (Note: in Insurgency in Laos, the Insurgency in Laos is considered a regional conflict and component of the Third Indochina War) | Vietnam (1975-1991): 105,627 military killed Thai–Laotian Border War (1987–1988): 286 soldiers killed 200–300+ soldiers wounded (Note: in Thai–Laotian Border War) |

The Third Indochina War was a series of interconnected military conflicts among the various communist factions over strategic influence in mainland Southeast Asia after communist victory in South Vietnam, Laos, and Cambodia in 1975. The conflict primarily started due to continued raids and incursions by the Khmer Rouge into Vietnamese territory that they sought to retake. These incursions would result in the Cambodian–Vietnamese War in which the newly unified Vietnam overthrew the Pol Pot regime and the Khmer Rouge, in turn ending the Cambodian genocide. Vietnam had installed a government led by many opponents of Pol Pot, most notably Hun Sen, a former Khmer Rouge commander. This led to Vietnam's occupation of Cambodia for over a decade. The Vietnamese push to completely destroy the Khmer Rouge led to them conducting border raids in Thailand against those who had provided sanctuary.

Vietnam-China relations became tense because Vietnam chose to be pro-Soviet after unification in 1976 instead of being neutral as before. China strongly objected to the invasion of Cambodia. Chinese armed forces launched a punitive operation (Sino-Vietnamese War) in February 1979 and attacked Vietnam's northern provinces, determined to contain Soviet/Vietnamese influence and prevent territorial gains in the region.

In order to acquire full control over Cambodia the People's Army of Vietnam needed to dislodge the remaining Khmer Rouge leaders and units, which had retreated to the remote areas along the Thai-Cambodian border. Vietnam became bogged down in the battlefield and isolated from the international community except for the support of the Soviet Union and its allies. Meanwhile, Vietnam and its native ally also faced opposition of other factions and an anti-Vietnamese coalition government was formed in 1982. After the Paris Peace Conference in 1989, the PAVN completely withdrew from Cambodian territory in deadlock. Finally regular troop engagements in the region ended after the conclusion of the 1991 Paris Peace Accords, leading to a transitional process and the restoration of a multi-party constitutional monarchy in 1993.

In Laos, an insurgency is still ongoing, though to a lesser extent since 2007, with the government being supported by both China and Vietnam.

== Background ==
=== Soviet-Chinese discord ===
After Joseph Stalin's death in 1953, Nikita Khrushchev became leader of the Soviet Union. His denouncement of Stalin and his purges, the introduction of more moderate communist policies and foreign policy of peaceful coexistence with the West angered China's leadership. Mao Zedong had been following a strict Stalinist course, that insisted on the cult of personality as a unifying force of the nation. Disagreements over technical assistance for developing China's nuclear weapons and basic economic policies further alienated the Soviets and the Chinese as opposing forces of communist influence across the globe. As decolonization movements began to pick up speed in the 1960s and many such countries descended into violence, both of the communist powers competed for political control of the various nations or competing factions in ongoing civil war fights. Ever more diverging Chinese and Soviet strategic and political doctrines had increased the Sino-Soviet split of the mid-1950s.

=== Political developments during the Vietnam War ===
The Democratic Republic of Vietnam (North Vietnam), which had chosen to ally with the USSR, justified incursions into neighbouring Laos and Cambodia during the Second Indochinese War by reference to the international nature of communist revolution, where "Indochina is a single strategic unit, a single battlefield" and the Vietnam People's Army's pivotal role in bringing this about. However, this internationalism was obstructed by complicated regional historical realities, such as the "timeless oppositions between the Chinese and the Vietnamese on the one hand and the Vietnamese and the Khmers on the other". North Vietnam intervened in the civil war between the Royal Lao Army and the communist Pathet Lao until the establishment of the Lao People's Democratic Republic and the "Treaty of Friendship and Cooperation" signed in July 1977. Permanently stationed North Vietnamese troops secured and maintained vital supply routes and strategic staging sites (Ho Chi Minh trail). From 1958 on, Northern and Southern Vietnamese combat troops also began to infiltrate the remote jungles of eastern Cambodia where they continued the Ho Chi Minh trail. The Cambodian communist insurgents had joined these sanctuaries during the late 1960s. Although co-operation took place, the Khmer communists did not adopt modern socialist doctrines and eventually allied with China.

The complete American withdrawal instantaneously eliminated the principal and common adversary of all the communist powers. The communist regimes of Cambodia, Vietnam and Laos pledged allegiance with one of these two opposing factions.

== Cambodian-Vietnamese war ==
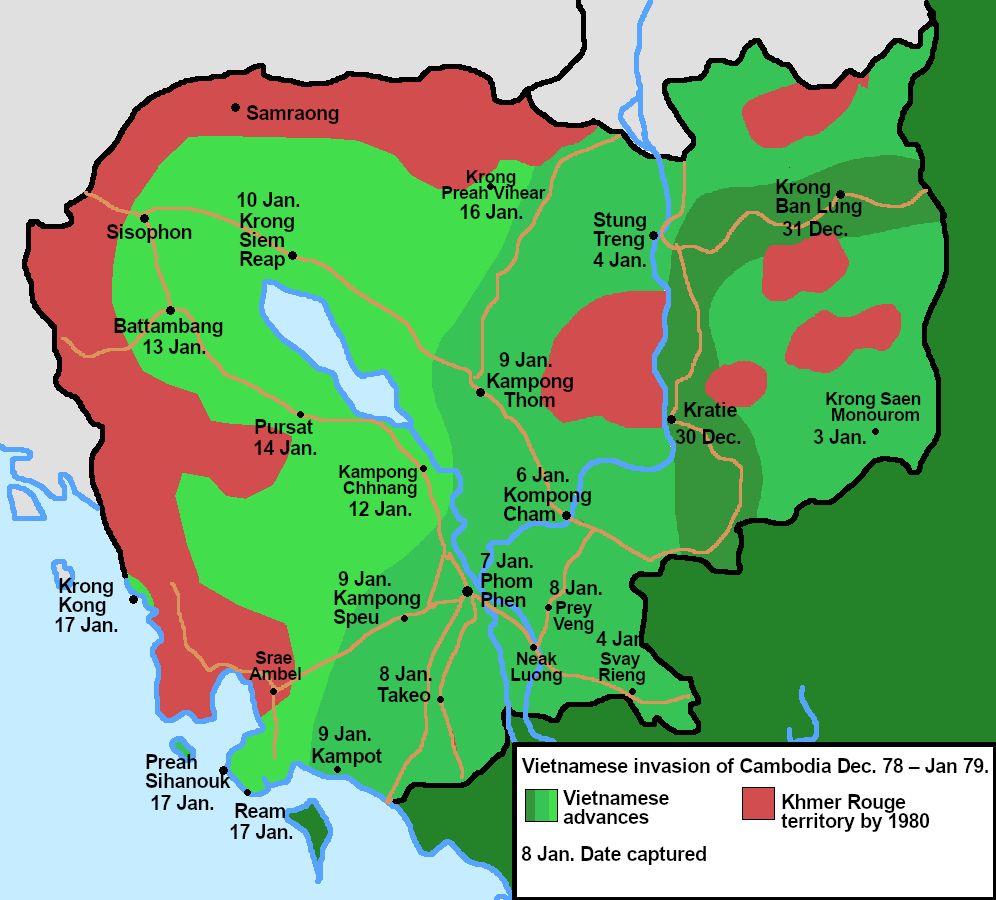
Map of the Vietnamese advances in 1979

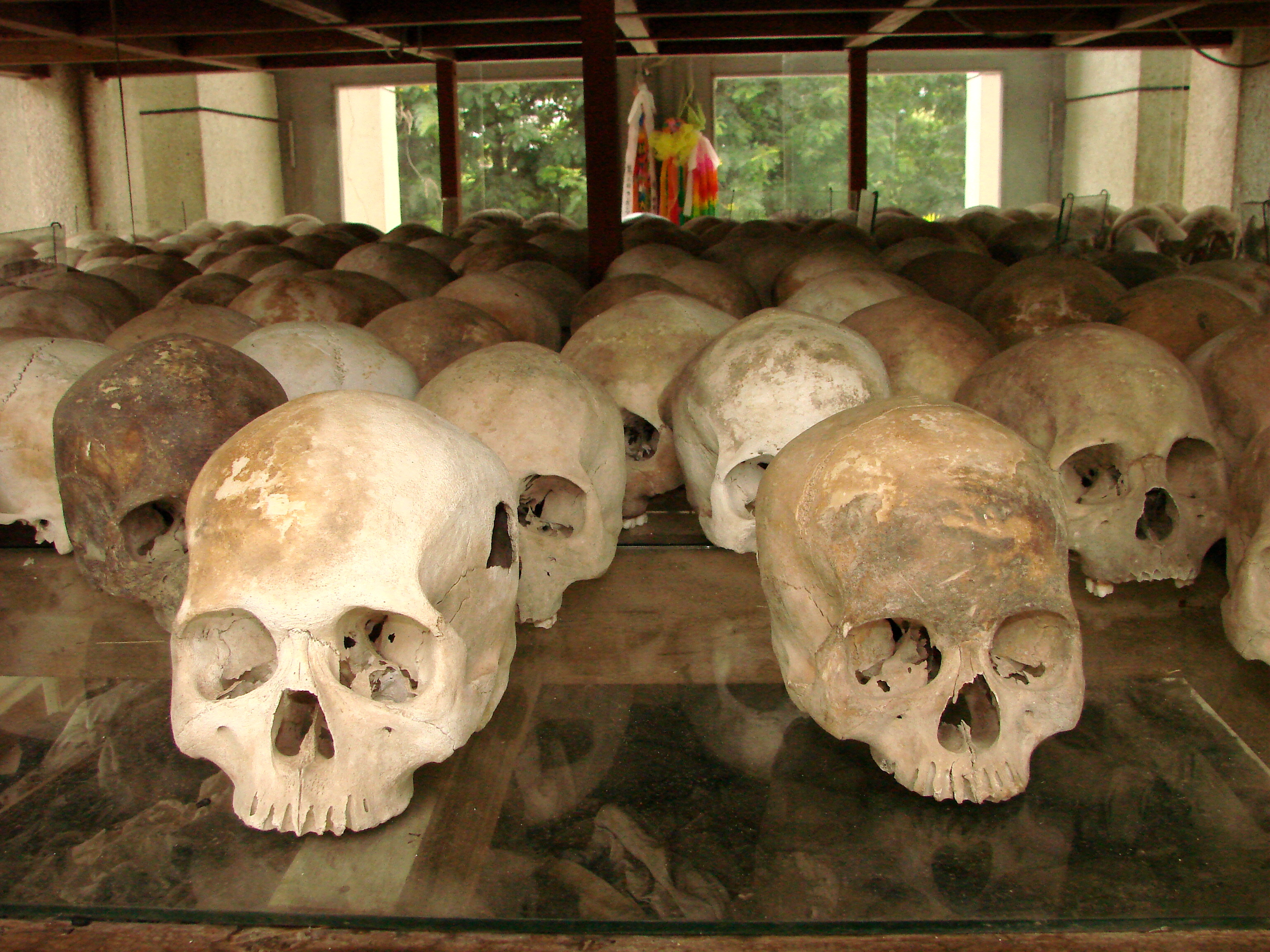
The Khmer Rouge killed between 1.6 and 2.8 million Cambodians during the Cambodian Genocide. The Khmer Rouge also invaded Ba Chúc, Vietnam, and massacred 3,157 Vietnamese civilians, which prompted Vietnam to invade Cambodia and overthrow the regime.

After the Fall of Saigon and Phnom Penh in April 1975 and the subsequent communist takeover in Laos five months later, Indochina was dominated by communist regimes. Armed border clashes between Cambodia and Vietnam soon flared up and escalated as Khmer Rouge forces advanced deep into Vietnamese territory and raided villages, killing hundreds of civilians. Vietnam counterattacked and in December 1978, PAVN troops invaded Cambodia, reaching Phnom Penh in January 1979 and arriving at the Thai border in spring 1979.

However, as China, the U.S. and the majority of the international community opposed the Vietnamese campaign, the remaining Khmer Rouge managed to permanently settle in the Thai-Cambodian border region. In a United Nations Security Council meeting, seven non-aligned members drafted a resolution for a ceasefire and Vietnamese withdrawal which failed due to opposition from the Soviet Union and Czechoslovakia. Thailand tolerated the presence of the Khmer Rouge on its soil as they helped to contain the Vietnamese and Thai domestic guerillas. Over the course of the following decade, the Khmer Rouge received considerable support from Vietnam's enemies and served as a bargaining tool in the Realpolitik of Thailand, China, the ASEAN and the U.S.

=== Vietnamese-Thailand conflict ===
Khmer Rouge forces operated from inside Thai territory attacking the pro-Hanoi People's Republic of Kampuchea's government. Similarly Vietnamese forces frequently attacked the Khmer Rouge bases inside Thailand. Eventually Thai and Vietnamese regular troops clashed on several occasions during the following decade. The situation escalated as Thailand's territorial sovereignty was violated on numerous occasions. Heavy fighting with many casualties resulted from direct confrontations between Vietnamese and Thai troops. Thailand increased troop strength, purchased new equipment and built a diplomatic front against Vietnam.

== Sino-Vietnamese conflicts ==
China attacked Vietnam in response to Vietnam's occupation of Cambodia, entered northern Vietnam and captured several cities near the border. On March 6, 1979, China declared that their punitive mission had been successful and withdrew from Vietnam. However, both China and Vietnam claimed victory. The fact that Vietnamese forces continued to stay in Cambodia for another decade implies that China's campaign was a strategic failure. On the other hand, the conflict had proven that China had succeeded in preventing effective Soviet support for its Vietnamese ally.

As forces remained mobilized, the Vietnamese Army and the Chinese People's Liberation Army engaged in another decade-long series of border disputes and naval clashes that lasted until 1990. These mostly local engagements usually wore out in prolonged stand-offs, as neither side achieved any long-term military gains. By the late 1980s the Vietnamese Communist Party's (VCP) began to adopt its Doi Moi (renovation) policy and reconsider its China policy in particular. Prolonged hostile relations with China had been recognized as to be detrimental to economic reforms, national security and the regime's survival. A number of political concessions opened the way for the normalization process of 1991.

== Regional conflicts ==
- The Insurgency in Laos
- The Communist insurgency in Thailand
- The Thai–Laotian Border War
- The Johnson South Reef Skirmish
- The FULRO insurgency against Vietnam

== See also ==
- First Indochina War
- Vietnam War
- Sino-Soviet split
