= Front for the Liberation of Champa =

Cham nationalist organisation (1962–1964)

- Front pour la libération du Champa
- Leader: Les Kosem
- Dates active: 1962–1964
- Active regions: Ninh Thuan, Binh Thuan, and Central Highlands, Vietnam
- Ideology: Cham independence Cham nationalism Militant Islamism
- Wars: FULRO insurgency against Vietnam

The Front for the Liberation of Champa (French: Front pour la libération du Champa; abbreviated FLC) was a Cham nationalist organisation active in Ninh Thuan province and the Central Highlands of Vietnam. It was founded in 1962 and merged with the Central Highlands Liberation Front and the Liberation Front of Kampuchea Krom to form the United Front for the Liberation of Oppressed Races (FULRO) in 1964.
