= Indochina wars =

Wars in Southeast Asia from 1945 to 1991

During the aftermath of World War II and the Cold War, the Indochina wars (Vietnamese: Chiến tranh Đông Dương) were a series of wars which were waged in Indochina from 1945 to 1991, by communist forces (mainly ones led by Vietnamese communists) against the opponents (mainly the Vietnamese nationalists, Trotskyists, the State of Vietnam, the Republic of Vietnam, the French, American, Laotian royalist, Cambodian royalist, and Chinese communist forces). The term "Indochina" referred to former French Indochina, which included the current states of Vietnam, Laos, and Cambodia. In current usage, it applies largely to a geographic region, rather than to a political area. The wars included:

- The First Indochina War (called the Indochina War in France and the French War in Vietnam) began after the end of World War II with the War in southern Vietnam (1945–1946), which acted as the precursor to the First Indochina War. The conflict officially began in 1946 as a battle of independence against colonialist powers and lasted until the French defeat in 1954. After a long campaign of unsuccessful resistance against the French and the Japanese, Viet Minh forces claimed a victory in the August Revolution after Japanese forces surrendered to the Allies on 15 August 1945, leading to the fall of the Empire of Vietnam and Nguyễn dynasty. In the War in southern Vietnam (1945–1946), British forces temporarily occupied the South with the objective of disarming Japanese forces, starting from 13 September 1945, only to restore French colonial control in 1946. Meanwhile, the communist Viet Minh sought to consolidate power by terrorizing and purging rival Vietnamese nationalist groups and Trotskyist activists. Additionally, other recently formed groups in Cambodia and Laos, such as the Khmer Issarak and the Lao Issara, also began their own guerrilla movements, advocating for independence in their respective countries. In the United Nations, and through their alliance with the United Kingdom and the United States, the French demanded return of their former Indochina colony prior to agreeing to participate in the NATO alliance (founded in 1949) opposing Soviet expansion beyond the countries of the Warsaw Pact (founded in 1955) in the Cold War. With support from China and the Soviet Union, the communist Viet Minh continued fighting the French Union, including the anti-communist State of Vietnam, ultimately forcing the NATO-backed French out of North Vietnam as a result of the 1954 Geneva Conference.
- The Second Indochina War was a group of interconnected civil wars in Vietnam, Cambodia, and Laos. Most often, it refers to what is called the Vietnam War in the United States (and the Anti-American War by North Vietnam). It began as a conflict between the United States-backed South Vietnamese government and its opponents, both the North Vietnamese-based communist Viet Cong (National Liberation Front) and the People's Army of Vietnam (PAVN), known in the West as the North Vietnamese Army (NVA). The conflict began in 1955 and lasted until 1975 when the North Vietnamese army conquered South Vietnam. The United States, which had supported France and its native vassal during the First Indochina war, backed the Republic of Vietnam government in opposition to the communist Viet Cong and PAVN. The North benefited from military and financial support from China, the Soviet Union, and other members of the communist bloc. Fighting also occurred during this time in Cambodia between the US-backed government, the PAVN, and the communist-backed Khmer Rouge, which also fought alongside deposed King Sihanouk's government in exile (known as the Cambodian Civil War, 1967–1975) and in Laos between the US-backed government, the PAVN, and the communist-backed Pathet Lao (known as the Laotian Civil War or Secret War, 1959–1975).
- The Third Indochina War was a period of prolonged conflict following the Second Indochina War. The conflict began in 1978 and lasted until the 1991 Paris Peace Agreements on 23 October 1991, in which several wars were fought:

- The Cambodian–Vietnamese War began when Vietnam invaded Cambodia and deposed the genocidal Khmer Rouge regime. The war lasted from 21 December 1978 to 23 October 1991. Cambodia's constitutional monarchy was then restored in 1993.

- The Sino-Vietnamese War was a four-week war fought in February–March 1979 between the People's Republic of China and the Socialist Republic of Vietnam. The Chinese launched a punitive expedition in revenge for the Vietnamese invasion of Cambodia, and withdrew a month later to prewar positions. Skirmishes along the border would continue until the two countries normalized relations on 5 November 1991.

- After the triumph of the Pathet Lao, an anti-communist insurgency in Laos lasted until most Hmong insurgents surrendered in 2007, though some resistance cells remained active for several years after. Thailand, which supported the Lao insurgents, as well as the anti-Vietnamese forces in the Third Indochina War, fought a few skirmishes with Vietnam in 1984, and a short conflict with Laos in 1987.

- FULRO insurgency in Vietnam – United Front for the Liberation of Oppressed Races

- The Communist Party of Thailand fought an insurgency from 1965 to 1989. They received backing from Laos and Vietnam from 1975 to 1979 but were expelled from their bases and lost most of their supply lines after they sided with the Cambodian-Chinese aligned forces, rather than the pro-Soviet Vietnamese and Laotian regimes.

== Background ==
=== French Indochina ===
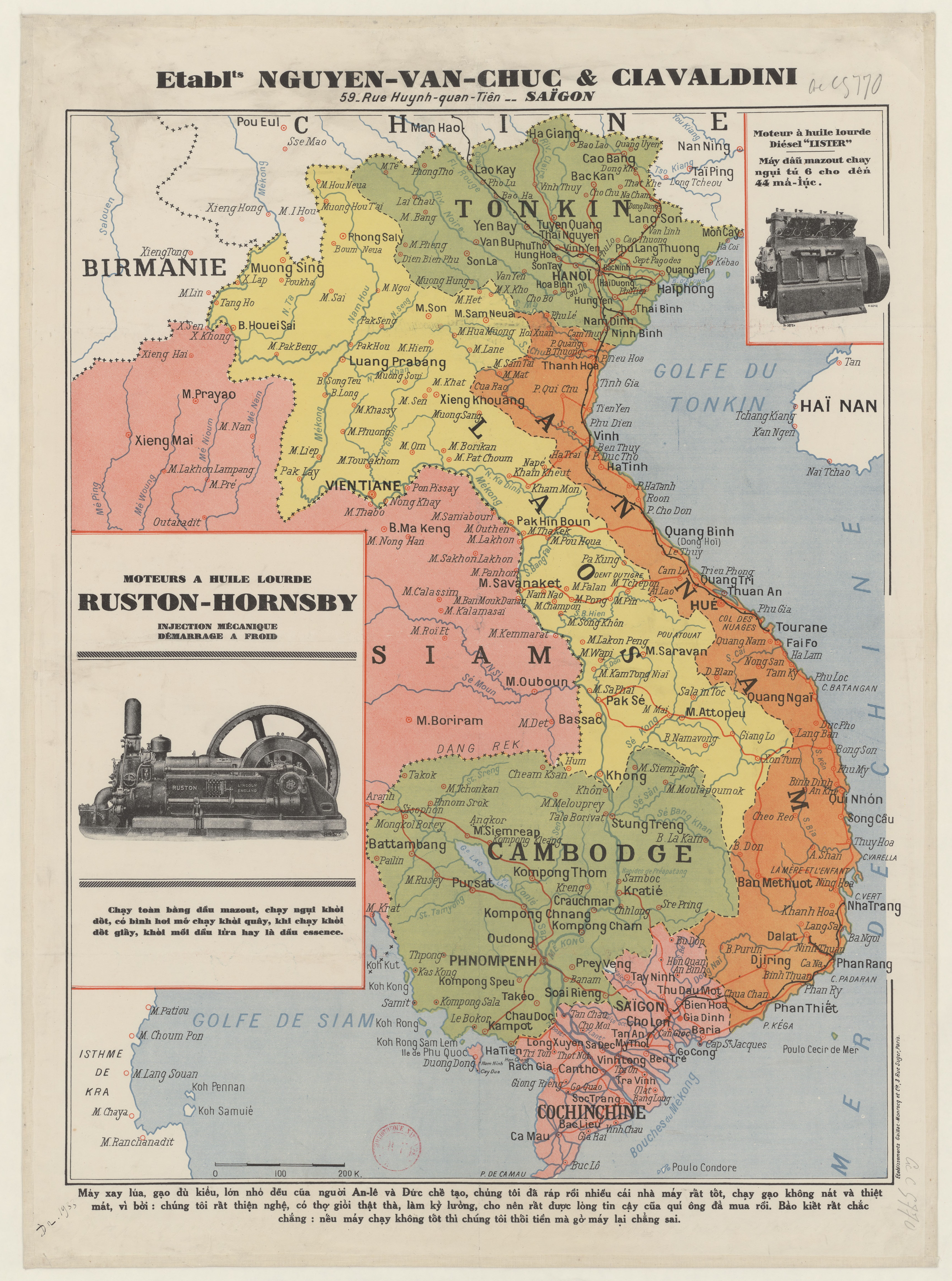
Indochine française 1928

The French colonization and occupation of Vietnam were a result of secular imperialism, driven by economic interests and strategic considerations. In addition to exploiting Vietnam's resources, the French saw the region as a strategic buffer to facilitate access to resources in China. France, however, used the pretext of protecting Christians, who were persecuted by the Nguyen, as a justification for their invasion of Vietnam. While Gia Long tolerated Catholicism, his successors Minh Mạng and Thiệu Trị were orthodox, fundamentalist Confucians, admiring ancient Chinese culture. They forbade Catholic proselytism and resisted European and American attempts to establish colonial trade posts, which France tried to impose. This was seen by colonial powers as "provocative".

Isolationist and chauvinist policy led the Vietnamese to refuse industrial modernization, so that they were not able to resist military power of a French invasion. In August 1858, Napoleon III ordered the landing of French forces at Tourane, (present-day Da Nang), beginning a colonial occupation that was to last almost a century. By 1884, the French had complete control over the country, which now formed the largest part of French Indochina. It took the Vietnamese people almost a century to expel the last colonial influence in their country.

Vietnamese independence movements were suppressed, and the French refused to honor what they had committed to in the protectorate treaty. Nguyen Sinh Cung established the Indochinese Communist Party (ICP) in 1930; the Marxist–Leninist party aimed to overthrow French rule and establish a communist state. Vietnam’s struggle for independence was also shaped by nationalist movements in two main strands: reformist and revolutionary, both embraced republicanism and anticommunist nationalism. Nationalist groups included the Vietnamese Nationalist Party, Vietnamese Revolutionary League, Đại Việt Nationalist Party, and religious communities such as Buddhist, Hòa Hảo, Cao Đài, and Catholic.

Fractures between nationalists and communists emerged in the late 1920s. Revolutionary nationalists accused communists of being factional and subservient to foreign influence, while communists contended nationalism was too narrow and republicanism not radical enough. Vietnamese communists envisioned their revolution as proletarian and an integral part of world revolution, rather than solely a national movement. They believed class struggle and purges were essential to dismantle older social structures and pave the way for socialism. The Vietnamese communist revolution’s pursuit of centralized control fueled a protracted civil conflict, characterized by violence, ideological purges, and the suppression of competing nationalist movements. The Indochinese Communist Party was primarily responsible for starting widespread Vietnamese-on-Vietnamese violence.

=== Indochina during World War II ===
Governor-general Jean Decoux, under the Vichy regime, allowed Japanese troops into northern Indochina in 1940. By 1941, Japan gained full military access across Indochina and established a fragile dual colonial rule that maintained French administration while facilitating Japanese preparations for Southeast Asian operations.

Ho Chi Minh, returning to Vietnam from France, helped create the Viet Minh front in 1941, advocating for independence. Meanwhile, Vichy French and Japanese authorities encouraged nationalism in Indochina for their own purposes. Disillusioned Vietnamese nationalists redirected this sentiment toward self-determination. Despite Japanese and French efforts to manipulate identities, profound societal changes occurred in the early 1940s, and Vietnam’s right-wing nationalist groups, particularly the Đại Việt parties, promoted a strong national identity.

In March 1945, Japan, losing the war, overthrew the French government in Indochina, established the Empire of Vietnam. The Vietnamese famine that broke out in 1944–1945 caused about 2 million deaths. With the end of the war, the Viet Minh launched the August Revolution to seek control in Vietnam. Emperor Bảo Đại abdicated power to the Viet Minh, on August 25. In a popular move, Ho Chi Minh made Bảo Đại "supreme advisor" to the Viet Minh-led government in Hanoi, which claimed its independence on September 2 as the Democratic Republic of Vietnam (DRV). The 16th parallel was established by the Allies on August 2, 1945, following the Potsdam Conference, dividing Vietnam into two military zones: Chinese Nationalist forces occupied the north, and British forces the south, to disarm Japanese troops.

== History ==
=== First Indochina War ===
Map displaying communist-led activities in Indochina 1950

Beginning in August 1945, the Viet Minh sought to consolidate power by terrorizing and purging rival Vietnamese nationalist groups and Trotskyist activists. On September 23, the British supported a French coup de force that overthrew the DRV government in Saigon and attempted to reinstate French control over southern Indochina. In 1946, the Franco-Chinese and Ho–Sainteny Agreements enabled French forces to replace the Chinese north of the 16th parallel and facilitated a coexistence between the DRV and the French that strengthened the Viet Minh while undermining the nationalists. That summer, the Viet Minh colluded with French forces to eliminate nationalists, targeted for their ardent anti-colonialism.

With most of the nationalist partisans defeated, and negotiations broken down, tensions between the Viet Minh and French authorities erupted into full-scale war in December 1946, a conflict which became entwined with the Cold War. Surviving nationalist partisans and politico-religious groups rallied behind the exiled Bảo Đại to reopen negotiations with France in opposition to communist domination. While the State of Vietnam, under Bảo Đại as Chief of State, aligned with the anticommunist Western Bloc, the French exploited it to extend their neo-colonial presence and to bolster their standing within NATO. By aligning with Marxist-Leninist principles, Vietnamese communists suppressed dissent and monopolized power through radical campaigns such as land reform, class struggle, ideological rectification, the eradication of judicial independence, and the suppression of the Nhân Văn–Giai Phẩm movement.

The anticommunist Truman Doctrine pledged United States support to nations resisting communism. After communist China and the Soviet Union recognized the Democratic Republic of Vietnam, the US recognized the State of Vietnam, based in Saigon, as the legitimate government in February 1950. The US provided substantial aid to the SVN through France, while China and, to a lesser extent, the Soviet Union aided the DRV. The war ended with the French defeat at the Battle of Dien Bien Phu and French withdrawal from North Vietnam after the Geneva Accords, signed between the Viet Minh and France. After the accords, Vietnam was partitioned into North Vietnam and South Vietnam.

=== Second Indochina War ===
Early period in the Second Indochina War

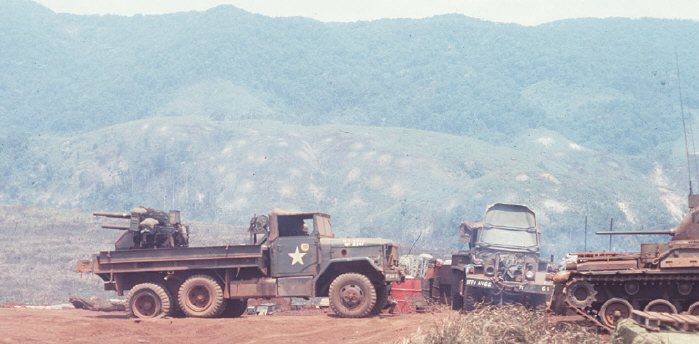
A truck-mounted Quad .50 at Khe Sanh Combat Base, during the Battle of Khe Sanh

The Second Indochina War, commonly known as the Vietnam War, was an armed conflict fought between North Vietnam, along with the Viet Cong, and South Vietnam and their allies. On the whole, the Vietnam War was a postcolonial war of national liberation, a theater of the global Cold War, and a civil war, in which civil warfare was a defining feature from the outset.

During the War, the North Vietnamese transported most of their supplies via the Ho Chi Minh Trail (known to the Vietnamese as the Truong Son Trail, after the Truong Son mountains), which ran through Laos and Cambodia. As a result, the areas of these nations bordering Vietnam would see heavy combat during the war.

For the United States, the political and combat goals were ambiguous: success and progress were ill-defined and, along with the large numbers of casualties, the Vietnam War raised moral issues that made the war increasingly unpopular at home. U.S. news reports of the 1968 Tet Offensive, especially from CBS, were unfavorable in regard to the lack of progress in ending the war. Although the 1968 Tet Offensive resulted in a military victory for South Vietnam and the United States, with virtually complete destruction of the NLF forces combat capability, it was, by the intensity of the combats, the contradiction it implied with recent reports of withdrawals of US troops and status of the war, also a turning point in American voter opposition to U.S. support for their Cold War Vietnamese allies. The Battle of Khe Sanh lasted 77 days during that period, making it one of the biggest single battles at that point in the war.

The United States began withdrawing troops from Vietnam in 1970, with the last troops returning in January, 1973. The Paris Peace Accords called for a cease-fire, and prohibited the North Vietnamese from sending more troops into South Vietnam - although the North Vietnamese were permitted to continue to occupy those regions of South Vietnam they had conquered in the 1972 Easter Offensive.

The North Vietnamese never intended to abide by the agreement. Fighting continued sporadically through 1973 and 1974, while the North Vietnamese planned a major offensive, tentatively scheduled for 1976. The North Vietnamese Army in South Vietnam had been ravaged during the Easter offensive in 1973, and it was projected that it would take until 1976 to rebuild their logistical capabilities.

The withdrawal had catastrophic effects on the South Vietnamese Army (ARVN). Shortly after the Paris Peace Accords, the United States Congress made major budget cuts in military aid to the South Vietnamese. The ARVN, which had been trained by American troops to use American tactics, quickly fell into disarray. Although it remained an effective fighting force throughout 1973 and 1974, by January 1975 it had disintegrated. The North Vietnamese hurriedly attacked the much weakened South, and were met with little resistance.

Saigon, the capital of South Vietnam, was taken by the PAVN on April 30, 1975, and the Second Indochina War ended.

The fighting that took place between North and South Vietnam following United States withdrawal is sometimes called the Third Indochina War; this term usually refers to a later 1979 conflict, however (see below).

=== Third Indochina War ===
The Third Indochina War, commonly known as the Cambodian–Vietnamese War, started on 1 May 1975 when the Kampuchean Revolutionary Army invaded the Vietnamese island of Phu Quoc. Vietnamese forces quickly counter-attacked, regaining their territory and invading the Kampuchean island of Koh Wai.

In August 1975, Vietnam returned the island of Koh Wai to Kampuchea and both governments started making peaceful noises, but behind the scenes tensions were mounting. On 30 April 1977, Kampuchea started attacking Vietnamese villages. In September, six divisions crossed the border, advancing 10 kilometers (6.2 mi) into Tay Ninh Province. Angered by the scale of the attacks, the Vietnam People's Army assembled eight divisions to launch a retaliatory strike against Kampuchea.

In December, in an effort to force the Kampuchean government to negotiate, the Vietnamese forces invaded Kampuchea, easily defeating the Kampuchean army. On 6 January 1978, Vietnamese forces were only 38 kilometers (24 mi) from Phnom Penh; however, the Kampuchean government remained defiant and the Vietnamese leadership realised they would not secure their political objective and decided to withdraw their troops.

As Kampuchean forces soon resumed their attacks across the border, the Vietnamese launched another limited counter-attack in June, forcing the Kampucheans to retreat. Again the Vietnamese withdrew and the Kampucheans resumed their attacks. The Vietnamese had had enough; in December 1978, Vietnam launched a full-scale invasion. Phnom Penh was captured in January 1979, the ruling Khmer Rouge were driven from power and a pro-Vietnamese government was installed.

In 1984, Vietnam unveiled a plan for the disengagement of its army from Kampuchea. In 1988, the Vietnamese Government began withdrawing forces in earnest; the last men left in September 1989.

The Third Indochina War also refers to the Sino-Vietnamese War, which was fought in February–March 1979 between the People's Republic of China and the Socialist Republic of Vietnam. Shortly after the Vietnamese invasion of Cambodia, the People's Republic of China, who were the Khmer Rouge's political ally, launched a punitive invasion of Vietnam. Fighting was short but intense. The Chinese advanced about forty kilometers into Vietnam, occupying the city of Lang Son on 6 March. There, they claimed the gate to Hanoi was open, declared their punitive mission achieved, and withdrew.

On 23 October 1991, the Cambodian-Vietnamese War was officially declared over as a result of negotiations and the signing of 1991 Paris Peace Agreements.

== See also ==
- Chinese Civil War
- Korean War
- Sino-Soviet split
- Indochina refugee crisis

Further conflicts in Indochina

== Bibliography ==
- Asselin, Pierre (2024). Vietnam's American War: A New History. Cambridge University Press. ISBN 9781009229302.
- Goscha, Christopher (2016). Vietnam: A New History. Basic Books. ISBN 9780465094370.
- Holcombe, Alec (2020). Mass Mobilization in the Democratic Republic of Vietnam, 1945–1960. University of Hawaiʻi Press. ISBN 9780824884475. JSTOR j.ctv105bb0z.
- Kort, Michael G. (2017). The Vietnam War Reexamined. Cambridge University Press. doi:10.1017/9781107110199. ISBN 9781107110199.
- Marr, David G. (2013). Vietnam: State, War, and Revolution (1945–1946). University of California Press. ISBN 9780520954977.
- Tran, Nu-Anh (2022). Disunion: Anticommunist Nationalism and the Making of the Republic of Vietnam. University of Hawaiʻi Press. ISBN 9780824887865.
- Vu, Tuong (2019). "In the Service of World Revolution: Vietnamese Communists' Radical Ambitions through the Three Indochina Wars". Journal of Cold War Studies. 21 (4): 4–30. doi:10.1162/jcws_a_00905.
- Asselin, Pierre (2023). "The Indochinese Communist Party's Unfinished Revolution of 1945 and the Origins of Vietnam's 30-Year Civil War". Journal of Cold War Studies. 25 (1): 4–45. doi:10.1162/jcws_a_01120.
