= 1991 Paris Peace Agreements =

Treaty between Cambodia and Vietnam

Paris Peace Agreements
Agreements on a Comprehensive Political Settlement of the Cambodia Conflict
- Type: Peace treaty
- Context: Cold War
- Signed: 23 October 1991; 34 years ago
- Location: Paris, France
- Signatories: Jean-Bernard Mérimée (Permanent Representative of France to the United Nations); Nugroho Wisnumurti (Deputy Permanent Representative of Indonesia to the United Nations. Chargé d'affaires a.i.)
- Parties: Australia; Brunei; Democratic Kampuchea; State of Cambodia; Canada; China; France; India; Indonesia; Japan; Laos; Malaysia; Philippines; Singapore; Soviet Union; Thailand; United Kingdom; United States; Vietnam; Yugoslavia
- Languages: Chinese; English; French; Russian

The Paris Peace Agreements (Khmer: សន្ធិសញ្ញាសន្តិភាពទីក្រុងប៉ារីស ឆ្នាំ១៩៩១; French: Accords de paix de Paris), officially the Comprehensive Cambodian Peace Agreements, was signed on 23 October 1991 and marked the official end of the Cambodian–Vietnamese War and the Third Indochina War. The agreement led to the deployment of the first UN peacekeeping mission (the United Nations Transitional Authority in Cambodia) since the Cold War and the first occasion in which the United Nations took over as the government of a state. The agreement was signed by nineteen countries.

The Paris Peace Agreements were the following conventions and treaties:

- The Final Act of the Paris Conference on Cambodia
- Agreement on the Political Settlement of the Cambodia Conflict
- Agreement Concerning the Sovereignty, Territorial Integrity and Inviolability, Neutrality and National Unity of Cambodia
- Declaration on the Rehabilitation and Reconstruction of Cambodia
