= Y Bhăm Êñuôl =

Rhade civil servant during the Vietnam War

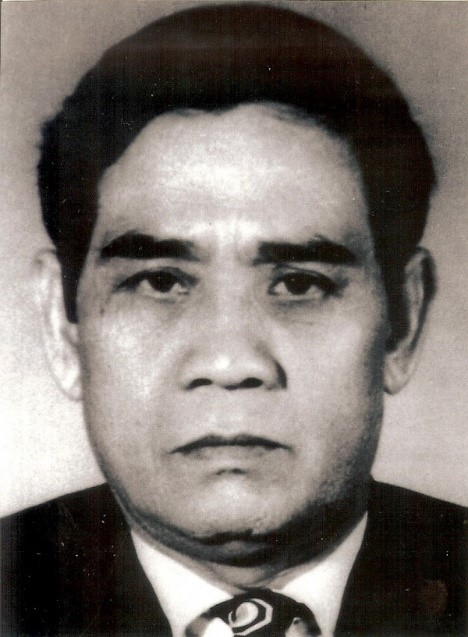

President of Central Autonomous Commission of the BAJARAKA
- In office 1957 – 20 September 1964

Deputy Governor of Đắk Lắk province
- In office 1963–1964

President of Central Highlands Liberation Front
- In office March 1964 – 20 September 1964

Chairman of Central Committee of FULRO
- In office 20 September 1964 – 20 April 1975

Personal details
- Born: 1913 Buôn Ma Thuột, Đắk Lắk province, French Indochina
- Died: 20 April 1975 (aged 61–62) Phnom Penh, Democratic Kampuchea
- Party: BAJARAKA; Central Highlands Liberation Front (FLHP) FULRO

Military service
- Allegiance: South Vietnam; FULRO
- Battles/wars: Vietnam War; FULRO insurgency; 1964 FLHP rebellion; Cambodian Civil War; Fall of Phnom Penh

Y Bham Enuol (Y Bhăm Êñuôl; Y Bham for short; 1913–20 April 1975) was a Rhade civil servant and a prominent figure during the Vietnam War.

Y Bham Enuol was born in Buôn Ma Thuột, Đắk Lắk Province in 1913. On May 1, 1958, he established BAJARAKA, an organization seeking autonomy for minorities in the Central Highlands. BAJARAKA was the predecessor of the United Front for the Liberation of Oppressed Races (FULRO), which played an important role during the Vietnam War. Y Bham was selected president of FULRO.

On 20 September 1964, Y Bham was arrested and deported to Cambodia. Later, he lived in Phnom Penh. When the Communist Party of Kampuchea (Khmer Rouge) seized Phnom Penh on 17 April 1975, Y Bham and other FULRO leaders living in Phnom Penh sought refuge in the French Embassy. On 20 April they were all taken out and executed. However, members of FULRO did not know of his death until, after seventeen years American journalist Nate Thayer informed the group that Y Bham had been executed.
