= United Front for the Liberation of Oppressed Races =

Vietnamese guerrilla organization (1964–1992)

- Front unifié de lutte des races opprimées
- Leaders: FLC leader: Les Kosem, Po Dharma; FLHP leader: Y Bham Enuol; FLKK leader: Chau Dera
- Dates active: 1964–1992
- Active regions: Central Highlands, Vietnam; Mondulkiri Province, Cambodia
- Wars: Vietnam War, Third Indochina War, Insurgency in Laos, FULRO insurgency

The United Front for the Liberation of Oppressed Races (FULRO; French: Front unifié de lutte des races opprimées, Vietnamese: Mặt trận Thống nhất Đấu tranh của các Sắc tộc bị Áp bức) was a separatist political and militant organization which conducted a decades-long insurgency in Mainland Southeast Asia during the Indochina wars with the aim of achieving autonomy for various indigenous peoples and ethnic minorities in Southern Vietnam, including the Montagnards in the Central Highlands, the Chams in Central Vietnam, and the Khmer Krom in the south. It was opposed to all forms of Vietnamese rule.

Preceded by a number of separatist groups, FULRO was founded in 1964. Initially a political movement, after 1969 it evolved into a fragmented guerrilla group that carried on simultaneous insurgencies against both the U.S.-aligned government of South Vietnam under President Nguyen Van Thieu, and against the Soviet-aligned communist government of North Vietnam under Ho Chi Minh, in the context of the wider Vietnam War. FULRO's primary supporter during the 1960s and early 1970s was Cambodia under Norodom Sihanouk, with some aid sent by the People's Republic of China during the Third Indochina War.

Fractured by nature, FULRO was a symbolic alliance of various indigenous and ethnic groups in southern Vietnam formed as an armed reaction against the ethnic discrimination and land deprivation undertaken by South Vietnamese President Ngo Dinh Diem and the following right-wing military junta in Saigon. FULRO's nominal leader, Y Bham Enuol, an ethnic Rhade, was put into prison by Ngo Dinh Diem in September 1958. Y Bham Enuol remained exiled in Cambodia after 1963 for the rest of the war, while Y Bih Aleo, the left-wing former co-founder of BAJARAKA (which preceded FULRO), became the Vice President of the National Liberation Front of South Vietnam (NLF; or "Viet Cong") and leader of the NLF's Montagnard Autonomy Movement in 1961. FULRO organized two Montagnard uprisings among the ranks of US-trained local Civilian Irregular Defense Groups (CIDGs), in September 1964 and December 1965, which were both violently repressed by the South Vietnamese Army (ARVN). After the Vietnam War ended, the Pentagon and CIA aided the anti-communist wing of FULRO, under former US Special Forces interpreter Y Tlur Eban, in renewing the movement, this time against the newly-unified Socialist Republic of Vietnam. Their bases moved to Cambodia after the Vietnamese invasion in 1979, after which FULRO's strength was diminished irreversibly. By 1987, the movement only survived in refugee camps along the Thai-Cambodian border. FULRO was formally dissolved in 1992, when the last group of 407 FULRO fighters and their families handed in their weapons to United Nations peacekeepers in Cambodia.

FULRO built its strength mainly by recruiting Montagnard CIDGs (mostly Rhade, Jarai, and Koho). Due to the high-profile proximity and involvement of the United States Special Forces with the Montagnard CIDGs and FULRO, South Vietnamese and later Socialist Republic of Vietnam governments saw FULRO as a subversive movement used by the CIA to interfere with Vietnamese sovereignty. However, official American policy was in opposition to FULRO so as not to jeopardize its relationship with the South Vietnamese government, and in 1965 U.S. Army General William Westmoreland of the MACV issued an instruction to US soldiers ordering that they "should avoid all contacts with FULRO."

== Historical origins of FULRO ==
For centuries, Vietnamese rulers had expanded their domains southward, conquering Khmer and Cham territory as part of the Nam tiến (March to the South) and then colonizing it militarily under the đồn điền (plantation) system. The last Champa kingdom was annexed by Imperial Vietnam in 1832.

The French colonial regime ended up contributing to separatist movements among the Cham and Khmer by supporting the Islamization of Cham communities as a counterweight to the largely Buddhist Vietnamese, and by transferring a number of Khmer Krom provinces from Cambodia to its colony in Vietnam in 1949.

The South Vietnamese government that succeeded the French required Khmer Krom people to change their names to Vietnamese-sounding names in order to go to school or apply for a job, then forced students to speak only in Vietnamese, and instituted a land reform policy that settled Vietnamese on Khmer Krom land.

These measures led to the creation of several separatist groups, including the republican "Free Khmer", or Khmer Serei, movement founded by Dr. Son Ngoc Thanh in 1958, and the Kaingsaing Sar, or Khmer White Scarves movement, a semi-mystic, semi-military group, founded in 1959 by a monk, Samouk Seng. Prince Norodom Sihanouk of Cambodia supported the White Scarves movement as a counterbalance to the Khmer Serei. The Front for the Liberation of the Kampuchea-Krom, or the FLKK, absorbed the Kaingsaing Sar. The Les Kosem-led "Champa Liberation Front" was founded in Phnom Penh in 1960.

The Vietnamese had also been hostile for years to the Montagnards, the native inhabitants of the Central Highlands (Vietnam), referring to them as "savage" (mọi), based on their distinct religion, culture, language, and the Malayo-Polynesian ethnicity of some Montagnard groups such as the Jarai (Gia Rai). These hostilities intensified when Montagnard-inhabited Central Highlands became open to Vietnamese settlement under French rule.

The South Vietnamese government under Ngô Đình Diệm applied similar policies in the 1950s, abolishing the autonomous Montagnard area in 1955, then resettling Northern Vietnamese refugees on Montagnard land to colonize indigenous lands as part of state-sponsored land reform programs (Cải cách điền địa). Because the program abolished indigenous status and recognition of indigenous land ownership, it led to a Montagnard revolt against the Vietnamese administration in the Central Highlands in 1958, led by Y Bham Enuol, a Rhade intellectual and civil activist.

The South Vietnamese government persisted with its "Social and Economic Council for the Southern Highlands" without making any provision for local autonomy, claiming that these communities needed to be "developed" as they were "poor" and "ignorant". Ethnic Vietnamese were settled from the coastal regions into the highlands, with 50,000 Vietnamese settlers moving in the highlands by 1960 and 200,000 by 1963. The Highlander Liberation Front (Mặt trận Giải phóng Dân tộc Thượng, Front de Libération des Montagnards) was founded in 1955 during a meeting of indigenous Montagnards who had originally rallied to Y Thih Eban against the South Vietnamese government cadres.

Montagnard hostility was not limited, however, to the South Vietnamese government, but extended as well to North Vietnam, based on the ill-treatment their communities had received at the hands of the Vietnamese before the division of Vietnam.

=== BAJARAKA ===
On May 1, 1958, a group of intellectuals, headed by a French-educated Rhade (Ê Đê) civil servant, Y Bham Enuol, established an organization seeking greater autonomy for the minorities of the Vietnamese Central Highlands. The organization was given the name BAJARAKA, which stood for four main ethnic groups: the Bahnar (Ba Na), the Jarai, the Rhade, and the Koho (Cơ Ho).

On July 25, BAJARAKA issued a notice to the embassies of France and the United States and to the United Nations, denouncing acts of racial discrimination, and requesting government intervention to secure independence. BAJARAKA held several demonstrations in Kon Tum, Pleiku, and Buôn Ma Thuột in August and September 1958. These were quickly suppressed and the most prominent leaders of the movement arrested; they would remain in jail for the next few years.

One of BAJARAKA's leaders, Y Bih Aleo, later joined the National Liberation Front of South Vietnam, more commonly known as the Viet Cong.

=== FLHP ===
The early 1960s were to see increasing military activity in the Central Highlands; from 1961, American military advisers had assisted in setting up armed village defence militias (the Civilian Irregular Defense Groups, CIDG).

In 1963, after the 1963 South Vietnamese coup to overthrow Ngô Đình Diệm, all the leaders of BAJARAKA were released. In an effort to integrate Montagnard ambitions, several of them were given government posts: Paul Nur, vice-president of BAJARAKA, was appointed deputy provincial chief for the province of Kon Tum, while Y Bham Enuol, the movement's president, was appointed deputy provincial governor of Đắk Lắk Province. By March 1964, with US backing, the leaders of BAJARAKA, along with representatives of other ethnic groups and of the Upper Cham people, established the Central Highlands Liberation Front (French: Front de Liberation des Hauts Plateaux, FLHP).

The Front rapidly split into two factions. One faction, advocating peaceful means, was led by Y Bham Enuol. A second, led by Y Dhon Adrong, a former Rhade teacher, advocated violent resistance. From March to May 1964, Adrong's faction infiltrated the border with Cambodia and set up at the old French base, Camp le Rolland, in Mondulkiri Province within 15 km of the Vietnamese border, where they continued to recruit FLHP fighters.

== Early history and operations during the Vietnam War ==
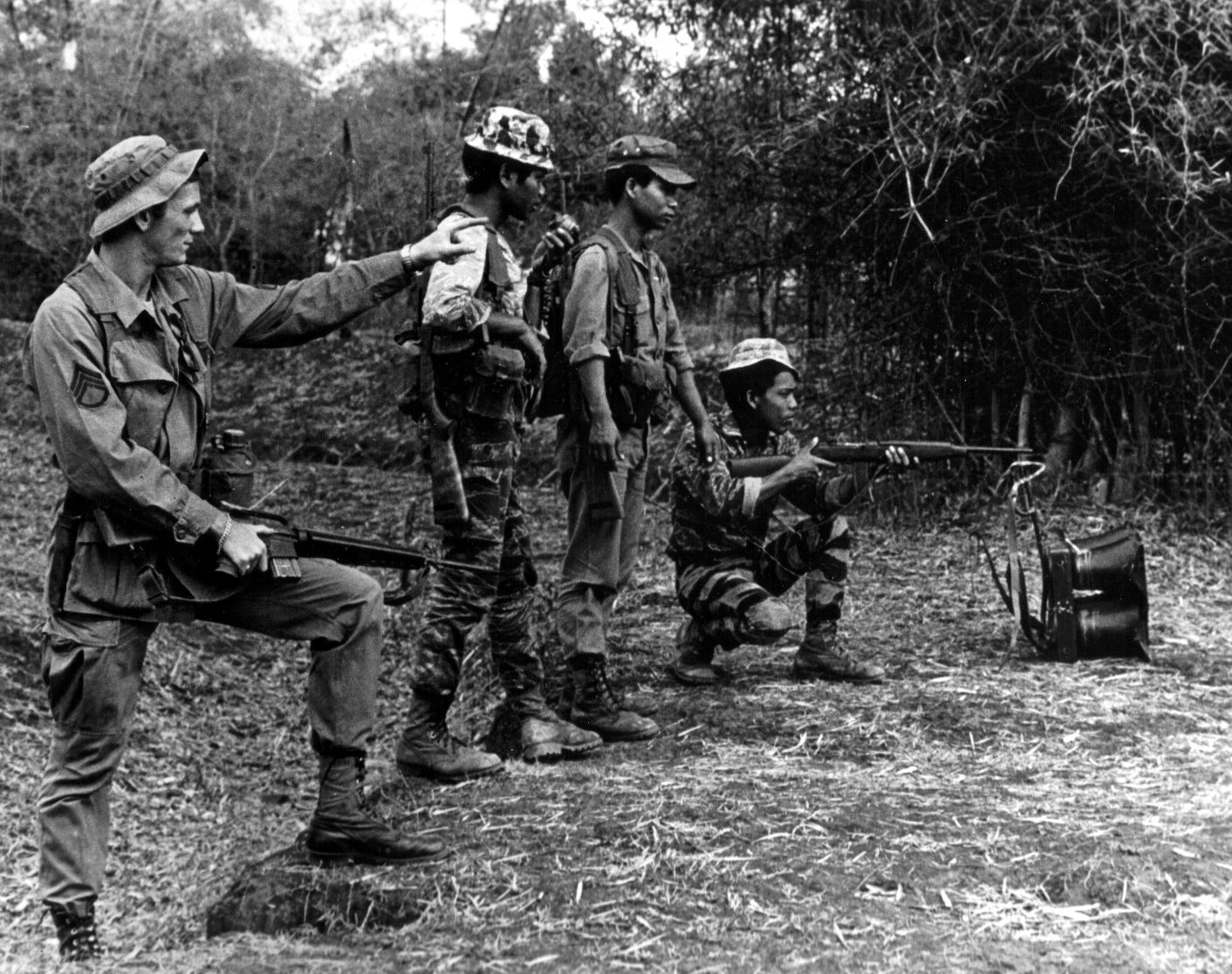
A US Army soldier trains CIDG Montagnard guerrillas (not members of FULRO)

In the meantime, the regional ambitions of Prince Norodom Sihanouk had led to an effort to coordinate the operations of various separatist groups operating within South Vietnam and in the Cambodian border areas. Prince Sihanouk launched the Indochinese People's conference in Phnom Penh March 1963 with Y Bham Enuol.

Y Dhon Adrong's faction of the FLHP made contact with two other groups:

- The Front for the Liberation of Champa (Front pour la Libération du Champa, FLC) led by Lieutenant Colonel Les Kosem, a Cham officer in the Royal Cambodian Army (FARK).
- The Liberation Front of Kampuchea Krom (Front de Liberation du Kampuchea Krom, FLKK), representing the Khmer Krom of the Mekong Delta, led by former monk Chau Dara.

Kosem, the most senior Cham officer in the Cambodian army, had been involved in Cham activism since the late 1950s, and is suspected to have been working as a double agent for both the Cambodian secret service and the French. Chau Dara, the founder of the FLKK, was also suspected of working for the Cambodian secret service.

These contacts were to lead to the establishment of the United Front for the Liberation of Oppressed Races (FULRO), based on the above groups and the FLHP. The flag of FULRO was designed with three stripes: one blue (representing the sea), one red (representing the struggle of the Montagnards) and one green (representing the mountains). Three white stars on the central red stripe represented the three fronts of FULRO. A later form of the flag replaced the blue stripe with black.

While FULRO claimed to speak for the Cham, Khmer and Montagnard communities, its common bond and ideology was anti-Vietnamese sentiment, with questionable allegiance to anything else.

In 1965, FULRO released maps showing that their ultimate goal was for Montagnard and Cham independence within a revived new Champa state and for Khmers to retake Cochinchina. It was based in Ratanakiri and Mondulkiri provinces in Cambodia, and the Central Highlands in Vietnam.

The Viet Cong approached FULRO after its founding. No agreements were reached and hostilities between FULRO and the NLF continued. The US later sought to capitalize on these communities' animosity towards the Vietnamese to use FULRO against the NLF.

=== The 1964 Buôn Ma Thuột rebellion ===
On September 20, 1964, there was an outbreak of violence by American-trained CIDG troops in the Special Forces bases of Buon Sar Pa and Bu Prang in Quảng Đức Province (now Đắk Nông Province) and in Buon Mi Ga, Ban Don and Buon Brieng in Đắk Lắk Province. Several Vietnamese soldiers were killed and the Americans disarmed, and FULRO activists from the Buon Sar Pa base seized the radio station on Route 14 on the south-west outskirts of Buôn Ma Thuột, from which they broadcast calls for independence.

Outsiders advising and assisting the dissident Montagnards were Y Dhon Adrong, two officers of the Royal Khmer Army, Lieutenant Colonel Y Bun Sur, a member of the M'Nong tribe and Province Chief of Cambodia's Mondulkiri Province, Les Kosem, and Chau Dara.

During the morning of September 21, Y Bham Enuol was quickly abducted from his residence in Buôn Ma Thuột by elements from the Buon Sar Pa group and communiques were issued in his name. Several weeks later, Y Bham's family were quietly taken from his village, Buon Ea Bong, three kilometres northwest of Buôn Ma Thuột, and escorted into the FULRO base in Cambodia's Mondulkiri Province.

On the evening of September 21, 1964, Brigadier General Nguyễn Hữu Cơ, the commander of Military Region II, who had flown down to Buôn Ma Thuột from his headquarters in Pleiku, met with several rebel leaders from Buon Enao, during which he assured them of his partial support of some of their demands in representations to Prime Minister General Nguyễn Khánh and the Saigon government. Following progress in their negotiations, General Co requested that the rebel leaders brief the other dissident elements and ask them to peacefully return to their bases and await the outcome of the negotiations. The leaders who had met with General Cơ the previous night were prevented from briefing the Buon Sar Pa group which, still disgruntled, returned to their Buon Sar Pa Special Forces base, accompanied by Colonel John F. Freund, the US Army advisor to General Cơ. Colonel Freund's decision to accompany the still dissident Buon Sar Pa group was not authorised by General Cơ.

The Buon Sar Pa group continued to defy the Vietnamese authorities and most of the CIDG force deserted their Buon Sar Pa base and moved, with their weapons and equipment, across the international border and into Cambodia's Mondulkiri Province. Those CIDG troops remaining in the Buon Sar Pa base were threatened by General Cơ with a sharp military response and Freund, who had stayed with them, persuaded them to officially surrender to Prime Minister General Nguyễn Khánh. An official surrender ceremony took place in the mostly deserted Buon Sar Pa base; however this resulted in a loss of face for those dissident Montagnards who had agreed to stand down and await the promises made by General Co during negotiations with their leaders on the night of September 21, 1964.

During the weeks that followed, the Buon Sar Pa CIDG deserters in their base in Mondulkiri Province were reinforced by a large number of deserters from the other CIDG Special Forces bases. Y Bham was named head of FULRO, given the rank of General and named President of the High Plateau of Champa, a sign of the influence on the dissidents by the Cham advisers, Lieutenant Colonel Les Kosem and Chau Dara. A Cham goddess's name was used as a call sign by Les Kosem.

Cambodia was suspected of support for the rebellion. At the time of the revolt, Y Bun Sur and Les Kosem were senior officers serving in the Royal Khmer Army and both were also agents of Cambodia's 12th Bureau, the country's secret intelligence service. As well, Y Bun Sur was still the Province Chief of Mondulkiri Province. This indicates the likely involvement of the government of Prince Sihanouk. Y Bun Sur was also an agent in France's secret intelligence service at that time, the Service de Documentation Extérieure et de Contre-Espionnage (SDECE). This indicates possible involvement of the French in the revolt.

The Americans were unsure who was ultimately responsible for the CIDG rebellion and initially blamed the Viet Cong and French. However, the 'neutralist' Cambodian regime of Sihanouk had probably the greatest hand in events: the 20 September 1964 'Declaration' by the Haut Comité of FULRO contained anti-SEATO rhetoric that bore a strong resemblance to that issued by Sihanouk's regime in the same period. Meanwhile, Sihanouk hosted a conference, the "Indochinese People's Conference", in Phnom Penh in early 1965, at which Enuol headed a FULRO delegation.

Y Bham brought FULRO to the fore in 1965 when FULRO published anti-South Vietnamese propaganda against CIDG troops that attacked the Saigon regime and applauded Cambodia for its support.

Adjacent to Vietnam, the Cambodian forests were a base by FULRO fighters battling the Democratic Republic of Vietnam. Lack of progress in gaining concessions led to another FULRO uprising by its more militant faction in December 1965, in which 35 Vietnamese (including civilians) were killed. This event was rapidly suppressed, and four captured FULRO commanders (Nay Re, Ksor Bleo, R'Com Re and Ksor Boh) were publicly executed.

An FULRO declaration in 1965 announced to the United Nations and the Member States of the Committee of Decolonization that they would be fighting against both South Vietnam and the US to achieve independence. Initial media and sources from Saigon dismissively downplayed the FULRO threats, suggesting that the uprising was held by a small group of "illiterate" highlanders. When the Khánh regime collapsed in June 1965, the administration under new Prime Minister of South Vietnam Nguyễn Cao Kỳ terminated the state's discriminatory development programs to appease the tensions with the indigenous peoples.

=== Negotiations and divisions ===
On June 2, 1967, Y Bham Enuol sent a delegation to Buôn Ma Thuột to petition the South Vietnamese government. On June 25 and 26, 1967, a congress of ethnic minorities throughout South Vietnam was convened to finalise a joint petition, and on August 29, 1967, a meeting was held under the direction of Nguyễn Văn Thiệu, President of the National Leadership Committee and Major General Nguyễn Cao Kỳ, President of the Central Executive Committee.

The South Vietnamese government sent a diplomatic contingent to Buôn Mê Thuột in August 1968 to negotiate with FULRO representatives, including Y Bham, after a promise of safe conduct was given to him by Prime Minister Trần Văn Hương. FULRO's grievances against South Vietnam were no longer the top priority for Cambodia at this point, however, because the Khmer Rouge was starting to distract Sihanouk in 1968.

By December 11, 1968, negotiations between FULRO and the Vietnamese authorities had resulted in an agreement to recognise minority rights, establish a Ministry to support these rights, and to allow Y Bham Enuol to remain permanently in Vietnam. However, some elements of FULRO, notably FLC head Les Kosem, opposed the deal with the Vietnamese. On December 30, 1968, Kosem, at the head of several battalions of the Royal Cambodian Army, and accompanied by a group from the militant FULRO wing responsible for the 1965 fighting, surrounded and took Camp le Rolland. Enuol was placed under effective house arrest in Phnom Penh at the residence of Colonel Um Savuth of the Cambodian army, where he was to remain for the next six years.

On February 1, 1969, a final treaty was signed between Paul Nur, representing South Vietnam, and Y Dhon Adrong. These events signified the end of FULRO as a 'political' movement, especially as its previous backer, the Sangkum regime of Sihanouk, was to fall to the Cambodian coup of 1970. However, some elements of FULRO, dissatisfied with the treaty, continued armed resistance in the Central Highlands. These disparate armed groups looked forward to the collapse of the Saigon regime and had some local cooperation with the Viet Cong, who offered unofficial support such as caring for their wounded.

=== After the fall of Sihanouk and Lon Nol ===
After overthrowing pro-China Sihanouk, Cambodian leader Lon Nol, despite being anti-Communist and ostensibly in the "pro-American" camp, backed FULRO against both anti-communist South Vietnam and the communist Viet Cong. Lon Nol planned a slaughter of all Vietnamese in Cambodia and a restoration of South Vietnam to a revived Champa state. The Khmer Rouge later imitated Lon Nol's actions.

Lon Nol backed FULRO hill tribes, fighting a proxy war against the NLF via Khmer Krom detachments in South Vietnam and Cambodia's frontier region, as he desired to emulate Van Pao.

On April 17, 1975, the Cambodian Civil War ended when the Khmer Rouge – then in a political alliance with Sihanouk, the GRUNK – took Phnom Penh. Y Bham, Y Bun Sur, and some 150 members of the militant FULRO faction were, at the time, under house arrest in the compound of Colonel Um Savuth of the Khmer Army located near Pochentong Airport. They left the compound and sought refuge in the French Embassy. The Khmer Rouge forced the senior French diplomat to hand the group, men, women and children, over to them. They were then marched to the Lambert Stadium, then on the northern edge of Phnom Penh, where they were executed, along with many officials of the Cambodian regime, by the Khmer Rouge. The remaining FULRO guerrillas in Vietnam, however, were to remain unaware of Y Bham's death.

== After the fall of South Vietnam ==
After Saigon fell and the South Vietnamese government collapsed under the hands of North Vietnam in 1975, FULRO continued the fight against the newly founded Socialist Republic of Vietnam. It was suggested that the United States continue to support FULRO in its struggle against the Vietnamese government. Several thousand FULRO troops under Brigadier General Y Ghok Nie Krieng carried on fighting the Vietnamese forces, but the promised American aid did not materialize.

FULRO continued operations in the remote highlands throughout the late 1970s and into the early 1980s, but it was increasingly weakened by internal divisions, and trapped in an ongoing conflict between the Khmer Rouge and Vietnam. China gave FULRO aid and assistance via Thailand to fight the Vietnamese throughout the 1970s and 1980s (and during the Sino-Vietnamese War), while also backing ethnic minorities in northern Vietnam along the border against the Vietnamese. There was high mobility among ethnic minorities such as the Hmong, Yao, Nung, and Tai across the border between China and Vietnam.

As a result, there was a peak in this second phase of the FULRO insurgency during the 1980s. FULRO attacked the PAVN forces and police stations in the provinces of Đắk Lắk, Kon Tum, and Gia Lai. Some estimates gave the total number of FULRO troops in this period at 7,000, mostly based in Mondulkiri, and supplied with Chinese armaments via the Khmer Rouge, which was by this point fighting its own guerrilla war in western Cambodia. However, by 1986, this aid had ceased, a Khmer Rouge spokesman stating that while the tribesmen were "very, very brave", they had "no support from any leadership" and "no political vision".

Following the cessation of supplies, the bitter guerrilla warfare would however in time reduce FULRO's forces to no more than a few hundred. In 1980, a unit of over 200 fighters was forced to split off and take refuge in Khmer Rouge territory on the Thai-Cambodian border. In 1985, 212 of these soldiers, under the command of Y Ghok Nie Krieng and Pierre K'Briuh, moved across Cambodia to the Thai border where Lieutenant General Chavalit Yongchaiyudh, then Commander of the 2nd Royal Thai Army, advised them that the Americans were no longer interested in fighting the Vietnamese. General Chavalit advised them to seek refugee status through UNHCR. Once this was granted, they were moved to North Carolina in the U.S.

In August 1992, journalist Nate Thayer traveled to Mondulkiri and visited the last FULRO base. Thayer informed the group that their leader, Y Bham, had been executed by the Khmer Rouge seventeen years previously. The FULRO troops surrendered their weapons in October 1992; many of this group were given asylum in the United States. Even at this late stage, they only decided to give up armed struggle when they finally heard that Y Bham Enuol had been executed in April 1975.

== Post-insurgency ==
A 2002 op-ed in The Washington Times written by Michael Benge, a senior adviser to the Montagnard Human Rights Organisation, claimed that Montagnard women were subjected to forced mass sterilization by the Vietnamese government. The article also alleged that the government was stealing lands of Montagnards and attacking their religious beliefs, killing and torturing them in a form of "creeping genocide". Luke Simpkins, an MP in the Australian House of Representatives, condemned the Vietnamese persecution of the Montagnards in 2011. Noting that both the South Vietnamese government and the regime of unified Communist Vietnam had attacked the Montagnards and conquered their lands as well as how FULRO had fought against the Vietnamese, Simpkins expressed support for the desire of the Montagnards to preserve their culture and language. The Vietnamese government has non-Montagnards settle on Montagnard land and killed Montagnards after jailing them.

Former Green Beret and writer Don Bendell has accused the Communist Vietnamese government of implementing a genocidal and discriminatory policy against the native Montagnards in the Central Highlands, banning native languages and implementing the Vietnamese language, having Vietnamese men marry Montagnard girls and women by force, colonizing the Central Highlands with massive amounts of Vietnamese settlers from the lowlands, inflicting terror and on the Montagnards with police force, making them perform slave labor, as well as erecting plantations for rubber, tea, and coffee on the Central Highlands after destroying the vegetation in the area. Bendell described these policies as creating "apartheid-like conditions".

According to researcher Seb Rumsby, there exist certain but unrecognized imperial relationships between ethnic Kinh colonizers and indigenous minorities, and following that plenty of daily resistance from the Montagnards to systemic state discrimination and repressive assimilation policies. While marginalization and racial stereotypes about the Montagnards are abundant, few of them can be exactly figured out and acknowledged now, as Kinh chauvinism has made it difficult for the majority of the country to truly comprehend what the experience of indigenous minorities faced with racism is like.

== See also ==
- Anti-Vietnamese sentiment
- Champa independence movement
- Racism in Vietnam

== Sources ==
- Nhìn lại phong trào BAJARAKA—BBC Vietnamese
