= Po Dharma =

Cham cultural historian (1948–2019)

- Born: Quảng Văn Đủ; October 9, 1948; Palei Baoh Dana, Ninh Thuận Province, French Indochina
- Died: February 22, 2019 (aged 70); Toulouse, France

Po Dharma (9 October 1948 – 22 February 2019) was a Vietnamese human rights activist and Cham cultural historian.

Po Dharma was a Cham, born as Quảng Văn Đủ. His birthplace was Chất Thường Village (Cham: Palei Baoh Dana), Ninh Phước District, Ninh Thuận Province. He was a leader of FULRO during the Vietnam War, being severely injured during the war in December 1970 in Kampong Cham against North Vietnamese communist forces. He later quit his military career after getting permission to from Les Kosem, and went to France.

He obtained a bachelor's degree in 1978, a master’s degree in 1980, and a PhD in 1986. His research was mainly about Champa history and Cham cultures.

Po Dharma and his family were not allowed to return to Vietnam.

Po Dharma died in Toulouse on 22 February 2019.
