= Vietnamese irredentism =

Irredentism movement in Vietnam

Vietnamese irredentism, also known as the ideology of Greater Vietnam (Vietnamese: chủ nghĩa Đại Việt Nam), sometimes referred to as Baiyue nationalism (chủ nghĩa dân tộc Bách Việt) is an irredentist and nationalist claim concerning redemption of former territories of Vietnam and territories outside Vietnam that the Vietnamese have inhabited for centuries. Notable claims are usually made concerning territories of Laos, Cambodia, and Liangguang of China.

== Background ==
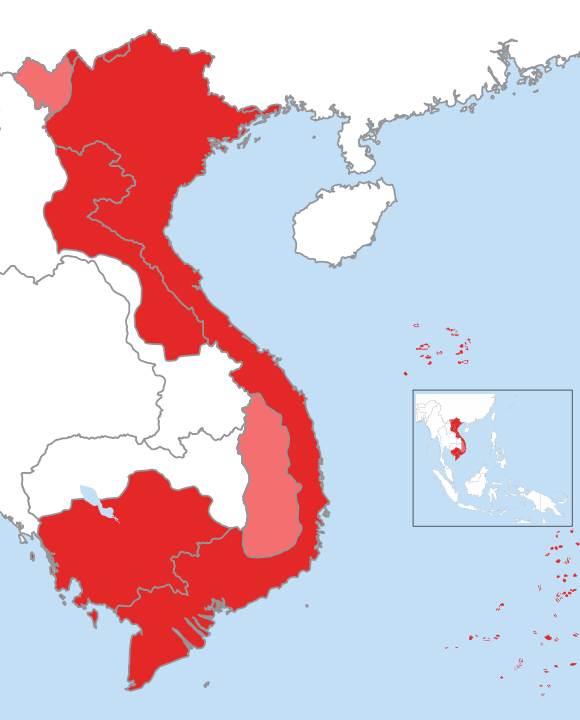
Map of the extent of the Vietnamese empire's power under Minh Mạng's rule

The Baiyue people, from which the modern Vietnamese people (also called "Viet" or "Kinh") are descended, have long inhabited a vast variety of land of what would be known as modern China, Vietnam and Laos. As for the result of migration, the Viet tribes moved southward and eventually established itself in what would be known as northern Vietnam and southern China today, which became the ancestral homeland of Vietnamese people. Later, there were northern expansions toward Chinese territory, and sea expeditions to gain control over the Malay peninsula, though it was short-lived. Nonetheless, during these expansions, Vietnamese imperial rulers adopted Vietnamization policy, hoping to subjugate and Vietnamize people from the land they conquered.

French imperialism at the 19th century resulted in the establishment of French Indochina, where French colonial rulers adopted a divide-and-rule policy, but this also resulted with Cambodia and Laos being fully absorbed into a much-larger Vietnamese nation. Though being equally ruled by France, in reality, the Vietnamese dominated political will in both Laos and Cambodia, and the economy of Vietnam was far bigger than its fellow French Indochinese colonies. This trend continued even when the French were expelled from Vietnam following the First Indochina War, only to be disrupted by the Vietnam War later on. However, once the Vietnam War ended, the Vietnamese communists, who emerged victoriously in this conflict, managed to control Laos and Cambodia through its communist puppets, as well as trying to expand into Thailand. In 1979, the Cambodian–Vietnamese War broke out when the Khmer Rouge under Pol Pot invaded Vietnam, but this resulted in a 10-year occupation of Cambodia by the Vietnamese. Following Đổi mới in 1986, when Vietnam reformed and rejoined the global community, Vietnam started to focus on its internal affairs and retreated from Laos and Cambodia.

== Greater Vietnamese irredentism ==
=== China and origin of Chinese civilizations ===
Due to historical conflict and numerous territorial changes with China, especially regarding Baiyue, some Vietnamese nationalists have irredentist claims to parts of southern China. Some pushed far as claiming the first founding civilization in the Yellow River Basin including the Xia, the Shang, and the Zhou dynasties being of Vietnamese/Baiyue origins.

=== Laos and Cambodia ===
Being fellow neighbors, Laos and Cambodia have long been seen as backwaters of Vietnam due to being strongly under prey of Vietnamese influence, even though Laos and Cambodia are culturally distinct from Vietnam.

In the past, Vietnam had fought and managed to control and influence both Laos and Cambodia, with the former experienced longer Vietnamese domination after several conflicts. Meanwhile, the latter was slowly absorbed to Vietnamese influence in 17th century, but it was not until 19th century that Vietnam finally established its control and wrecking Siam together. In all of Vietnam's irredentist sentiment to Laos and Cambodia, its sentiment toward Cambodia is the strongest and most hostile one, often led to conflict between two countries. The most recent Cambodian–Vietnamese War was an example.

Meanwhile, in recently, the East Laos (Vietnamese: Đông Lào) meme, which was made as a joke corresponding to the fact that Vietnam is the only country bordering Laos to the East, is often being used to (sarcastically) represent Vietnam and is frequently used by Vietnamese internet users during its looming tensions with China. Although the meaning is mostly memetic, it sometimes caused controversy that Vietnam attempted to reinforce its control of Laos by mimicking the latter's name, given Vietnam's large population and the state of Lao PDR is generally under significant Vietnamese influence, sometimes even considered as a Vietnam's puppet state by a number of Laotian ultra-nationalists and/or anti-communists.

There are also half-jokes made by Vietnamese ultranationalists about reviving a so-called Indochinese Union with Vietnamese dominance over Laos and Cambodia, comparable to the idea of Russia's major influence inside the Soviet Union.

=== Thailand, Myanmar and Malaysia ===
Vietnamese irredentism is also sometimes pointing to Thailand, Malaysia and Myanmar, though it directs the most to the former.

Its conflict with the Siamese, which began in 18th century, had been one of the prolonged war, in which Vietnam slowly transformed to become a Southeast Asian power despite Siamese efforts to prevent it. This had fostered a significant national fear of Siamese and later Thais about growing Vietnamese irredentist threat, which was enhanced by the outcome of Cambodian–Vietnamese War and subsequent Vietnamese military raids and occupation in Thai border. Thus, in Thailand always ran a fear of Vietnamese eventual occupation, leading to the country supporting Khmer Rouge to deter Vietnamese expansionism.

Vietnamese irredentism toward Malaysia was much weaker and less significant, and it was never documented in Vietnamese historical accords. However, during the 15th century, the Vietnamese, which proceeded the most powerful army in Southeast Asia, had planned for a naval expedition against Malacca Sultanate and launched naval attacks on Malay ships and sailors. Following the pressure by the Ming dynasty, the Vietnamese backtracked and eventually abandoned the plan to conquer Malacca.

=== Internal Vietnam ===
==== Champa ====
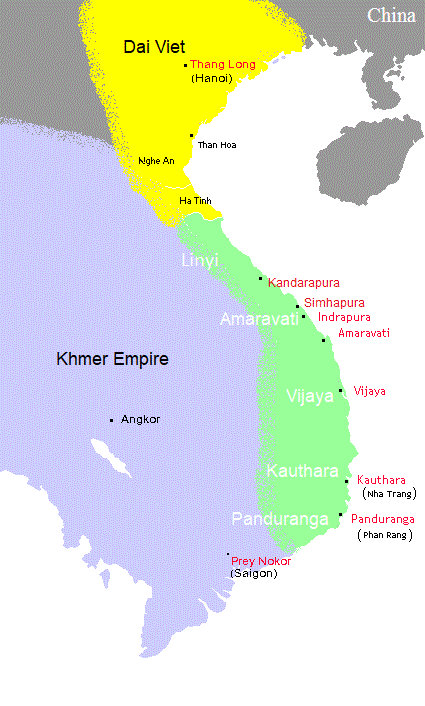
Map of Champa in green. It's Vietnam's first rival other than China when the Vietnamese regained independence before being incorporated at 1471 and smaller Cham Kingdoms went scattered until 19th century.

The Kingdom of Champa was once an ancient kingdom in what would be modern-day Central Vietnam, influenced by the extension of Indian civilization. The relationship between two, if not to say, often fluctuated between peace and hostility. However, with the end of the Fourth Chinese domination of Vietnam, increasing Vietnamese militarism and southward expansion had led to the demise of Champa and its eventual fate of being conquered at the end of the 1471 war. Since then, there had been a number of rebellions against Vietnamese rule by the Chams since and was marred by growing Islamization of Chams, the most severe happened in the 19th century when Katip Sumat uprising coincided with Ja Thak Wa uprising, where Islam was introduced as a weapon of resistance against Vietnamese Empire; and in 20th century when the United Front for the Liberation of Oppressed Races (FULRO) was established to fight off Vietnamese persecution. In response, the Vietnamese military began persecuting Chams and drafted them into its rank, while there were persecutions over their Hindu and Islamic faith.

==== Central Highlands ====
Map of Central Highlands. Vietnam conquered the land only in 19th century.

The Central Highlands was incorporated into Vietnamese territory by the end of 18th century but only got formal control from 19th century onward. For the first decades under Nguyễn dynasty, the Vietnamese paid little interest to the region and prohibited Vietnamese settlers from ever going here. But with the French conquest, the Vietnamese had taken significant interests due to large natural resources in the region. Its strategic location is also another important reason for Vietnam to begin to increase its control over the land. To counter growing Vietnamese nationalism, the French supported Christianization of Montagnards, which would serve as a pretext for future conflict.

Eventually, the outbreak of Vietnam War erupted the demographic imbalance when Vietnamese settlers became increasingly populous, displacing the indigenous Montagnards. This had influenced these people to take up arms and rebelled against Vietnamese, no matter the north or south. The United Front for the Liberation of Oppressed Races was established with object of fighting against Vietnamese imperialism. In response, both North Vietnam and South Vietnam maltreated the Montagnards, and the United States was accused of doing nothing to prevent it. The persecution trend continued even after 1975, and remains extremely severe. In addition, to finally reinforce its control, Vietnamese government, both in the past to present, has directly sponsored Vietnamese migration to Central Highlands, much to the dismay of Montagnards.

==== Mekong Delta ====
Map of Mekong Delta. Vietnam conquered the land only in 18th century. Vietnamese settlers however had begun to colonize it in 17th century.

The Mekong Delta had been historically under the Khmer Empire, where the Khmer Krom, a subgroup of the larger Khmer people, inhabited the land. Up until 17th century, the land had been mostly marked with little interests even during the height of the Khmer civilization. However, due to the decline of Cambodia and wars with Siam, the Cambodian court had to take refuge and neglected the Mekong Delta's interests. On the same time, due to southern expansion, Vietnamese settlers had begun to take over the Mekong Delta. The takeover began with most of its population were settlers, and later doubled by a large number of Chinese refugees fleeing from the Manchu Qing dynasty. These Chinese refugees went Vietnamized in majority and helped expanding Vietnamese military and political privileges over the Delta with the blessing from Nguyễn lords. There had been several attempts by Cambodian Court to restrict Vietnamese migration to even recovering of territory, but was unsuccessful. As for the result, Cambodia was never able to make any significant step, and lost the territory in the end of 18th century. The conquest meant that Vietnam acquired the longest sea border for any mainland Southeast Asian countries.

The Khmer Krom, which had traditionally aligned itself with Cambodia, were dissatisfied with Vietnamese rule and had tried to re-incorporate the land to Cambodia. As a consequence, Emperor Minh Mạng decided to Vietnamize the Khmer population "We must hope that their barbarian habits will be subconsciously dissipated, and that they will daily become more infected by Han [Sino-Vietnamese] customs." The trend was not prevented by the French even after French colonization. In 1949, French President Vincent Auriol, in a move that favored Vietnamese irredentism, granted the land to Vietnamese control. The Khmer Krom's dissatisfaction led to the fight against Vietnam during the Vietnam War, and allied with the FULRO. Ultimately, Khmer Krom began to face persecution, though in comparison to the Montagnards and Chams, was less severe.

=== Spratly and Paracel ===
Like many nations involving in the islands' disputes, Vietnam has been a major participant. For the Vietnamese, controlling these islands have been instrumental in reinforcing historical claim in a very divisive series of islands' claims containing the People's Republic of China, the Republic of China (Taiwan), the Philippines, Malaysia, and Brunei.

In Vietnamese irredentist version, the Paracel Islands were first discovered by a group of naval force working under the Nguyễn lords, known as Hoàng Sa group (hence the Vietnamese name), and this was done at 1686, while China was busy concentrating on its internal affairs. The same issue came with Spratly islands, with Vietnamese source claims to have been traced from 17th century.

During the Vietnam War, North Vietnam ceded its territorial claim over these islands to China, although China did not have any major military activities there until 1973, probably in order to maintain support from the Chinese and Soviets to reinforce for its military against the south and the United States. However, the 1974 Battle of the Paracel Islands was instrumental on letting the North to eventually withdraw its recognition of China's claims and rekindled back the territorial disputes over these islands, as the unified communist authority of Vietnam decided to inherit both the claim of the late Republic against China. Since then, the two nations later fought for control in the Johnson South Reef Skirmish, this time ended with another Chinese victory, but has left a denting legacy on eventual tensions between the two countries as South China Sea disputes evoked back from 2010s and further boosting irredentist sentiment.

== See also ==
- Vietnamese nationalism
- Anti-Vietnamese sentiment
