= Vietnamese nationalism =

Form of nationalism regarding the Vietnamese people and nation

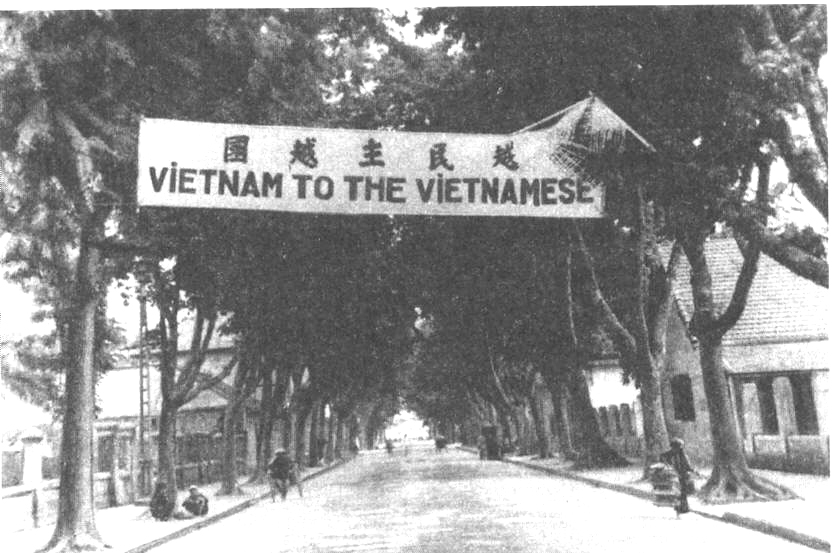
A street banner in Hanoi at the end of the World War II, as the French colonial forces were returning to Indochina.

Flag of North Vietnam (adopted in 1955), used by the Socialist Republic of Vietnam from 1976 to the present.

Flag of the State of Vietnam and South Vietnam, used from 1949 to 1975; still used among the Vietnamese diaspora.

Vietnamese nationalism (Vietnamese: chủ nghĩa dân tộc Việt Nam) is a form of nationalism that asserts the Vietnamese people as an independent nation. It encompasses a broad range of ideas and sentiments harbored by the Vietnamese people in regards with national identity.

Since the mid-20th century, the communists have portrayed themselves as the sole rightful leaders of Vietnamese nationalism to legitimize the authority of the Communist Party. By contrast, anti-communists asserted that the communists had betrayed true nationalists and that communism was antithetical to Vietnamese nationalism; they identified this anti-communist nationalism as chủ nghĩa quốc gia. Historical foreign domination has also created the fear that Vietnam may be "reconquered", which tends to fuel Vietnamese nationalism. Contemporary nationalist discourses in Vietnam emphasize anti-Chinese sentiment in various forms. Vietnam's current government propaganda is also regarded as a synthesis of socialism and nationalism.

== History ==
=== Founding myth ===
Semi-mythical figures such as the Hùng kings prior to Chinese rule in southern China and northern Vietnam played a role in shaping Vietnam as a separate nation in the modern era. Such origin myths were exploited by the Viet elite as early as the 15th century as a catalyst for identity formation and unification under an imperial state. Under French rule and post-colonial periods, these myths were integrated into the official historiography of Vietnam.

=== Nationalist historiography ===
The historiography of Vietnam under Chinese rule has been shaped significantly by both French colonial scholarship and postcolonial Vietnamese nationalist writing. Théophile Marie Legrand de la Liraye's book Notes historiques sur la nation Annamite (c. 1865) was the first to introduce the Western concept of nation in writing about the history of Vietnam. Since the late 19th century, several French authors had promoted the view that Vietnam had little of its own culture and borrowed it almost entirely from China. By portraying the Vietnamese as merely borrowers of civilization, the French colonisers situated themselves in a historical paradigm of "bringing civilization" to a "backwards region" of the world. French scholar Leonard Aurousseau argued that not only did Vietnam borrow culturally and politically from China, the population of Vietnam was also directly the result of migration from the Baiyue in China. This line of thought was followed by Joseph Buttinger, who authored the first English language history book on Vietnamese history. He believed that to fight off the Chinese, the Vietnamese had to become like the Chinese.

The national school of Vietnamese history, portrays the period in "a militant, nationalistic, and very contemporary vision through which emerged a hypothetical substratum of an original Vietnam that was miraculously preserved throughout a millennium of the Chinese presence." The national Vietnamese narrative depicts the Chinese as a corrupt and profit-driven people and merely the first of the foreign colonizing empires that were eventually driven from Vietnam. According to Catherine Churchman, this is not an entirely new historical tradition but a rewriting or updating of it, and has roots in Đại Việt, which portrayed itself as the Southern Empire equal to the Northern Empire (China). Đại Việt literati of the Trần and Lê dynasties sought an ancient origin for their autonomy prior to Chinese rule and traced their genealogy to Triệu Đà or the semi-legendary Hồng Bàng dynasty. They recorded that the Northern Empire suffered defeat for not respecting these views. However, scholars such as Nhi Hoang Thuc Nguyen argue that "the trope of a small country consistently repelling the China's cultural force is a recent, postcolonial, mid-20th-century construction". Publishing in 2024, Academics Xinru Ma and David C. Kang describe the nationalist narrative of struggle with China for autonomy as a meme. Ma and Kang write that this nationalist narrative "is a recent, twentieth-century nationalist narrative that was originated during a time of Vietnamese colonization by France and that was later aimed at uniting Vietnamese in struggles against larger imperial powers, including the United States."

Works by Japanese scholars in the 1970s as well as in the English language in the 1980s have taken on elements of the national school. Katakura Minoru's Chūgoku shihaika no betonamu emphasizes the innate characteristics of the Vietnamese people. Keith Taylor's The Birth of Vietnam (1983) asserts a strong continuity from the semi-legendary kingdoms of the Red River Plain to the founding of Đại Việt, which was the result of a thousand-year struggle against the Chinese that culminated in the restoration of Vietnamese sovereignty. Jennifer Holmgren's The Chinese Colonisation of Northern Vietnam uses Sinicization and Vietnamization as terms to refer to political and cultural change in different directions. Works following the national school of Vietnamese history retroactively assign Vietnamese group consciousness to past periods (Han-Tang era) based on evidence in later eras. The national school of Vietnamese history has remained practically unchanged since the 1980s and has become the national orthodoxy.

The argument for an intrinsic, intractable, and distinctly Southeast Asian Vietnamese identity in the Red River Plain throughout history has been categorized by Catherine Churchman as context, cultural continuity, and resistance. Context refers to the downplaying of similarities between Vietnam and China while emphasizing Vietnam's Southeast Asian identity in the postcolonial period. Cultural continuity refers to an intrinsic Vietnamese "cultural core" that has always existed in the Red River Plain since time immemorial . Resistance refers to the national struggle of the Vietnamese people against foreign aggressors. Proponents of this historical narrative, such as Nguyen Khac Vien, characterize the history of Vietnam under Chinese rule as a "steadfast popular resistance marked by armed insurrections against foreign domination", while opponents such as Churchman note the lack of evidence, anachronisms, linguistic problems, adherence to Chinese political and cultural norms, and similarities as well as differences with other peoples under Chinese rule.

The Vietnamese national narrative has introduced anachronisms in order to prove a unified Vietnamese national consciousness. The word Viet/Yue is often used to refer to an ethnic group when it had various meanings throughout history. There was no terminology to describe a Chinese-Vietnamese dichotomy during the Han-Tang period nor was there a term to describe a cohesive group inhabiting the area between the Pearl River and the Red River. During the Tang period, the indigenous people of Annan or Jinghai Circuit were referred to as the Wild Man (Wild Barbarians), the Li, or the Annamese (Annan people). In addition, the national history tends to have a narrow view limited to modern national boundaries, leading to conclusions of exceptionalism. Although it is true that the political situation in the Red River Plain was less stable than in Guangzhou to the north, such circumstances were not restricted to the area. The Vietnamese national narrative retroactively assigns any local rebellions, the rise of local dynasties, and their local autonomy with the motive of seeking national independence. Language has also been used as evidence for a distinct Vietnamese identity in the Han-Tang period. However, some research points to the formation of a Vietnamese language only afterward as the result of a creolization and language shift involving Middle Chinese.

=== Nam tiến ===
Beginning in the 20th century under the auspices of nationalism and racialism, modern Vietnamese historiography coined the term Nam tiến for what they believed to be a gradual, inevitable southern expansion of Vietnamese domains. The Nam tiến became one of the dominant themes of the narrative that Vietnamese nationalists created in the 20th century, alongside an emphasis on non-Chinese origin and Vietnamese homogeneity. Within Vietnamese nationalism and Greater Vietnam ideology, it served as a romanticized conceptualization of the Vietnamese identity, especially in South Vietnam and modern Vietnam.

During the Nam tiến period of the Nguyễn dynasty, Emperor Gia Long stated that "Hán di hữu hạn" (漢夷有限, "the Vietnamese and the barbarians must have clear borders") when differentiating between Khmer and the Vietnamese. Emperor Minh Mạng, the son of Gia Long, stated with regards to the Vietnamese forcing the ethnic minorities to follow Sino-Vietnamese customs that "We must hope that their barbarian habits will be subconsciously dissipated, and that they will daily become more infected by Hán [Civilised] customs." The Nguyễn dynasty under that influence once saw themselves as Hán nhân (Civilised people).

=== French Indochina and aftermath ===
Flag of the anti-communist Đại Việt Nationalist Party, also adopted by the Việt Nam Nationalist Party

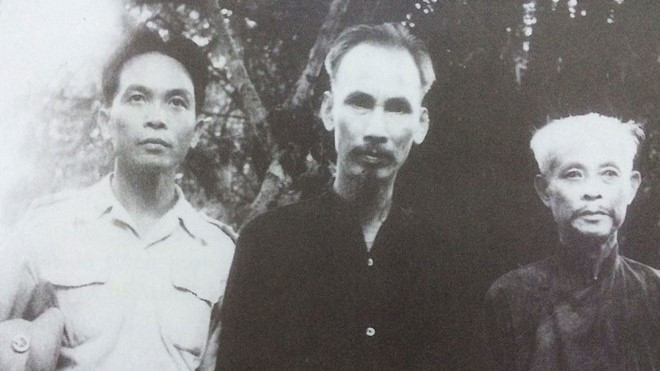
Hồ Chí Minh (middle), leader of the Vietnam's communist movement

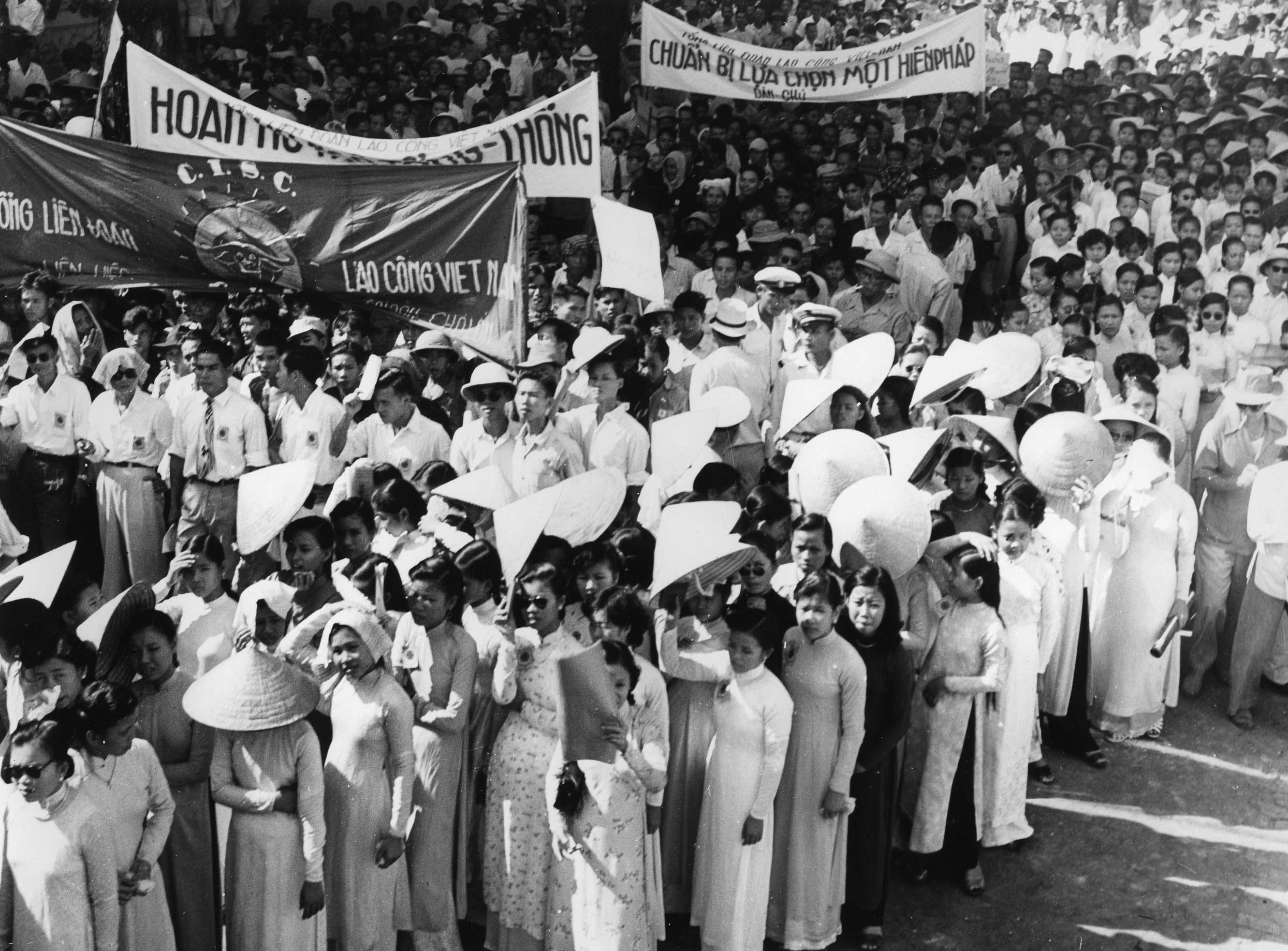
Political participation in South Vietnam, 1955

During French rule, when Vietnam was divided into three parts within French Indochina, Vietnamese nationalism became increasingly driven by anticolonialism as evidence of French atrocities emerged. Initially, there were attempts to modernise Vietnam with Western ways of thinking via France. The oppressive colonial rule, however, provoked radical politics, causing Ho Chi Minh to oppose the colonizers and find communism appealing during his time abroad. Although Ho remains both revered and controversial to this day, there were arguments that he was at first a nationalist who later turned to communism. Meanwhile, by the 1920s, republican ideas were embraced by Vietnamese elites, including both revolutionaries and reformers. Vietnamese independence movements became divided into communist and anti-communist camps as they disagreed about Vietnam's future government. Republican activists were far more popular than communists in the competition between the two groups for leadership of the nationalist movement.

Profound societal changes occurred during the Japanese occupation of French Indochina, and Vietnam’s right-wing nationalist groups, particularly the Đại Việt parties, promoted a strong national identity. The nationalist sentiment that had intensified during World War II paradoxically laid the groundwork for the communist-led Viet Minh, themselves cloaked in nationalism. Following Japan's surrender, they launched the August Revolution and proclaimed the Democratic Republic of Vietnam (DRV). After the communist suppression of opposition parties and the establishment of the State of Vietnam as a non-communist alternative to the DRV, the global Cold War reached Vietnam. Many religious communities also opposed the atheism of communism; Buddhists, Cao Đài and Hòa Hảo followers, and especially Catholics were largely nationalist.

=== Vietnam War and the modern era ===
During the Vietnam War (1955–75), Vietnamese nationalism was divided between anti-communist South Vietnam and communist-controlled North Vietnam, with the latter seeking independence under exclusive communist rule. Contrary to prevailing assumptions, North Vietnam's leaders were often motivated more by communist doctrine than by a broader nationalist orientation, whereas the diverse political forces in South Vietnam, despite reliance on American assistance, drew on a deep-rooted republicanism and pursued nation-building while resisting foreign interference.

The fractures persist to the present, sustained by enduring political differences. In particular, the display of the current socialist Vietnamese flag remains controversial within the Vietnamese diaspora, while the former nationalist Vietnamese flag is disparaged in contemporary Vietnam.

== Contemporary ==
=== Economy ===
There has been a growing movement among Vietnamese by boycotting Chinese products, using Vietnamese-made products instead, or tending to prefer Japanese or Western-made products over Chinese products. "Made in China" can be seen as mass-produced cheap products but sometimes also of inferior quality. The China-United States trade war since 2018 has also made other countries a beneficiary of the trade war.

=== Territorial ===
Contemporary nationalist concepts in Vietnam focus around China, where anti-Chinese sentiment has been fueled in various forms, from cultural and historical grievances, and at some stage, finding Mongolian and Manchurian rule "less civilised" or had to repel against several dynasties from the north, housing Song and Ming refugees due to these empires, to issues surrounding the South China Sea (known as East Sea in Vietnam). The contentious South China Sea disputes can become a flashpoint for nationalism to emerge. In 2023, the Barbie movie was banned over alleged drawings resembling the 9-dash or 11-dash line.

== See also ==
- Vietnamization (cultural assimilation)
- Culture of Vietnam
- History of Vietnam
- Việt-Nam Quốc-dân Đảng
- Đại-Việt Quốc-dân Đảng
- Phan Châu Trinh
- Phan Bội Châu
- Bảo Đại
- Trần Trọng Kim
- Hồ Chí Minh
- Lê Hữu Từ
- Ngô Đình Diệm
