= Émile Lemonnier =

French general (1893–1945)

Émile René Lemonnier
- Born: November 27, 1893; Château-Gontier
- Died: March 12, 1945 (aged 51); Lang Son, Japanese-occupied Indochina
- Burial place: Château-Gontier
- Military career
- Allegiance: France
- Branch: French Army
- Service years: 1912–1945
- Rank: Général
- Conflicts: First World War: Western Front; Second World War: Pacific War; Japanese occupation of French Indochina (executed)
- Awards: Legion of Honour

Émile René Lemonnier (November 27, 1893 – March 12, 1945) was a French Army general who served during World War I and World War II. Stationed in French Indochina in 1945, he was beheaded by the Japanese during their March coup d'état.

== Early life ==
Lemonnier was born to Émile Jean Lemonnier, a saddler by trade, and Marie Ernestine Fournier on November 27, 1893, in Château-Gontier in the Mayenne. He graduated from the College Château-Gontier in 1910 and entered the École Polytechnique in 1912.

== Military service ==
In 1914 Lemonnier was commissioned as a Second Lieutenant in the 25th Artillery Regiment and received several citations. In 1918, he transferred to the French Colonial Forces, subsequently serving with various regiments of the artillerie coloniale. In 1920 Lemonnier was made a Knight of the Legion of Honour. From 1925–1936 he served in French West Africa. He left France for the last time in 1937.

=== World War II and death ===
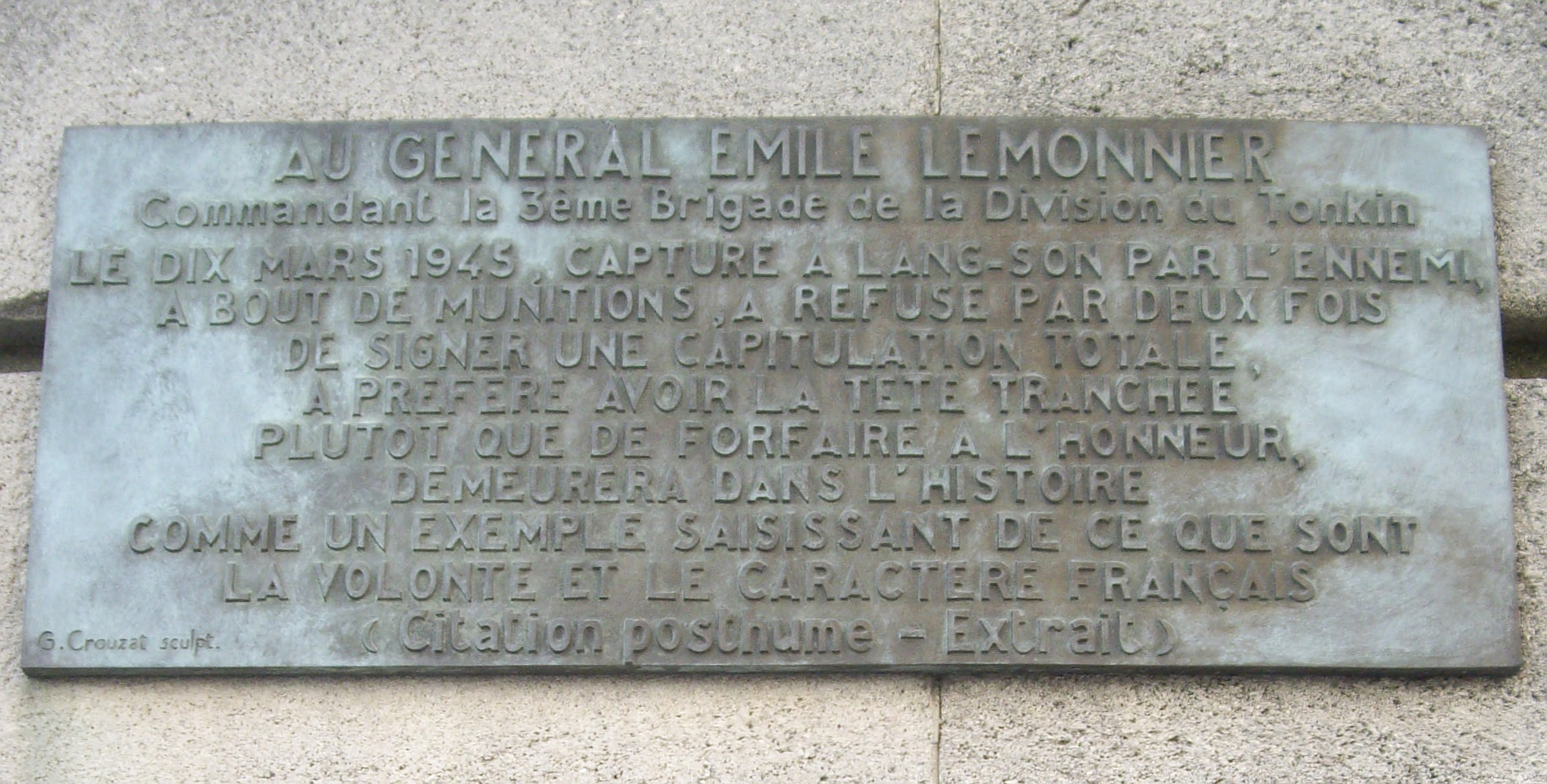
Commemorative plaque, Avenue du Général-Lemonnier, Paris

On March 9, 1945, General Lemonnier while commander of the Lang Son area received an invitation from the Japanese forces to a banquet of the headquarters of the division of the Imperial Japanese Army. Lemonnier declined to personally attend the event, although he allowed some of his staff to take part. The French staff officers present at the banquet were taken prisoner by the Japanese. Lemonnier was subsequently taken prisoner himself and ordered by a Japanese general to sign a document formally surrendering the forces under his command. Lemonnier refused to sign the documents causing the Japanese to take him outside of Lang Son where they forced him to dig graves along with French Resident-superior (Résident-général) (Tonkin) Camille Auphelle. Again Lemonnier was ordered to sign the surrender documents and again refused. The Japanese then beheaded him. Captain Kayakawa who had ordered Lemonnier's execution was sentenced to death by the French Permanent Military Tribunal in Saigon and executed after the war.

== Legacy ==
- Lemonnier was re-interred in France on March 3, 1950, at Château-Gontier.
- Camp Lemonnier, adjacent to Djibouti–Ambouli International Airport (now headquarters of the American Combined Joint Task Force – Horn of Africa) is named after him.
- On March 25, 1957, the former Rue des Tuileries (1st district of Paris) was renamed Avenue du Général-Lemonnier in his honor.
