= List of Axis war crime trials =

The following is a list of war crimes trials and tribunals brought against the Axis powers following the conclusion of World War II.

- Nazi Germany
  - Nuremberg Trials of the 24 most important leaders of the Third Reich; 1945–1946, held by the United Kingdom, the United States, the Soviet Union, and France.
    - Subsequent Nuremberg Trials
  - Dachau Trials; Judge Advocate General's Corps, United States Army tribunal held within the walls of the former Dachau concentration camp, 1945–1948
  - Belsen trials; held in Lüneburg, Germany against former personnel at the Bergen-Belsen concentration camp, 1945–1948
  - Minsk Trial; Soviet military tribunal against eighteen defendants accused of committing crimes in occupied Belarus
  - Riga Trial; trial of eight German military officials in connection with the Nazi occupation of Latvia
  - Borkum Island war crimes trial; held at the Ludwigsburg Palace in 1946
  - Werner Rohde trial; trial of eight former staff members (and one prisoner) at the Natzweiler-Struthof concentration camp
  - Auschwitz Trial; held in Kraków, Poland in 1947 against 40 SS-staff of the Auschwitz concentration camp death factory
  - Frankfurt Auschwitz Trials; trial of 22 staff members from Auschwitz, first criminal trial of Holocaust perpetrators under German jurisdiction
  - Belzec Trial; before the 1st Munich District Court in the mid-1960s of the eight SS-men of the Belzec extermination camp command
  - Majdanek Trials; the overall longest Nazi war crimes trial in history spanning over 30 years
  - Sobibor Trial; held in Hagen, Germany in 1965, concerning the Sobibor extermination camp officials
  - Chełmno Trials of the Chełmno extermination camp personnel; held in Poland and in Germany. The cases were decided almost twenty years apart
  - Supreme National Tribunal for Trial of War Criminals; active in Poland from 1946 to 1948
  - Eichmann trial; held in Jerusalem, Israel in 1961 against Adolf Eichmann, one of the chief organizers of the Holocaust
- Empire of Japan
  - International Military Tribunal for the Far East (Allied tribunal held in Tokyo for leaders of the Empire of Japan)
  - Nanjing War Crimes Tribunal (Tribunal created by the Republic of China for crimes committed in the Chinese theatre)
  - Shenyang and Taiyuan Special Military Tribunal (created by People's Republic of China for crimes committed in the Chinese theatre)
  - French Permanent Military Tribunal in Saigon (French military tribunal which investigated war crimes committed in French Indochina after the Japanese coup d'état in French Indochina.)
  - Philippine War Crimes Commission (American military tribunal in charge of the war crimes trials of Tomoyuki Yamashita and Masaharu Homma)
  - Yokohama War Crimes Trials, tried by the US Military Commission at Yokohama 1945–1949
  - Khabarovsk War Crime Trials, tribunal of Kwantung Army officials for use of chemical and biological weapons
- Other
  - Hungarian People's Tribunals
  - Post-World War II Romanian war crime trials
  - Bulgarian People's Tribunals;
  - Yugoslav People's Tribunals
  - War-responsibility trials in Finland
  - Czechoslovak People's Tribunals
  - Belgrade Process

Comparative table

Axis member	Total convicted	Executed
Germany	5,025 (by the Western Allies); ~10,000 (by the Soviet Union)	486+
Japan	>4,400	927
Bulgaria	2,618 (death sentences only)	1,576
Hungary	~27,000	189
Slovakia	65 (death sentences only)	27
Romania	Hundreds	4
