= French Indochina in World War II =

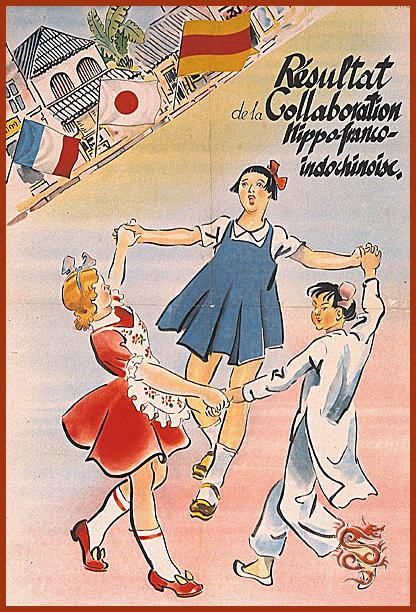
Japanese propaganda poster exalting collaboration between the Empire of Japan, Vichy France and the Vietnamese in Indochina, c. 1942

French Indochina (dark red) within the broader Japanese sphere of influence at its peak in 1942 (light red)

In mid-1940, Nazi Germany rapidly defeated the French Third Republic, and the colonial administration of French Indochina (modern-day Vietnam, Laos and Cambodia) passed to the French State (Vichy France). Many concessions were granted to the Empire of Japan, such as the use of ports, airfields, and railroads. Japanese troops first entered parts of Indochina in September 1940, and by July 1941 Japan had extended its control over the whole of French Indochina. The United States, concerned by Japanese expansion, started putting embargoes on exports of steel and oil to Japan from July 1940. The desire to escape these embargoes and to become self-sufficient in resources ultimately contributed to Japan's decision to attack on 7 December 1941, the British Empire (in Hong Kong and Malaya) and simultaneously the United States (in the Philippines and at Pearl Harbor, Hawaii). This led to the United States declaring war against Japan on 8 December 1941. The United States then joined the side of the British Empire, at war with Germany since 1939, and its existing allies in the fight against the Axis powers.

Indochinese communists had set up a covert headquarters in Cao Bằng Province in 1941, but most of the Vietnamese resistance to Japan, France, or both, including both communist and non-communist groups, remained based over the border, in China. As part of their opposition to Japanese expansion, the Chinese had fostered the formation of a Vietnamese nationalist resistance movement, the Dong Minh Hoi (DMH), in Nanking in 1935/1936; this included communists, but was not controlled by them. This did not provide the desired results, so the Chinese Communist Party sent Ho Chi Minh to Vietnam in 1941 to lead an underground centered on the communist Viet Minh. Ho was the senior Comintern agent in Southeast Asia, and was in China as an advisor to the Chinese communist armed forces. This mission was assisted by European intelligence agencies, and later the US Office of Strategic Services (OSS). Free French intelligence also tried to affect developments in the Vichy-Japanese collaboration.

In March 1945, the Japanese imprisoned the French administrators and took direct control of Vietnam until the end of the war. At that point, Vietnamese nationalists under the Viet Minh banner took control in the August Revolution, and issued a Proclamation of Independence of the Democratic Republic of Vietnam, but France took back control of the country in 1945–1946.

In looking at the broad picture of Southeast Asia at the end of World War II, the different political philosophies of the major actors clashed, including:

- The anti-communist Western powers, which viewed the French as the protector of the area from communist expansion.
- The nationalist and anti-colonialist movements that wanted independence from the French.
- The communists, both local and foreign, who sought to expand their influence

The lines between these movements were not always clear, and some alliances were of convenience. Prior to his death in 1945, Franklin D. Roosevelt made several comments about not wanting the French to regain control of Indochina.

== Pre-war events ==
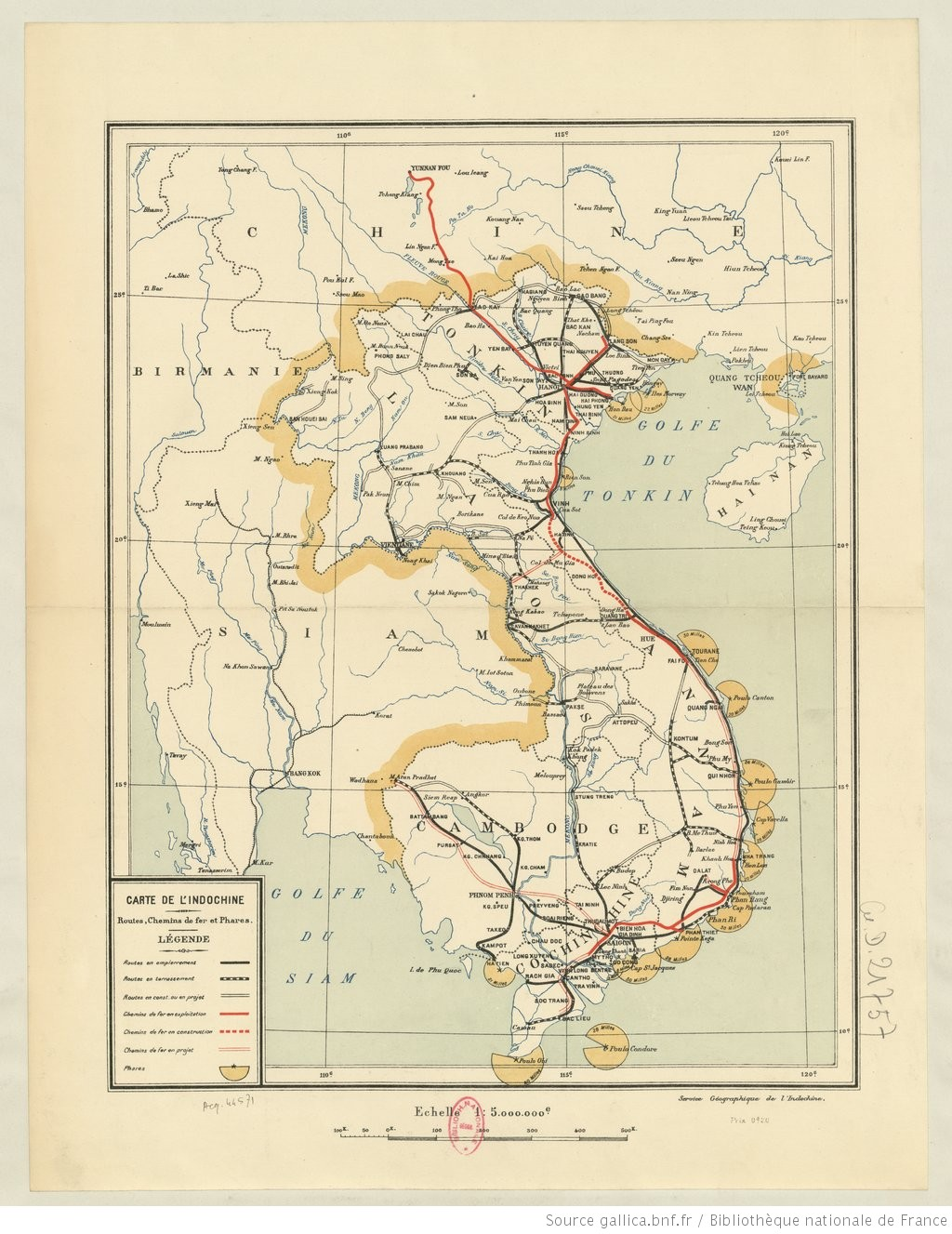
French Indochina c.1933

=== 1936 ===
In France itself, an anti-fascist Popular Front, included the center, Left, and Communists, stated a new policy for all French colonies, not just Indochina. A corresponding Indochinese Democratic Front formed.

An unpopular Governor General was replaced, encouraging Vietnamese nationalists to meet a French commission of Inquiry with lists of grievances. By the time the commission arrived, however, the Leftists were now not just members of an opposition, but part of a government concerned about Japanese expansion. Socialist Minister for the Colonies Marius Moutet, in September, sent a message to French officials in Saigon, "You will maintain public order...the improvement of the political and economic situation is our preoccupation but...French order must reign in Indochina as elsewhere." Moutet's Popular Front failed in actually liberalizing the situation, and he was to be involved in a greater failure a decade later.

=== 1937 ===
Throughout East and Southeast Asia, tensions had been building between 1937 and 1941, as Japan expanded into China. Franklin D. Roosevelt regarded this as an infringement on U.S. interests in China. The U.S. had already accepted an apology and indemnity for the Japanese bombing of the USS Panay, a gunboat on the Yangtze River in China.

=== 1938 ===
The French Popular Front fell, and the Indochinese Democratic Front went underground. When a new French government, still under the Third Republic, formed in August 1938, among its principal concerns were security of metropolitan France as well as its empire.

Among its first acts was to name General Georges Catroux governor general of Indochina. He was the first military governor general since French civilian rule had begun in 1879, following the conquest starting in 1858, reflecting the single greatest concern of the new government: defense of the homeland and the defense of the empire. Catroux's immediate concern was with Japan, who were actively fighting in nearby China.

=== 1939 ===
Both the French and Indochinese Communist parties were outlawed.

== World War II ==
=== 1940 ===
After the defeat of France, with an armistice on 22 June 1940, roughly two-thirds of the country was put under direct German military control. The remaining part of southeast France and the French colonies were under a nominally independent government, headed by World War I hero Marshal Philippe Pétain. Japan, not yet allied with Germany until the signing of the Tripartite Pact in September 1940, asked for German help in stopping supplies going through Indochina to China.

=== Increased Axis pressure ===
General Catroux, who had first asked for British support and had no source of military assistance from outside France, stopped the trade to China to avoid further provoking the Japanese. A Japanese verification group, headed by Issaku Nishimura entered Indochina on 25 June.

On the same day that Nishimura arrived, Vichy dismissed Catroux, for independent foreign contact. He was replaced by Vice Admiral Jean Decoux, who commanded the French naval forces in the Far East, and was based in Saigon. Decoux and Catroux were in general agreement about policy, and considered managing Nishimura the first priority. Decoux had additional worries. The senior British admiral in the area, on the way from Hong Kong to Singapore, visited Decoux and told him that he might be ordered to sink Decoux's flagship, with the implicit suggestion that Decoux could save his ships by taking them to Singapore, which appalled Decoux. While the British had not yet attacked French ships that would not go to the side of the Allies, that would happen at Mers-el-Kébir in North Africa within two weeks; it is not known if that was suggested to, or suspected by, Decoux. Deliberately delaying, Decoux did not arrive in Hanoi until 20 July, while Catroux stalled Nishimura on basing negotiations, also asking for U.S. help.

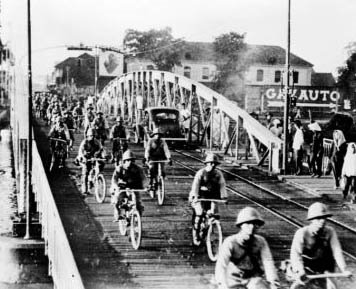
Japanese troops on bicycles advance into Saigon

Reacting to the initial Japanese presence in Indochina, on 5 July, the U.S. Congress passed the Export Control Act, banning the shipment of aircraft parts and key minerals and chemicals to Japan, which was followed three weeks later by restrictions on the shipment of petroleum products and scrap metal as well.

Decoux, on 30 August, managed to get an agreement between the French Ambassador in Tokyo and the Japanese Foreign Minister, promising to respect Indochinese integrity in return for cooperation against China. Nishimura, on 20 September, gave Decoux an ultimatum: agree to the basing, or the 5th Division, known to be at the border, would enter.

Japan entered Indochina on 22 September 1940. An agreement was signed, and promptly violated, in which Japan promised to station no more than 6,000 troops in Indochina, and never have more than 25,000 transiting the colony. Rights were given for three airfields, with all other Japanese forces forbidden to enter Indochina without Vichy consent. Immediately after the signing, a group of Japanese officers, in a form of insubordination not uncommon in the Japanese military, attacked the border post of Đồng Đăng, laid siege to Lạng Sơn, which, four days later, surrendered. There had been 40 killed, but 1,096 troops had deserted.

With the signing of the Tripartite Pact on 27 September 1940, creating the Axis of Germany, Japan, and Italy, Decoux had new grounds for worry: the Germans could pressure the homeland to support their ally, Japan.

Japan apologized for the Lạng Sơn incident on 5 October. Decoux relieved the senior commanders he believed should have anticipated the attack, but also gave orders to hunt down the Lạng Sơn deserters, as well as Viet Minh who had entered Indochina while the French seemed preoccupied with Japan.

Through much of the war, the French colonial government had largely stayed in place, albeit as Japan's puppets, as the Vichy government was on reasonably friendly terms with Japan. Japan had not entered southern Indochina until 1941, so the conflicts from 1939 to the fall of France had little impact on a colony such as Indochina. The Japanese permitted the French to put down nationalist rebellions in 1940.

=== 1941 ===
In July 1941, Japan successfully pressured the Vichy government into allowing the presence of their armed forces in Indochina. This was met with alarm by the United States, not only because it showed that the Japanese were willing to occupy other nations' colonial possessions in Asia, but also because Indochina had remained an important source of rubber and tin for the United States. Sumner Welles reported that President Roosevelt sought a compromise with the Japanese "to regard Indochina as a neutralized country the same way Switzerland had up to now by the powers as a neutralized country..." This suggestion was relayed to Kichisaburō Nomura, but was either not forwarded to Japanese leadership, or not considered before the outbreak of the Pacific War. When the Pacific War started Japan used Indochina a springboard to attack Malaya and the Philippines, and the Dutch East Indies.

==== Birth of the Việt Minh ====
In February 1941, Hồ Chí Minh returned to Vietnam and established his base in a cave at Pắc Bó in Cao Bằng Province, near the Sino-Vietnamese border. In May, the Indochinese Communist Party convened its eighth plenum where it placed nationalist goals ahead of communist goals: it prioritized the independence of Vietnam ahead of leading the communist revolution, fomenting class war, or aiding the workers. To that end, the plenum established the "League for the Independence of Vietnam" (Viet Nam Độc lập Đồng minh hội, Việt Minh for short). All Vietnamese political groups were welcomed to join the Viet Minh provided they supported ICP-led action against the Japanese and French colonizers. Hồ Chí Minh's greatest accomplishment during this period was unifying urban nationalist groups with his own peasant communist rebels and creating a single anti-colonial independence movement.

==== Vichy agreements with Japan about Indochina ====
Vichy France signed the Protocol Concerning Joint Defense and Joint Military Cooperation on 29 July. This agreement defined the Franco-Japanese relationship for Indochina, until the Japanese abrogated it in March 1945. It gave the Japanese a total of eight airfields, allowed them to have more troops present, and to use the Indochinese financial system, in return for a fragile French autonomy. In December, 24,000 Japanese troops sailed from Vietnam to Malaya.

=== 1942 ===
The Chinese organized the Đồng minh hội (ĐMH) coalition to gain intelligence from Indochina, a coalition dominated by the VNQDĐ. The only actual assets in Indochina, however, were Việt Minh.

During the Japanese occupation, even during French administration, the Việt Minh exiled to China had an opportunity to quietly rebuild their infrastructure. They had been strongest in Tonkin, the northern region, so moving south from China was straightforward. They had a concept of establishing "base areas" (chiến khu) or "safe areas" (an toàn khu) in the often mountainous jungle. Of these areas, the "homeland" of the VM was near Bắc Kạn Province. (see map)

Additional chiến khu developed in Yên Bái Province, Thái Nguyên Province (the "traditional" stronghold of the PCI), Pắc Bó in Cao Bằng Province, Ninh Bình Province and Đông Triều in Quảng Ninh Province. As with many other revolutionary movements, part of building their base was providing "shadow government" services. They attacked landlords and moneylenders, as well as providing various useful services. They offered education, which contained substantial amounts of political indoctrination.

They collected taxes, often in the form of food supplies, intelligence on enemy movement, and service as laborers rather than in money. They formed local militias, which provided trained individuals, but they were certainly willing to use violence against reluctant villagers. Gradually, they moved this system south, although not obtaining as much local support in Annam, and especially Cochinchina. While later organizations would operate from Cambodia into the regions of South Vietnam that corresponded to Cochin-China, this was well in the future.

Some of their most important sympathizers included educated civil servants and soldiers, who provided clandestine human-source intelligence from their workplaces, as well as providing counterintelligence on French and Japanese plans.

In August, while on a trip in southern China to meet with Chinese Communist Party officials, Hồ was arrested by the Kuomintang for two years.

=== 1943 ===
To make the Dong Minh Hoi an effective intelligence operation, the Chinese released Ho and put him in charge, replacing the previously Kuomintang-affiliated Vietnamese nationalists.

=== 1944 ===
In 1944, Ho, then in China, had requested a United States visa to go to San Francisco to make Vietnamese language broadcasts of material from the U.S. Office of War Information, the U.S. official or "white" propaganda. The visa was denied.

By August, Ho convinced the Kuomintang commander to support his return to Vietnam, leading 18 guerrillas against the Japanese. Accordingly, Ho returned to Vietnam in September with eighteen men trained and armed by the Chinese. Discovering that the ICP had planned a general uprising in the Việt Bắc, he disapproved, but encouraged the establishment of "armed propaganda" teams. These teams would participate in the Viet Minh's first battle against the French.

=== Vietnamese famine of 1944–1945 ===
From late 1944 and throughout 1945, a great famine ravaged across Vietnam, killing up to 2 million by some estimates. Its causes were attributed to natural disasters, the ongoing war, and poor administration by the French and the Japanese. The Viet Minh successfully directed public resentment toward the occupation powers and, as a result, transformed itself from a guerilla organization into a mass movement.

=== End of Western rule ===
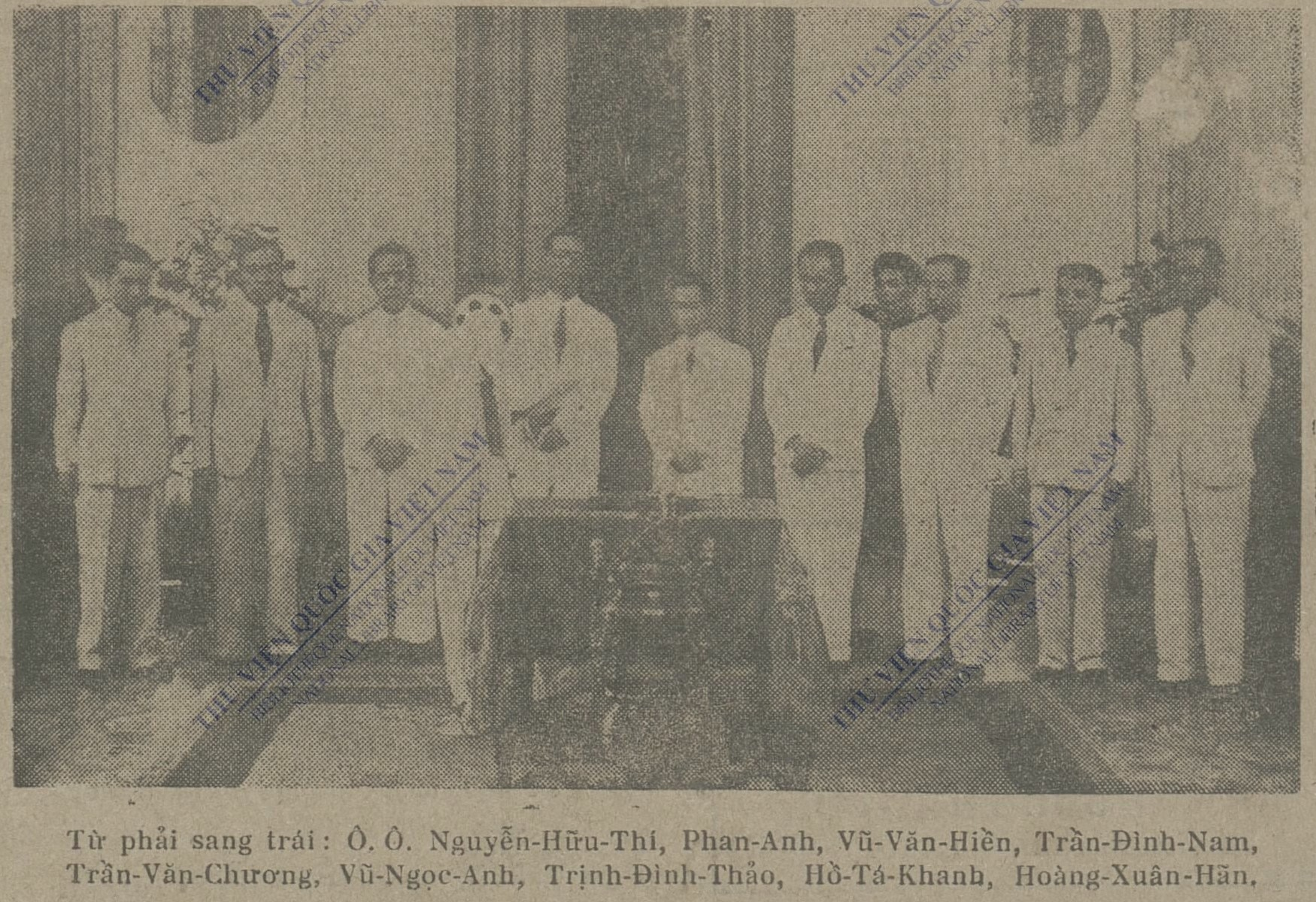
Trần Trọng Kim and other ministers in the Vietnamese imperial cabinet.

The Japanese revoked French administrative control on 9 March and took French administrators prisoner. They murdered those who refused to initially surrender and/or comply with their demands. This had the secondary effect of cutting off much Western intelligence about the Japanese in Indochina. They retained Bảo Đại as a nominal leader.

Even before there was a government of the newly proclaimed Empire of Vietnam, the French Provisional Government declared an intention, on 24 March, to have a French Union that would include an Indochinese Federation. While France would retain control over foreign relations and major military programs, the Federation would have its own military, and could form relationships outside the Federation, especially with China.

There would, however, continue to be a top French official, called High Commissioner rather than Governor General, but still in control. The five states, Annam, Cambodia, Cochin-China, Laos, and Tonkin would continue; there would be no Vietnam. In August, Admiral Georges d'Argenlieu would be named as High Commissioner, with General Leclerc as his military deputy.

Ho's forces rescued an American pilot in March. Washington ordered Major Archimedes Patti to do whatever was necessary to reestablish the intelligence flow, and the OSS mission was authorized to contact Ho. He asked to meet Gen. Claire Chennault, the American air commander, and that was agreed, under the condition he did not ask for supplies or active support.

The visit was polite but without substance. Ho, however, asked for the minor favor of an autographed picture of Chennault. Later, Ho used that innocent item to indicate, to other Northern groups, that he had American support.

Following the Japanese assumption of power in March 1945, they created a government under Bảo Đại. He invited Ngô Đình Diệm to become Prime Minister but, after receiving no response, turned to Trần Trọng Kim and formed a cabinet of French-trained but nationalist ministers.

His authority extended only to Tonkin and Annam; the Japanese simply replaced the former French officials in Cochinchina; Cao Đài and Hòa Hảo members also gained power there.

=== Japanese war crimes against the Vietnamese ===
In Hanoi on 15–20 April 1945 the Tonkin Revolutionary Military Conference of the Viet Minh issued a resolution that was reprinted on pages 1–4 on 25 August 1970 in the Nhân Dân journal. It called for a general uprising, resistance and guerilla warfare against the Japanese by establishing 7 war zones across Vietnam named after past heroes of Vietnam, calling for propaganda to explain to the people that their only way forward was violent resistance against the Japanese and exposing the Vietnamese puppet government that served them. The conference also called for training propagandists and having women spread military propaganda and target Japanese soldiers with Chinese language leaflets and Japanese language propaganda. The Viet Minh's Vietnamese Liberation Army published the "Resistance against Japan" (Kháng Nhật) newspaper. They also called for the creation of a group called "Chinese and Vietnamese Allied against Japan" by sending leaflets to recruit overseas Chinese in Vietnam to their cause. The resolution called on forcing French in Vietnam to recognize Vietnamese independence and for the DeGaulle France (Allied French) to recognize their independent and cooperate with them against Japan.

On 17 August 1970, the North Vietnamese National Assembly Chairman Trường Chinh reprinted an article in Vietnamese in Nhân Dân, published in Hanoi titled "Policy of the Japanese Pirates Towards Our People" which was a reprint of his original article written in August 1945 in No 3 of the "Communist Magazine" (Tạp Chí Cộng Sản) with the same title, describing Japanese atrocities like looting, slaughter and rape against the people of north Vietnam in 1945. He denounced the Japanese claims to have liberated Vietnam from France with the Greater East Asia Co-prosperity Sphere announced by Tojo and mentioned how the Japanese looted shrines, temples, eggs, vegetables, straw, rice, chickens, hogs and cattle for their horses and soldiers and built military stations and airstrips after stealing land and taking boats, vehicles, homes and destroying cotton fields and vegetable fields for peanut and jute cultivation in Annam and Tonkin. Japan replaced the French government on 9 March 1945 and started openly looting the Vietnamese even more in addition to taking French owned properties and stole watches, pencils, bicycles, money and clothing in Bắc Giang and Bắc Kạn. The Japanese tried to play the Vietnamese against the French and play the Laotians against the Vietnamese by inciting Lao people to killed Vietnamese as Lao murdered 7 Vietnamese officials in Luang Prabang and Lao youths were recruited to an anti-Vietnam organization by the Japanese when they took over Luang Prabang. The Japanese spread false rumours that the French were massacring Vietnamese at the time to distract the Vietnamese from Japanese atrocities. The Japanese created groups to counter the Viet Minh Communists like Việt Nam Bảo vệ đoàn (Vietnam protection group) and Việt Nam Ái quốc đoàn (Vietnam Patriotic Group to force Vietnamese into coolie labour, take taxes and rice and arrested ant-Japanese Vietnamese with their puppet government run by Tran Trong Kim. The Viet Minh rejected the Japanese demands to cease fighting and support Japan, so the Japanese implemented the Three Alls policy (San Kuang) against the Vietnamese, pillaging, burning, killing, looting, and raping Vietnamese women. The Vietnamese called the Japanese "dwarfed monsters" (Wa (Japan)) and the Japanese committed these atrocities in Thái Nguyên province at Dinh Hoa, Võ Nhai and Hung Son. The Japanese attacked the Vietnamese while masquerading as Viet Minh and used terror and deception. The Japanese created the puppet Việt Nam Phục quốc quân (Vietnam restoration army). and tried to disrupt the Viet Minh's redistribution and confiscation of property of pro-Japanese Vietnamese traitors by disguising themselves as Viet Minh and then attacking people who took letters from them and organizing anti-French rallies and Trưng sisters celebrations. Japanese soldiers tried to infiltrate Viet Minh bases with Viet Minh flags and brown trousers during their fighting. The Japanese murdered, plundered and raped Vietnamese and beheaded Vietnamese who stole bread and corn while they were starving according to their martial law. They shot a Vietnamese pharmacy student to death outside of his own house when he was coming home from guard duty at a hospital after midnight in Hanoi and also shot a defendant for a political case in the same city. In Thái Nguyên province, Võ Nhai, a Vietnamese boat builder was thrown in a river and had his stomach stabbed by the Japanese under suspicion of helping Viet Minh guerillas. The Japanese slit the abdomen and hung the Dai Tu mayor upside down in Thai Nguyen as well. The Japanese also beat thousands of people in Hanoi for not cooperating. Japanese officers ordered their soldiers to behead and burn Vietnamese. Some claimed that Taiwanese and Manchurian soldiers in the Japanese army were participating in the atrocities against the Vietnamese but Truong Chinh said that even if it was true Taiwanese and Manchurian soldiers were committing the rapes and killing, their Japanese officers were the ones giving the orders and participating along with them. Truong Chinh said that the Japanese wanted to plunder Asians for their own market and take it from the United States and Great Britain and were imperialists with no intent on liberating Vietnam.

Truong Chinh wrote another article on 12 September 1945, No 16 in Liberation Banner (Cờ Giải Phóng) which was also reprinted on 16 August 1970 in Nhân Dân. He commemorated the August Revolution against the Japanese; after the Japanese surrendered on 15 August 1945, the Viet Minh started attacking and slaughtering Japanese, disarming them in a nationwide rebellion on 19 August 1945. The Japanese had already disarmed the French and the Japanese themselves lost morale so the Viet Minh managed to seize control after attacking the Japanese. Viet Minh had begun fighting in 1944, when the French were attacked on Dinh Ca in October 1944 and in Cao Bang and Bac Can French were attacked by Viet Cong in November 1944 and the French and Japanese fought each other on 9 March 1945, so in Tonkin the Viet Cong began disarming French soldiers and attacking the Japanese. In Quang Ngai, Ba To, Yen Bai and Nghia Lo political prisoners escaped Japanese were attake din Son La by Meo (Hmong) tribesmen and in Hoa Binh and Lang Son by Muong tribesmen. Viet Minh took control of 6 provinces in Tonkin after 9 March 1945 within 2 weeks. The Viet Minh led a brutal campaign against the Japanese where many died from 9 March 1945 to 19 August 1945. Truong Chinh ended the article with a quote from Sun Yatsen, "The revolution is not yet won, All comrades must continue their al out efforts!"

On 26 September 1945 Ho Chi Minh wrote a letter calling for struggle against the French mentioning they were returning after they sold out the Vietnamese to the Japanese twice in 4 years.

An economic studies journal in North Vietnam, Nghiên Cứu Kinh Tế, on pages 60,-80 of issue No. 57 published an article accusing Japan of neocolonial economic policies trying to dominate Southeast Asia by exporting products and importing raw materials and that it was economically taking over Southeast Asia after the US after World War II, accusing Japan of doing it in Hong Kong, India, Pakistan, Indonesia, Malaysia, Singapore, Philippines, Thailand, South Vietnam, Taiwan and South Korea. The North Vietnamese warned Asians they had to "increase their vigilance over every activity of the Japanese financial magnates, increase their struggle against Japan's policies of economic aggression and promptly block its aggressive plots." in order to "clip the wings" of US imperialism. The article denounced the US Japanese alliance and Japanese neocolonialism and urged that anti-imperialists and socialists disrupt them in Japan.

The Japanese forced Vietnamese women to become comfort women and with Burmese, Indonesia, Thai and Filipino women they made up a notable portion of Asian comfort women in general. Japanese use of Malaysian and Vietnamese women as comfort women was corroborated by testimonies. There were comfort women stations in Malaysia, Indonesia, Philippines, Burma, Thailand, Cambodia, Vietnam, North Korea and South Korea. A Korean comfort woman named Kim Ch'un-hui stayed behind in Vietnam and died there when she was 44 in 1963, owning a dairy farm, cafe, US cash and diamonds worth 200,000 US dollars. 1 million Vietnamese were starved to death during World War II according to Thomas U. Berger. 2 billion US dollars' worth (1945 values) of damage, 148 million dollars of them due to destruction of industrial plants was incurred by Vietnam. 90% of heavy vehicles and motorcycles, cars and 16 tons of junks as well as railways, port installations were destroyed as well as one third of bridges. Some Japanese soldiers married Vietnamese women like Nguyen Thi Xuan and Nguyen Thi Thu and fathered multiple children with the Vietnamese women who remained behind in Vietnam while the Japanese soldiers themselves returned to Japan in 1955. The official Vietnamese historical narrative view them as children of rape and prostitution.

In the Vietnamese famine of 1944–1945, 1 to 2 million Vietnamese starved to death in the Red River Delta of northern Vietnam. In Phát Diệm the Vietnamese farmer Di Ho was one of the few survivors who saw the Japanese steal grain. The North Vietnamese government accused both France and Japan of the famine and said 1-2 million Vietnamese died. Võ An Ninh took photographs of dead and dying Vietnamese during the great famine.

On 25 March 2000, the Vietnamese journalist Trần Khuê wrote an article "Dân chủ: Vấn đề của dân tộc và thời đại" where he harshly criticized ethnographers and historians in Ho Chin Minh city's Institute of Social Sciences like Dr. Đinh Văn Liên and Professor Mạc Đường who tried to whitewash Japan's atrocities against the Vietnamese by portraying Japan's aid to the South Vietnamese regime against North Vietnam as humanitarian aid, portraying the Vietnam war against America as a civil war. changing the death toll of 2 million Vietnamese dead at the hands of the Japanese famine to 1 million and calling the Japanese invasion as a presence and calling Japanese fascists at simply Japanese at the Vietnam-Japan international conference. He accused them of changing history in exchange for only a few tens of thousands of dollars, and the Presidium of international Vietnamese studies in Hanoi did not include any Vietnamese women. The Vietnamese professor Văn Tạo and Japanese professor Furuta Moto both conducted a study in the field on the Japanese induced famine of 1945 admitting that Japan killed 2 million Vietnamese by starvation.

=== French war crimes against the Vietnamese ===
Vietnamese civilians were robbed, raped and killed by French soldiers in Saigon when they came back in August 1945. Vietnamese women were also raped in north Vietnam by the French like in Bảo Hà, Bảo Yên District, Lào Cai province and Phu Lu, which caused 400 Vietnamese who were trained by the French to defect on 20 June 1948. Buddhist statues were looted and Vietnamese were robbed, raped and tortured by the French after the French crushed the Viet Minh in northern Vietnam in 1947-1948 forcing the Viet Minh to flee into Yunnan, China for sanctuary and aid from the Chinese Communists. Vietnamese village notables told a French reporter:

"We know what war always is, We understand your soldiers taking our animals, our jewelry, our Buddhas; it is normal. We are resigned to their raping our wives and our daughters; war has always been like that. But we object to being treated in the same way, not only our sons, but ourselves, old men and dignitaries that we are."

=== Chinese occupation of Northern French Indochina ===
General Lu Han's 200,000 Chinese soldiers occupied north Vietnam starting August 1945. 90,000 arrived by October, the 62nd army came on 26 September to Nam Dinh and Haiphong. Lang Son and Cao Bang were occupied by the Guangxi 62nd army corps and the red river region and Lai Cai were occupied by a column from Yunnan. Vietnamese VNQDD fighters accompanied the Chinese soldiers. Ho Chi Minh ordered his DRV administration to set quotas for rice to give to the Chinese soldiers and rice was sold in Chinese currency in the red River delta. Lu Han occupied the French governor general's palace after ejecting the French staff under Sainteny. Chinese soldiers occupied northern Indochina north of the 16th parallel while the British under the South-East Asia Command of Lord Mountbatten occupied the south. Chiang Kai-shek deliberately withheld his crack and well trained soldiers from occupying Vietnam since he was going to use them to fight the Communists inside China and instead sent undisciplined warlord troops from Yunnan under Lu Han to occupy north Vietnam and Hanoi north of the 16th parallel to disarm and get Japanese troops to surrender.

Ho Chi Minh confiscated gold taels, jewelry and coins in September 1945 during "Gold Week" to give to Chinese forces occupying northern Vietnam. Rice to Cochinchina by the French in October 1945 were divided by Ho Chi Minh, and the northern Vietnamese only received one third while the Chinese soldiers were given two thirds by Ho Chi Minh. For 15 days elections were postponed by Ho Chi Minh in response to a demand by Chinese general Chen Xiuhe on 18 December 1945 so that the Chinese could get the Dong Minh Hoi and VNQDD to prepare. The Chinese left only in April–June 1946. Ho Chi Minh gave golden smoking paraphernalia and a golden opium pipe to the Chinese general Lu Han after gold week and purchased weapons with what was left of the proceeds. Starving Vietnamese were dying throughout northern Vietnam in 1945 due to the Japanese seizure of their crops by the time the Chinese came to disarm the Japanese and Vietnamese corpses were all throughout the streets of Hanoi and had to be cleaned up by students.

While Chiang Kai-shek, Xiao Wen (Hsiao Wen) and the Kuomintang central government of China was disinterested in occupying Vietnam beyond the allotted time period and involving itself in the war between the Viet Minh and the French, the Yunnan warlord Lu Han held the opposite view and wanted to occupy Vietnam to prevent the French returning and establish a Chinese trusteeship of Vietnam under the principles of the Atlantic Charter with the aim of eventually preparing Vietnam for independence and blocking the French from returning. Ho Chi Minh sent a cable on 17 October 1945 to American President Harry S. Truman calling on him, Generalissimo Chiang Kai-shek, Premier Stalin and Premier Attlee to go to the United Nations against France and demand France not be allowed to return to occupy Vietnam, accusing France of having sold out and cheated the Allies by surrendering Indochina to Japan and that France had no right to return.

Ho Chi Minh dumped the blame on Dong Minh Hoi and VNDQQ for signing the agreement with France for returning its soldiers to Vietnam after he had to do it himself. Ho Chi Minh's Viet Minh tried to organize welcome parades for Chinese soldiers in northern Vietnam and covered for instances of bad behavior by warlord soldiers, trying to reassure Vietnamese that the warlord troops of Lu Han were only there temporarily and that China supported Vietnam's independence. Viet Minh newspapers said that the same ancestors (huyết thống) and culture were shared by Vietnamese and Chinese and that the Chinese heroically fought Japan and changed in the 1911 revolution and was attacked by western imperialists so it was "not the same as feudal China".

Ho Chi Minh forbade his soldiers like Trần Huy Liệu in Phú Thọ from attacking Chinese soldiers and Ho Chi Minh even surrendered Vietnamese who attacked Chinese soldiers to be executed as punishment in the Ro-Nha incident in Kiến An district on 6 March 1946 after Hồ Đức Thành and Đào Văn Biểu, special commissioners sent from Hanoi by Ho's DRV examined the case. Ho Chi Minh appeased and granted numerous concessions to the Chinese soldiers to avoid the possibility of them clashing with the Viet Minh, with him ordering Vietnamese not to carry out anything against Chinese soldiers and pledging his life on his promise, hoping the Chinese would disarm the Japanese soldiers and finish their mission as fast as possible.

Chinese communist guerilla leader Chu Chia-pi came into northern Vietnam multiple times in 1945 and 1948 and helped the Viet Minh fight against the French from Yunnan. Other Chinese Communists also did the same.

=== Japanese soldiers in French Indochina after 1945 ===
After 1945 a number of Japanese soldiers would stay behind in French Indochina, several of them took Vietnamese war brides and would sire children with them (Hāfu). Many of these leftover Japanese soldiers would work with Hồ Chí Minh and the Indochinese Communist Party after the war to fight against French colonialism.

In 1954, the Vietnamese government had ordered the Japanese soldiers to return home. They were “encouraged” to leave their families behind effectively abandoning their war children in Vietnam.

=== French Permanent Military Tribunal in Saigon ===
The French Permanent Military Tribunal in Saigon, also known as Saigon Trials, was a war crimes tribunal which held 39 separate trials against suspected Japanese war criminals between October 1946 and March 1950.

On 9 March 1946, the French Permanent Military Tribunal in Saigon (FPMTS) was set up to investigate conventional war crimes ("Class B") and crimes against humanity ("Class C") committed by the Japanese forces after the 9 March 1945 coup d'état. The FPMTS examined war crimes committed between 9 March 1945 and 15 August 1945. The FPMTS tried a total of 230 Japanese defendants in 39 separate trials, taking place between October 1946 and March 1950. According to Chizuru Namba, 112 of the defendants received prison sentences, 63 were executed, 23 received life imprisonment and 31 were acquitted. Further 228 people were condemned in absentia.

Its scope was limited to war crimes committed against the French population of French Indochina after the Japanese coup d'état in French Indochina. Unlike other war crime tribunals in South East Asia no persecutions were made for war crimes against Indochina's native population. FPMTS served as an instrument of French foreign policy, aiming to highlight France as a victim of Japanese aggression while simultaneously showcasing the ability of the colonial authorities to govern the region.

Shifts in French foreign policy during the Cold War and disruptions caused by the First Indochina War caused the number of convictions to dwindle. As judges opted to discontinue criminal charges against the defendants or commuted their sentences.

== Cambodia in World War II ==
Following Japan's entry into Indochina on 22 September 1940, the Thai government, under the pro-Japanese leadership of Field Marshal Plaek Phibunsongkhram, and strengthened by virtue of its treaty of friendship with Japan, invaded French Protectorate of Cambodia's western provinces to which it had historic claims. Following the Franco-Thai War, Tokyo hosted the signature of a treaty on 9 May 1941 that formally compelled the French to relinquish one-third of the surface area of Cambodia with almost half a million citizens.

In August 1941, the Imperial Japanese Army entered the French protectorate of Cambodia and established a garrison that numbered 8,000 troops. Despite their military presence, the Japanese authorities allowed Vichy French colonial officials to remain at their administrative posts but in 1945, in the closing stages of World War II, Japan made a coup de force that temporarily eliminated French control over Indochina. The French colonial administrators were relieved of their positions, and French military forces were ordered to disarm. The aim was to revive the support of local populations for Tokyo's war effort by encouraging indigenous rulers to proclaim independence.

On 9 March 1945, young king Norodom Sihanouk proclaimed an independent Kingdom of Kampuchea, following a formal request by the Japanese. The Japanese occupation of Cambodia ended with the official surrender of Japan in August 1945 and the Cambodian puppet state lasted until October 1945.

Some supporters of the kingdom's prime minister Son Ngoc Thanh escaped to north-western Cambodia, then still under Thai control, where they banded together as one faction in the Khmer Issarak movement. Though their fortunes rose and fell during the immediate postwar period, by 1954 the Khmer Issarak operating with the Viet Minh by some estimates controlled as much as 50 percent of Cambodia's territory.

King Sihanouk reluctantly proclaimed a new constitution on 6 May 1947. While it recognized him as the "spiritual head of the state", it reduced him to the status of a constitutional monarch of a Cambodia within the French Union.

== Laos during World War II ==
Thai Prime Minister Plaek Phibunsongkhram had plans to unify all Tai peoples, including the Lao, under one nation. Following the Franco-Thai War, Japan compelled the Vichy French colonial government to cede parts of the French Protectorate of Laos to Thailand.

In order to maintain support and expel both the Japanese and Thai, colonial governor Jean Decoux encouraged the rise of the Lao nationalist Movement for National Renovation but, in the south of the country, the Lao Sēri movement was formed in 1944 and was not supportive of the French.

In March 1945, Japan dissolved French control over its Indochinese colonies and large numbers of French officials in Laos were then imprisoned. King Sisavang Vong was forced into declaring Laotian independence on 8 April and accepting the nation in the Greater East Asia Co-Prosperity Sphere. At the same time, remaining French officials and civilians withdrew to the mountains to regroup and join a growing Laotian insurgency led by Crown Prince Savang Vatthana against the Japanese, which occupied Vientiane in March 1945. Japan continued to rule Laos directly despite constant civil unrest until it was forced to withdraw in August 1945.

Following the Japanese surrender, Prince Phetsarath Rattanavongsa made an attempt to convince King Savang to officially unify the country and declare the treaty of protection with the French invalid because the French had been unable to protect the Lao from the Japanese. However, King Savang said that he intended to have Laos resume its former status as a French colony.

In October 1945, supporters of Laotian independence announced the dismissal of the king and formed the new government of Laos, the Lao Issara, to fill up the power vacuum of the country. However, the Lao Issara was bankrupt and ill-equipped, and could only await the inevitable French return. At the end of April 1946 the French took Vientiane, by May they had entered Luang Prabang, and the Lao Issara leadership fled into exile in Thailand. On 27 August 1946, the French formally endorsed the unity of Laos as a constitutional monarchy within the French Union.

== U.S. postwar policy ==
Franklin D. Roosevelt had expressed a strong preference for national self-determination, and was not notably pro-French. Cordell Hull's memoirs say that Roosevelt

entertained strong views on independence for French Indo-China. That French dependency stuck in his mind as having been the springboard for the Japanese attack on the Philippines, Malaya, and the Dutch East Indies. He could not but remember the devious conduct of the Vichy Government in granting Japan the right to station troops there, without any consultation with us but with an effort to make the world believe we approved.

After his death, however, the Truman administration experienced very real confrontations such as the Berlin Blockade in 1948–1949, in which the French were allies in dealing with the Blockade. Harry S. Truman saw French forces as necessary allies in the defense of Western Europe from the Soviet expansion that had already taken much of Eastern Europe. The rise of the Chinese Communists in 1949 and the outbreak of the Korean War in 1950 strengthened the hand of those who saw resistance to Communism in East and Southeast Asia as dominating all other issues there. Ousted Chinese Kuomintang under Chiang Kai-shek, exiled to Taiwan, had strong U.S. political allies such as Claire Chennault. Increasingly, and especially with the rise of Joe McCarthy, there was also, at the public level, a reflexive condemnation of anything with the slightest Communist connection, or even generally leftist.

During this period, France was perceived as more and more strategic to Western interests, and, both to strengthen it vis-a-vis the Soviet Union and Western Union, and against the perceived threat of Ho and the Chinese Communists, the U.S. would support French policy. Vietnamese nationalism or the discouragement of colonialism was really not a matter of consideration.

Laos, also a proto-state in the French Union, became of concern to the U.S. After the Japanese were removed from control of the Laotian parts of Indochina, three Lao princes created a movement to resist the return of French colonial rule. Within a few years, Souvanna Phouma returned and became prime minister of the colony. Souphanouvong, seeing the Viet Minh as his only potential ally against the French, announced, while in the Hanoi area, the formation of the "Land of Laos" organization, or Pathet Lao. Unquestionably, the Pathet Lao were Communist-affiliated. Nevertheless, they soon became a focus of U.S. concern, which, in the Truman and Eisenhower administrations, was more focused on anticommunism than any nationalist or anticolonial movement.

In contrast with other Asian colonies like India, Burma, the Philippines and Korea, Vietnam was not given its independence after the war. As in Indonesia (the Dutch East Indies), an indigenous rebellion demanded independence. While the Netherlands was too weak to resist the Indonesians, the French were strong enough to just barely hold on. As a result, Ho and his Viet Minh launched a guerrilla campaign, using Communist China as a sanctuary when French pursuit became hot.

== Viet Minh insurgency ==
Just after the Japanese surrender, before the Japanese-imprisoned French returned to their desks, Vietnamese guerrillas, under Ho Chi Minh, had seized power in Hanoi and shortly thereafter demanded and received the abdication of the apparent French puppet, Emperor Bảo Đại. This would not be the last of Bảo Đại.

In August 1945, two three-man French teams, under Colonel Henri Cedile, the Commissioner for Cochin China, and Major Pierre Messmer, Commissioner for northern Indochina, parachuted, from U.S. aircraft, into Indochina.

Reporting to High Commissioner d'Argenlieu, they were the first new French representatives. Cedile was almost immediately given to the Japanese. He was driven to Saigon, seminude, as a prisoner. Messmer was held by Vietnamese, and his team was given poison; one died before they escaped to China. Jean Sainteny later became the Commissioner for the north.

These were the first of the officers who would replace the French officials that had worked under Vichy rule. High officers, such as Admiral Decoux, would be sent back to France and sometimes tried for collaboration, but Cedile and Sainteny generally kept the French lower-level staff.

Earlier in 1945, Pham Ngoc Thach, deputy minister in Ho's personal Office of the President, had met, in Saigon, with U.S. OSS Lieutenant-Colonel A. Peter Dewey, along with Pham Van Bach, to try to negotiate with the French. Both the Vietnamese and French sides were factionalized. Adding to the confusion was the British Gurkha force under Major-General Douglas Gracey, who refused to let Dewey fly a U.S. flag on his car. Dewey was killed by accident at a Viet Minh roadblock in September.

=== August revolution ===
After the August Revolution took place throughout Vietnam, Ho Chi Minh declared independence in September. In a dramatic speech, he began with

All men are created equal. The Creator has given us certain inalienable rights: the right to Life, the right to be Free, and the right to achieve Happiness...These immortal words are taken from the Declaration of Independence of the United States of America in 1776. In a larger sense, this means that: all the peoples of the world are equal; all the people have the right to live, to be happy, to be free. turning to the Declaration of the French Revolution in 1791, "It also states Men are born, must be free, and have equal rights. These are undeniable truths.

Ho's declaration had none but emotional impact; the French soon reestablished their authority after the Japanese surrendered. Cochin China, at this time, was far less organized than Tonkin. Cao Đài set up a state around Tây Ninh, while Hòa Hảo declared one in the Cần Thơ area. These sects, along with a non-Viet Minh Trotskyist faction, formed the United National Front (UNF), which demonstrated on 21 August. The Viet Minh, however, called for the UNF to accept its authority, else let the French to declare all Vietnamese nationalism a Japanese proxy, and the UNF tentatively accepted this on the 25th.

The non-Communist nationalists became increasingly suspicious believing the Viet Minh Committee of the South was cooperating with Colonel Cedile. Mass demonstrations took place in Saigon on the 2nd, and shots were fired at it; the perpetrators were not identified.

Through the OSS Patti mission, often through emissaries, from the fall of 1945 to the fall of 1946, the United States received a series of communications from Ho Chi Minh depicting calamitous conditions in Vietnam, invoking the principles proclaimed in the Atlantic Charter and in the Charter of the United Nations, and pleading for U.S. recognition of the independence of the Democratic Republic of Vietnam (DRV), or — as a last resort — trusteeship for Vietnam under the United Nations.

British and French troops landed in Saigon on 12 September, with their commander, MG Douglas Gracey, arriving the next day. Gracey's headquarters instructed him, on the 13th, to exercise control only in limited areas, at French request, and after approval by the Southeast Asia [theater] Command under Field Marshal Sir William Slim. He was responsible for taking the Japanese surrender, and acting in temporary command of both British and French troops.

Cedile, on 18 September, asked Dewey, in Saigon, to try to head off the threatened Viet Minh general strike. Dewey met with Thach and other Vietnamese, and took back the message "it would be extremely difficult, at [this] point in time to control the divergent political factions — not all pro-Viet Minh, but all anti-French."

On 21–22 September 1945, British Gurkhas, under Gracey, took the central prison back from the Japanese, releasing French paratroopers. Cedile, with those paratroopers, captured several Japanese-held police stations on the 22nd, and then took control of the administrative areas on the 23rd. Some Viet Minh guards were shot. French control was reasserted.

Patti's guidance was that the U.S. had essentially given up the idea of a trusteeship, but still, at the U.N. foundation conferences, the U.S. was in favor of gradual independence. But while the U.S. took no action on Ho's requests, it was also unwilling to aid the French.

It has been suggested that the Viet Minh accepted a significant number of Japanese troops, estimated by Goscha as at least 5,500, who had no immediate way to get back to Japan and often had ties to the local culture; their experience in a conventional military would have been seen as valuable.

== See also ==
- History of Cambodia
- History of Laos
- History of Vietnam
- Allied post-war occupation of Vietnam
- Indochina wars

== Bibliography ==
- Marr, David G. (1995). Vietnam 1945: The Quest for Power. University of California Press. doi:10.1525/9780520920392. ISBN 9780520078338. (Paperback 1997)
- Tachikawa, Kyoichi (2001). "Independence Movement in Vietnam and Japan during WWII" (PDF). NIDS Security Reports. 2: 93–115.
- Jennings, Eric T. (2001). Vichy in the Tropics: Petain's National Revolution in Madagascar, Guadeloupe, and Indochina, 1940–1944. Stanford University Press. ISBN 0804750475.
- Raffin, Anne (2002). "The integration of difference in French Indochina during World War II: Organizations and ideology concerning youth". Theory and Society. 31 (3): 365–390. doi:10.1023/A:1016200204704. S2CID 141484930.
- Nguyễn Thế Anh (2002). "The Formulation of the National Discourse in 1940–45 Vietnam". Journal of International and Area Studies. 9 (1): 57–75. JSTOR 43107057.
- Tran My-Van (1996). "Japan and Vietnam's Caodaists: A Wartime Relationship (1939–45)". Journal of Southeast Asian Studies. 27 (1): 179–193. doi:10.1017/S0022463400010778. S2CID 154287123.
- Tran My-Van (2003). "Beneath the Japanese Umbrella: Vietnam's Hòa Hảo during and after the Pacific War". Crossroads: An Interdisciplinary Journal of Southeast Asian Studies. 17 (1): 60–107. JSTOR 40860807.
- Guillemot, François (2003). "Vietnamese Nationalist Revolutionaries and the Japanese Occupation: The Case of the Dai Viet Parties (1936–1946)". In Narangoa, Li; Cribb, Robert (eds.). Imperial Japan and National Identities in Asia, 1895–1945. RoutledgeCurzon. pp. 221–248. ISBN 9780700714827.
- Shiraishi, Masaya (2004). The Vietnamese Phuc Quoc League and the 1940 Insurrection. Working Paper. Vol. 14. Center of Excellence–Contemporary Asian Studies, Waseda University.
- Jennings, Eric T. (2004). "Conservative Confluences, "Nativist" Synergy: Reinscribing Vichy's National Revolution in Indochina, 1940–1945". French Historical Studies. 27 (3): 601–635. doi:10.1215/00161071-27-3-601. JSTOR 40324405. S2CID 154414080.
- Sager, Paul (2008). "Youth and Nationalism in Vichy Indochina". Journal of Vietnamese Studies. 3 (3): 291–301. doi:10.1525/vs.2008.3.3.291.
- Namba, Chizuru (2012). Français et Japonais en Indochine, 1940–1945: Colonisation, propagande et rivalité culturelle. Paris: Karthala. ISBN 9782811106744.
- Verney, Sébastien (2012). L'Indochine sous Vichy: Entre Révolution nationale, collaboration et identités nationales 1940–1945. Paris: Riveneuve. ISBN 9782360130740.
- Shiraishi, Masaya; Nguyễn Văn Khánh; Lockhart, Bruce M., eds. (2017). Vietnam–Indochina–Japan Relations during the Second World War: Documents and Interpretations. Waseda University Institute of Asia-Pacific Studies. 'Contents'. International Conference at Vietnam National University, Hanoi (September 2015).
- Keith, Charles (2017). "Vietnamese Collaborationism in Vichy France". The Journal of Asian Studies. 76 (4): 987–1008. doi:10.1017/S0021911817000791. S2CID 164481170.
- Namba, Chizuru (2019). "The French Colonization and Japanese Occupation of Indochina during the Second World War: Encounters of the French, Japanese, and Vietnamese". Cross-Currents: East Asian History and Culture Review (32): 74–96. Archived from the original on 9 November 2021.
- Schoepfel, Ann-Sophie (2014). "The War Court as a Form of State Building: The French Prosecution of Japanese War Crimes at the Saigon and Tokyo Trials". In Cheah, Wui Ling; Yi, Ping (eds.). Historical Origins of International Criminal Law: Volume 2. Torkel Opsahl Academic. pp. 119–141. ISBN 978-82-93081-13-5.
- Schoepfel, Ann-Sophie (2016). "Justice and Decolonization: War Crimes on Trial in Saigon, 1946–1950". In von Lingen, Kerstin (ed.). War Crimes Trials in the Wake of Decolonization and Cold War in Asia, 1945-1956. Palgrave Macmillan. pp. 167–194. ISBN 978-3-319-42987-8.
