= French Permanent Military Tribunal in Saigon =

1946–1950 war crimes tribunal against Japanese suspects

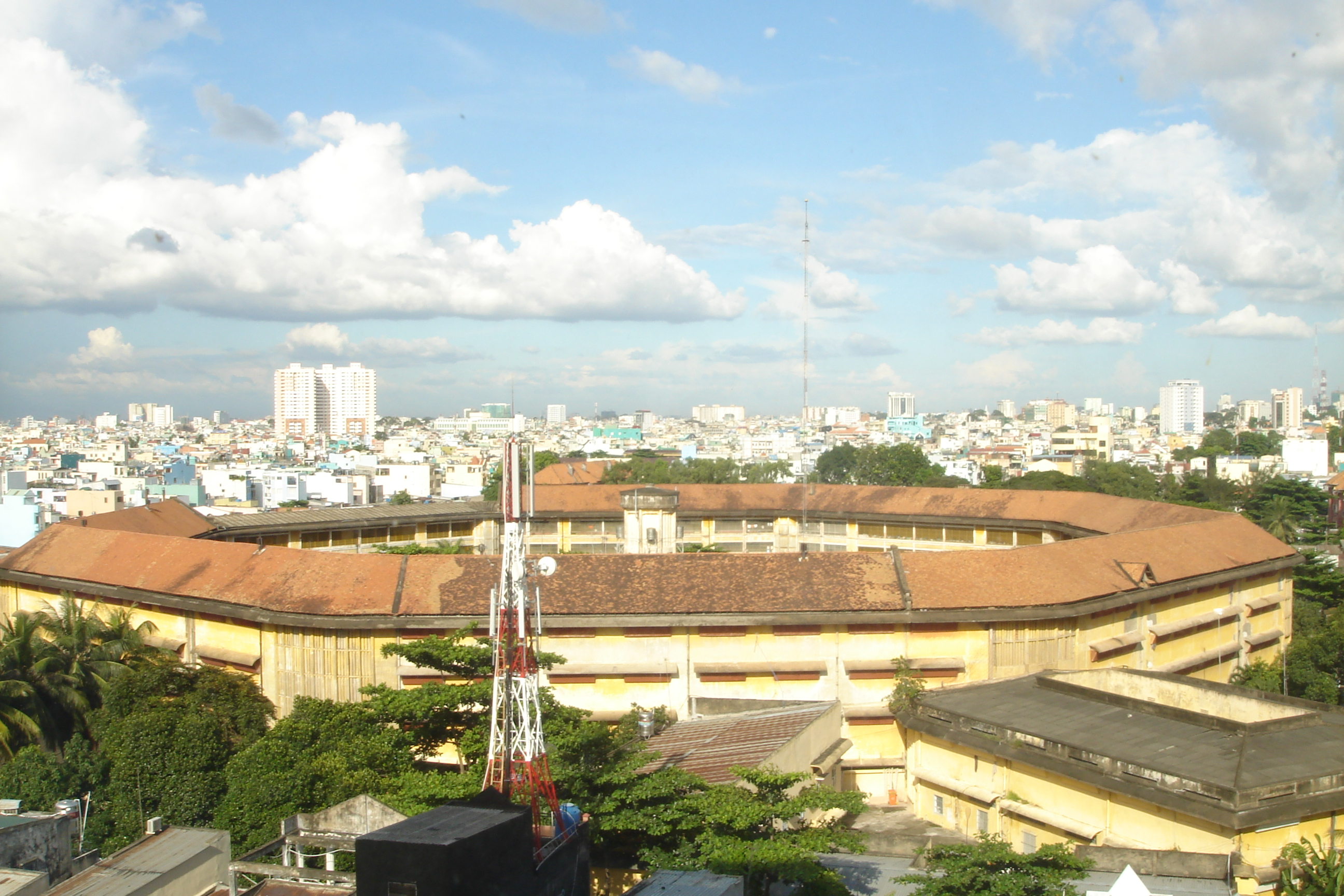
- Chí Hòa Prison where the convicted criminals were imprisoned
- Established: March 9, 1946
- Dissolved: March 1950
- Location: Saigon-Cholon, French Indochina
- Language: French

The French Permanent Military Tribunal in Saigon, also known as Saigon Trials, was a war crimes tribunal which held 39 separate trials against suspected Japanese war criminals between October 1946 and March 1950. Its scope was limited to war crimes committed against the French population of French Indochina after the Japanese coup d'état in French Indochina. Shifts in French foreign policy during the Cold War and disruptions caused by the First Indochina War caused the number of convictions to dwindle as judges opted to discontinue criminal charges against the defendants or commuted their sentences.

== Background ==
In June 1940, the Axis powers conquered France as part of the broader World War II, establishing a collaborationist Vichy regime in the country. The governor of French Indochina Admiral Jean Decoux declared his loyalty to the Vichy regime. In September 1940, the Empire of Japan invaded French Indochina occupying its northern part and completing its occupation in July 1941. Vichy officials continued their administration of the colony in the form of a Japanese puppet regime. On 9 March 1945, Japan overthrew the French colonial administration and violently disarmed its military and amid fears of a potential revolt.

On 15 August 1945, Japan declared its officially surrendered to the Allies. On 2 September 1945, Vietnamese nationalist resistance group Viet Minh declared North Vietnam to be independent, while British and Chinese troops moved in to occupy the colony. French attempts to reimpose its colonial administration in Indochina, faced opposition not only from Vietnamese nationalists but also from the United States of America and China. France therefore saw its participation in the persecution of Japanese war criminals as a way to legitimize its colonial ambitions in Southeast Asia and uphold its role as world power among the Allies.

The Provisional Government of the French Republic was faced with completely reforming its legal system in order to remove the footmarks of the Vichy regime. The French War Crimes Ordinance was created on 28 August 1944 by a team of jurists associated with the democratic branch of the French Resistance, with the ideas put forward by René Cassin and François de Menthon being featured prominently in the document. The ordinance delegated the persecution of war crimes to permanent military tribunals consisting of five military judges, most of whom were to be selected among former members of the French Forces of the Interior or the Resistance. All proceeding were public and the accused had the right to choose their own legal counsel. The ordinance's sixth article extended its application to French colonies.

== Investigations ==
On 13 January 1942, French National Committee signed the Declaration of St James's Palace which established the United Nations War Crimes Commission (UNWCC). UNWCC was to investigate Axis war crimes committed during the course of the war. In May 1944, an UNWCC sub-commission was established in Chungking in order to pursue those responsible for Japanese war crimes in the Pacific War. Vichy collaboration with the Japanese in Indochina, restricted the ability of the French government-in-exile to affect the course of the investigations. In February 1945, the Chungking sub-commission requested its member countries to compile a list of suspected war criminals following Australia's example. The presence of Japanese prisoners of war camps in Indochina made it an area of concern for all member countries. After France reestablished control over Indochina in early 1946, it handed its list of war crime suspects to the USA.

Between January and May 1946, Chinese troops in northern Indochina had repatriated 400 suspected war criminals to Japan and transported 160 more to Guangzhou for a separate war crimes trial, without informing their French counterparts. American officers likewise conducted investigation in Indochina independently from the French until 1947 when the onset of the Cold War led to a warming of Franco-American relations. In early 1947, American military authorities in Japan helped French representative Captain Gabrillagues to extradite 52 Japanese suspected war criminals to Saigon. British authorities on the other hand actively assisted in war crimes investigations in south Indochina. By January 1946, they had arrested 650 suspects and sent their case files to the Allied Land Forces South East Asia’s War Crimes Registry in Singapore. British and French investigators continued to collaborate closely to ensure that suspected war criminals were brought to trial.

French investigators believed that thousands of Japanese soldiers had defected to the Viet Minh. In an effort to curb the Viet Minh insurgency, French authorities offered to pardon Japanese war criminals willing to surrender. Only a few Japanese war criminals avoided persecution through this method. Delays in the disarmament of the Japanese army and the ongoing Viet Minh insurgency meant that certain areas remained inaccessible to the investigators further complicating the process. By June 1946, France had identified over 933 suspected Japanese war criminals. The General Directorate for Studies and Research had collated evidence from interrogations and intelligence reports, later sending the case files to the UNWCC.

== Overview ==
On 9 March 1946, the French Permanent Military Tribunal in Saigon (FPMTS) also known as the Saigon Trials was set up to investigate conventional war crimes ("Class B") and crimes against humanity ("Class C") committed by the Japanese forces after the 9 March 1945 coup d'état. The FPMTS was also tasked with prosecuting Vietnamese independence activists, as well as Chinese and French wartime collaborators. Japanese crimes against peace committed during the occupation of Indochina from 1940 to 1945 and (categorized as "Class A" crimes) were to be investigated at the Tokyo War Crimes Tribunal. The FPMTS examined war crimes committed between 9 March 1945 and 15 August 1945. The FPMTS tried a total of 230 Japanese defendants in 39 separate trials, taking place between October 1946 and March 1950. The war crimes examined were committed exclusively against the French population, most of the victims were members of resistance networks. Unlike other war crime tribunals in South East Asia, no persecutions were made for war crimes against the indigenous population. FPMTS served as an instrument of French foreign policy, aiming to highlight France as a victim of Japanese aggression while simultaneously showcasing the ability of the colonial authorities to govern the region.

All trials took place at the Saigon Military Court. The accused had the right to choose their own attorneys, those who refused to do so received the assistance of a French defense counsel. The Allies collaborated with a select group of trusted Japanese lawyers, some of whom participated in the Saigon trials. The lawyers typically highlighted various mitigating circumstances such as the defendants pre-war background, family status and treatment of French citizens. The court reached all decisions by majority vote in an open court. The accused had the right to appeal within a day from their conviction.

== Trials ==
=== Lang Son Massacre ===
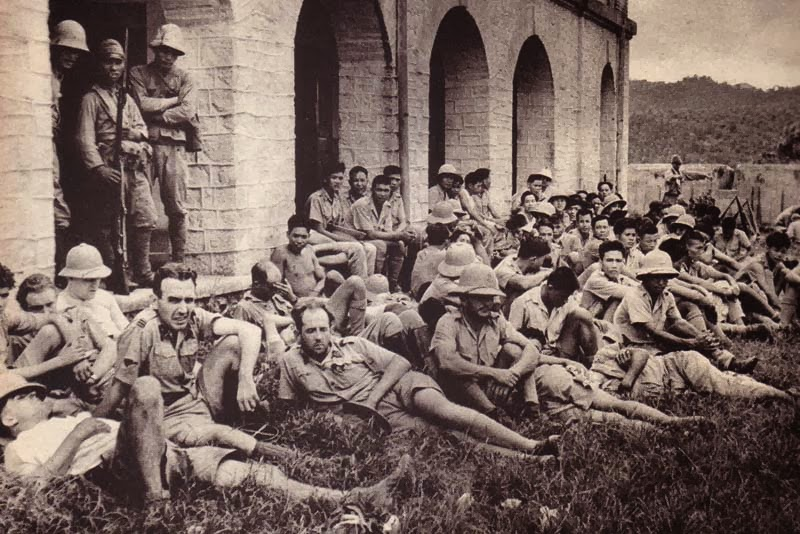
French prisoners of war in Lạng Sơn

On 9 March 1945, the Japanese invited French military officials to a banquet at Lạng Sơn only to immediately arrest them. In the meantime, the Japanese army attacked French positions across the colony. Following three days of fighting, 600 French soldiers were taken prisoner. A total of 300 French prisoners were executed in what came to be known as the Lang Son Massacre. The defendants included commanding officer colonel Shizume, and his three captains including Yoshio Fukuda and Kayakawa. Shizume was accused of taking prisoners into a small courtyard in groups of 20 where they were shot and bayoneted. Kayakawa was accused of ordering the murder of general Émile Lemonnier after the latter refused to surrender. All of the defendants were sentenced to death and executed.

=== Kenpeitai ===
On 14 February 1947, the judges examined case number 19, which involved 49 members of the Saigon Kempeitai who were tried jointly. They were charged with sequestration with torture. They were accused of torturing 60 arrestees by depriving them of food and water, holding them in overcrowded and unsanitary conditions, beating them with batons and forcing them to drink boiling tea. Nine of the defendants were sentenced to death, four were sentenced to death in absentia, 27 received various sentences from 7 years in prison to life imprisonment and nine were acquitted. The Phnom Penh Kempeitai (27 defendants) and Hanoi Kempeitai (37 defendants) were tried on 19 November 1946 and 5 April 1948 respectively.

== Aftermath ==
According to Chizuru Namba, 112 of the defendants received prison sentences, 63 were executed, 23 received life imprisonment and 31 were acquitted. Further 228 people were condemned in absentia. Those condemned were incarcerated in the Poulo Condore Island prison and the Chí Hòa Prison, with the last executions taking place in May 1951. In May 1950, they were transferred to the Sugamo Prison in Tokyo where they came under the jurisdiction of the US Occupational Authorities. After Japan achieved sovereignty on 28 April 1952, their sentences could only be modified with French authorization. After 1949, the trials lost their political importance as France sought to improve its relations with Japan and struggled to contain the Viet Minh rebellion after the communists emerged victorious in the Chinese Civil War. The judges opted to voluntarily discontinue criminal charges before the beginning of the trial or commuted past sentences. This led to the lowest number of convicted Japanese war criminals out of all the major Allied nations.

== Sources ==
- Dommen, Arthur J (2002). The Indochinese Experience of the French and the Americans: Nationalism and Communism in Cambodia, Laos, and Vietnam. Indiana University Press. ISBN 9780253109255.
- Gunn, Geoffrey (2015). "The French Permanent Military Tribunal in Saigon (1945–50)". End of Empire.
- Hammer, Ellen (1966). The Struggle for Indochina 1940-1955: Vietnam and the French Experience. Stanford University Press. ASIN B0006DFB6Y.
- Schoepfel, Ann-Sophie (2014). "The War Court as a Form of State Building: The French Prosecution of Japanese War Crimes at the Saigon and Tokyo Trials". In Cheah, Wui Ling; Yi, Ping (eds.). Historical Origins of International Criminal Law: Volume 2. Torkel Opsahl Academic. pp. 119–141. ISBN 978-82-93081-13-5.
- Schoepfel, Ann-Sophie (2016). "Justice and Decolonization: War Crimes on Trial in Saigon, 1946–1950". In von Lingen, Kerstin (ed.). War Crimes Trials in the Wake of Decolonization and Cold War in Asia, 1945-1956. Palgrave Macmillan. pp. 167–194. ISBN 978-3-319-42987-8.
- Trefalt, Beatrice (2016). "The French Prosecution at the IMTFE: Robert Oneto, Indochina and the Rehabilitation of French Prestige". In von Lingen, Kerstin (ed.). War Crimes Trials in the Wake of Decolonization and Cold War in Asia, 1945-1956. Palgrave Macmillan. pp. 51–68. ISBN 978-3-319-42987-8.
