= Vietnamization (cultural assimilation) =

Acquisition or imposition of elements of Vietnamese culture

Vietnamization or Vietnamisation (Vietnamese: Việt hóa; chữ Hán: 越化 or Vietnamese: Việt Nam hóa; chữ Hán: 越南化) is the acquisition or imposition of elements of Vietnamese culture, in particular the Vietnamese language and customs. This was experienced in some historic periods by the non-Vietnamese populations of territories controlled or substantially under the influence of Vietnam. As with other examples of cultural assimilation, it is partly voluntary and partly forced and most visible in territories where the Vietnamese language or culture had been dominant or their adoption would result in increased prestige or social status, as was the case of nobility in Champa and other minorities like Tai, Chinese, and Khmers. Vietnamization was by and large practiced by various administrations.

== Summary ==
Vietnamization is one of major example over cultural assimilation.

Dated back to antiquity, various Vietnamese governments had initiated attempts of assimilate Vietnamese culture. Such efforts are classified into two eras:

- Ancient and medieval Vietnam: judging the complicated nature of Vietnam and its country, especially Đại Việt, Vietnamese Emperors had conducted several assimilations; on one hand, this was done to the Tai and Hmong tribes within the country; on the other hand, ethnic assimilation was forced on the remaining ethnic groups, such as the Chinese, Chams, Montagnards, Malays and Khmers. The first one was seen as more successful, judging from the fact that the Tai and Hmong remain largely loyal to imperial dynasties, whereas the second one was less so, inciting resistance and violence, where brutalities and executions ensued.
- Modern Vietnam: post-war forced assimilation had been conducted to pacify various ethnic groups. After its independence from France and Japan, Vietnamese found themselves vulnerable to separate into smaller states, given in addition that more than 30% Vietnamese population then were not Vietnamese. Vietnamese nationalists, notably Việt Minh, therefore emphasized the need for long term homogeneity of the state in ethnic and cultural terms. This trend continued during the heat of Vietnam War, especially in South Vietnam. There had been similar campaign in North Vietnam, despite a difference in tactics. Having to speak the Vietnamese language proved to be the greater threat to the preservation of identity to the non-Vietnamese, eventually leading to their resistance. En-masse ethnic rebellions, notably in the South, where policies were believed to have alienated native population alike, ensued. After 1975, ethnic rebellions would remain yet a problem for the newly established communist government, but unlike their former counterparts, which had struggled to maintain unity in the south, the Communists incited Vietnamese nationalist fervors, employing Józef Piłsudski-based assimilation. Rebellious efforts were judged disloyal to the state. Such efforts subsided thereafter, though they still do happen, an example of which was the 2004 Degar rebellion in Central Highlands.

== Antiquity to medieval ==
Attempts to assimilate non-Vietnamese people began in the ancient era, after the Vietnamese suffered Chinese domination of Vietnam and Sinicization for decades. During Văn Lang, Âu Lạc, and Nanyue, assimilation had not existed.

Following the footsteps of Sinicization, Vietnamese dynasties began Vietnamization with smaller ethnic groups, namely the Tai, Muong, Chinese followed by other mountainous tribes like the Hmongs. These attempts were mostly successful, with the tribes' support and loyalty. This would remain the case for most of antiquity up to the medieval era, save scarce rebellions, such as that of Zhuang Tai led by Nùng Trí Cao, who had previously fought with the Vietnamese against the Song dynasty for fear that the Zhuang people would be Vietnamized. Nùng Trí Cao was not able to repel the Vietnamese, though he was able to secure the border of Yunnan, helping him establish a Tai state of Danan (Great South) and then Nanyue. Throughout history, Nùng's relations with the Vietnamese had been controversial, mixing cooperation and resistance to Vietnamization. The Nùng people in Vietnam today was named after him as a revered hero, with the acknowledgement of Nùng's role on Vietnamese history by the Vietnamese government .

Vietnamization had since then faced little resistance, with the sole exception of the Fourth Chinese domination of Vietnam. However, repulsion of Chinese soon led to even more aggressive Vietnamization, as Vietnam attacked a number of China's allies like Lan Xang, Lan Na, Cambodia and Champa, and penetrated the south, attacking the Malays on the sea. Captured prisoners and later ethnic people, notably the Hmongs of Central Vietnam, whom unlike the Hmongs of the north, had little to no connection, set up new chapter. Vietnamization of Chams and Khmers was the most known, and the most brutal one. Many Chams had refused the Vietnamese authority within them, and as for the result of the growing Trịnh–Nguyễn War and later Vietnamese Shogunate era, the Nguyễn lords decided to impose restriction of movement on Chams and Khmers, importing Chinese refugees fleeing from Qing conquest of Ming (in which many Chinese immigrants were later Vietnamized, and more successful than with Chams and Khmers). The Vietnamization of Chams went as for the result of resistance by the Chams, with continued from 15th century until the end of Vietnam War, was a sole evidence of the resilient of Vietnamization process; although not judge out anti-Vietnamese unrests by Chams alike.

Vietnamization was also extended to Central Highlands, creating unease among the Montagnards, who had remained neutral for many years save few incursions. While the former Khmer Empire and Champa were not able to conquer and vassalized them instead, the Vietnamese were more successful, in placing them under Vietnamese control after taking over the Highlands. Nonetheless, during the initial period of the Nguyễn dynasty, the Vietnamese Imperial Government had not been assimilating its people, having to gather loyalty from them to produce a buffer zone. These efforts did pay off: the Montagnards helped the Vietnamese army suppress Cham rebellion in the 1830s. Such Vietnam-Montagnard relations remained until French conquest.

== French Indochina from 1858–1954 ==
With the French Empire/French Republic taking over Vietnam at 1884, the Parisian government soon figured out a unification policy of French Indochina (comprising Laos, Vietnam and Cambodia) by ethnic assimilation, due to the ethnic heterogeneity of the region. Accordingly, the French soon tolerated a certain degree of Vietnamization process, empowering Vietnamese officials in the colony. The French bought loyalty from the non-Vietnamese these officials represent to de-Vietnamize others, inviting them to or sometimes make them establish their own community that would favor France in the case of Vietnamese rebellions, a strategy commonly known as "divide and rule".

For example, there was an apparent emigration of Chinese into Vietnam following the French colonisation of Vietnam from 1860, after the Convention of Peking was signed, whereby the Chinese, British and French authorities then started to recognize their rights to seek employment overseas. As the French deemed these Chinese immigrants, who were employed mainly as middlemen and physical labor could stimulate trade and industry, they did not Vietnamize them, but rather established a special Immigration Bureau in 1874. Chinese immigrants were required to register their clans and dialect group associations. Trade restrictions previously in place were lifted. Historians such as Khanh Tran viewed this as yet another divide-and-rule strategy for Vietnamization, with the aim of abating internal revolt. The Chinese witnessed an exponential increase in the late 19th century and even more so in the 20th century. In the 1870s and 1890s, some 20,000 Chinese settled in Cochinchina, while another 600,000 entered the region during the 1920s and 1930s. A peak occurred during the 1920s and late 1940s, during the Chinese Civil War, which led to pronounced instability and political stir. Both were sponsored and financed by the French authorities in an attempt to de-Vietnamize minorities in French Indochina. Enhancing self-identity of non-Vietnamese, the divide-and-rule strategy was rather successful in dividing the ethnic groups.

At the same time, by the assimilation and pacification policy, France brought Christianity to the Degar community, who were educated with the French system, which made them a new group of elites in the country. Meanwhile, the Montagnards founded their own community, which is still relevant today. Financial assistance from France also came to other non-Vietnamese people, though they varied across time.

The French government maintained this ethnic policy until the outbreak of First Indochina War, with the rise of Việt Minh an anti-colonial group that ran their own armed forces. Việt Minh, who supported the idea of a unified state, directly embraced Vietnamization and polemicized minorities who were named disloyal to the nation. Their targeted included even non-Buddhists, many of which were thought to have sided with France against the Vietnamese, notably Hmongs, Chams, Khmers and Degars. After the French was expelled from the country, Vietnamization was practiced by both the communist and capitalist governments, who continued with forcing name changes, religious conversions and the creation of Vietnamese self-identity.

== Vietnam War and after 1975 ==
Both North Vietnam and South Vietnam practiced similar Vietnamization policies, targeting minorities in a bid to construct stronger Vietnamese identities.

Most noteworthy of all such efforts was made by the South against the Degar population. Although the South Vietnamese and the Degars were both allies of the United States and opposed the growing threat from the communist North, the South Vietnamese, composed mainly of ethnic Vietnamese and Vietnamized minorities like Khmers, distrusted its Degar allies and had hardly promote Degar identity. Rather, the South Vietnamese government promoted Vietnamese nationalism, in a bid to completely Vietnamize the Degars, a policy which after 1975 the communist North would continue to practise. The Americans, however, were seen as an unwanted opposition against Degar Vietnamization, as they formed bonds with the Montagnards who fought all Vietnamese, North or South alike., as South Vietnamese government's Vietnamization was accused as ethnic genocide, which both South and the later communist government vehemently denied. The Montagnards had based such claims on the fact that the policy was enacted directly by the South Government, and that the ethnic Vietnamese majority had acquiesced.

The Communist North, on the other hand, used Vietnamization of indigenous Tai, Lao and Hmong to fight against South Vietnam, especially the Degars. The Degars, thus, had to face attacks from both the South and North armies. The Americans were unable to prevent this, despite being ally of both Degars and South Vietnam as Vietnamization had been practiced by both North and South Vietnam alike. Montagnards rebelled against the South Vietnamese in 1974.

Beside the Degars, the Chams and Khmers were the main ethnic groups to suffer forced Vietnamization, although the history of the process dated back even longer. For example, the Chams had been Vietnamized since the 15th century, and had openly called for attention to the even fiercer efforts than those towards the Degars. They founded the FULRO with the hope to fight against the much larger and more armed Vietnamese, culminating in the FULRO insurgency against Vietnam. Like the Degars, the Chams and Khmers also fought against both governments. Forming ties with the communist government notwithstanding, their resistance against Vietnamization remained.

The end of Vietnam War forced ethnic minorities, mostly in the south, to either be Vietnamized by force, or to give up their ethnic identities. FULRO became the united force of the Khmers, Chams, Degars and Hmongs (mostly Hmong Christians) against the Vietnamese. After the Vietnamese invasion of Cambodia, Cambodians, which constituted the majority of the Khmers, joined the resistance to Vietnamization. Either resistance efforts eventually ended in complete failure in the 1990s, when Vietnam enacted Đổi mới reforms and with the normalization of Vietnam-China relations and formation of bonds with the West, which had previously supported de-Vietnamization. The normalization of relations had also allowed Vietnam to further intensify its ongoing Vietnamization.

Despite the collapse of FULRO and weakening of the insurgency, Vietnamization had been the cause of 2001 and 2004 Degar rebellions in Central Highlands, wherein accusations of Vietnamization were made. Since then, ongoing Vietnamization forced Degar refugees to flee Vietnam en masse. Cham and Khmer refugees also attempted to flee Vietnam, albeit a weaker Vietnamization policy towards them.
