= Pierre Nguyễn Huy Mai =

Vietnamese Roman Catholic bishop

- Bishop of Ban Mê Thuột
- Church: Catholic Church
- Diocese: Diocese of Ban Mê Thuột
- In office: 22 June 1967 – 4 August 1990
- Predecessor: Diocese erected
- Successor: Joseph Trịnh Chính Trực

Orders
- Ordination: 29 June 1941 by Emmanuel Célestin Suhard
- Consecration: 15 August 1957 by Angelo Palmas

Personal details
- Born: 3 July 1913 Khuyến Lương Village (in present-day Lĩnh Nam Ward), Tonkin, Indochinese Union, French Empire
- Died: 4 August 1990 (aged 77) Buôn Ma Thuột, Đắk Lắk province, Vietnam

Pierre Nguyễn Huy Mai (July 3, 1913 − August 4, 1990) was a Vietnamese Roman Catholic bishop.

Ordained to the priesthood in 1941, Nguyễn Huy Mai was named bishop of the Roman Catholic Diocese of Ban Mê Thuột, Vietnam and ordained to the episcopate on August 15, 1967. He died in 1990 while still in office.
