= Buôn Ma Thuột (city) =

Buôn Ma Thuột Ban Mê Thuột
- Provincial city (Class-1)
- Buôn Ma Thuột City; Thành phố Buôn Ma Thuột
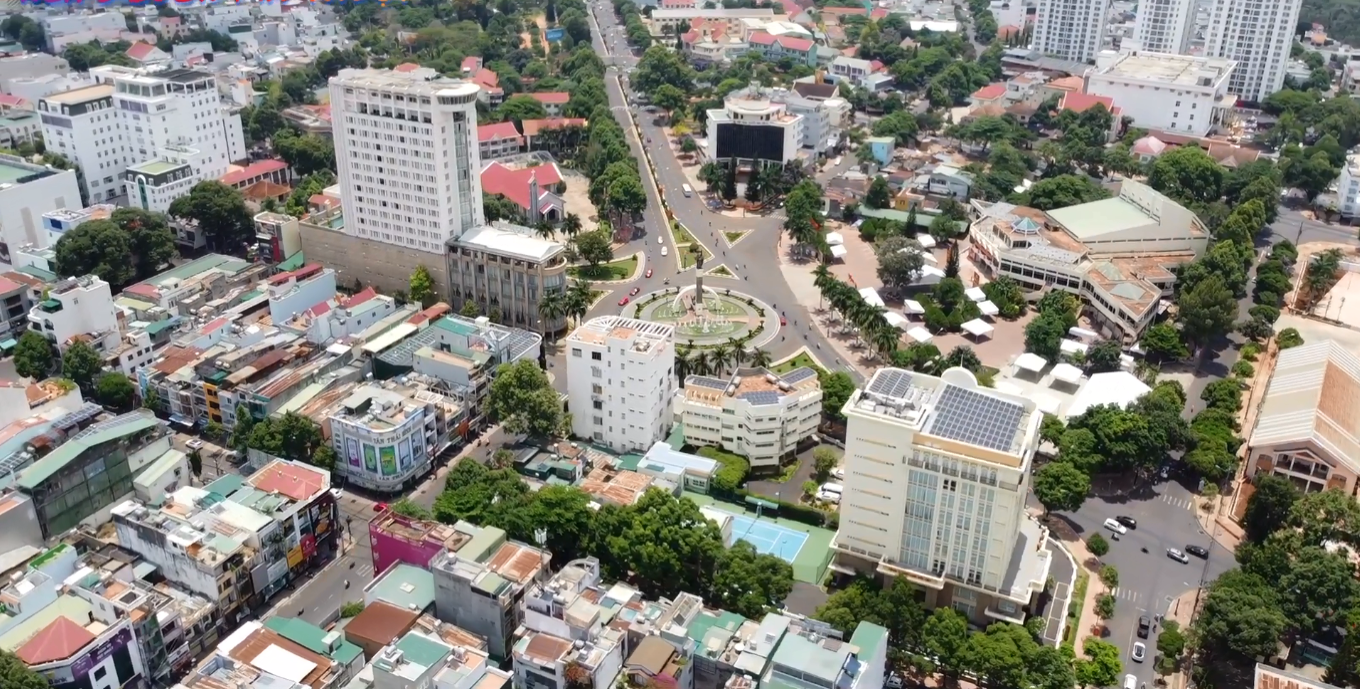
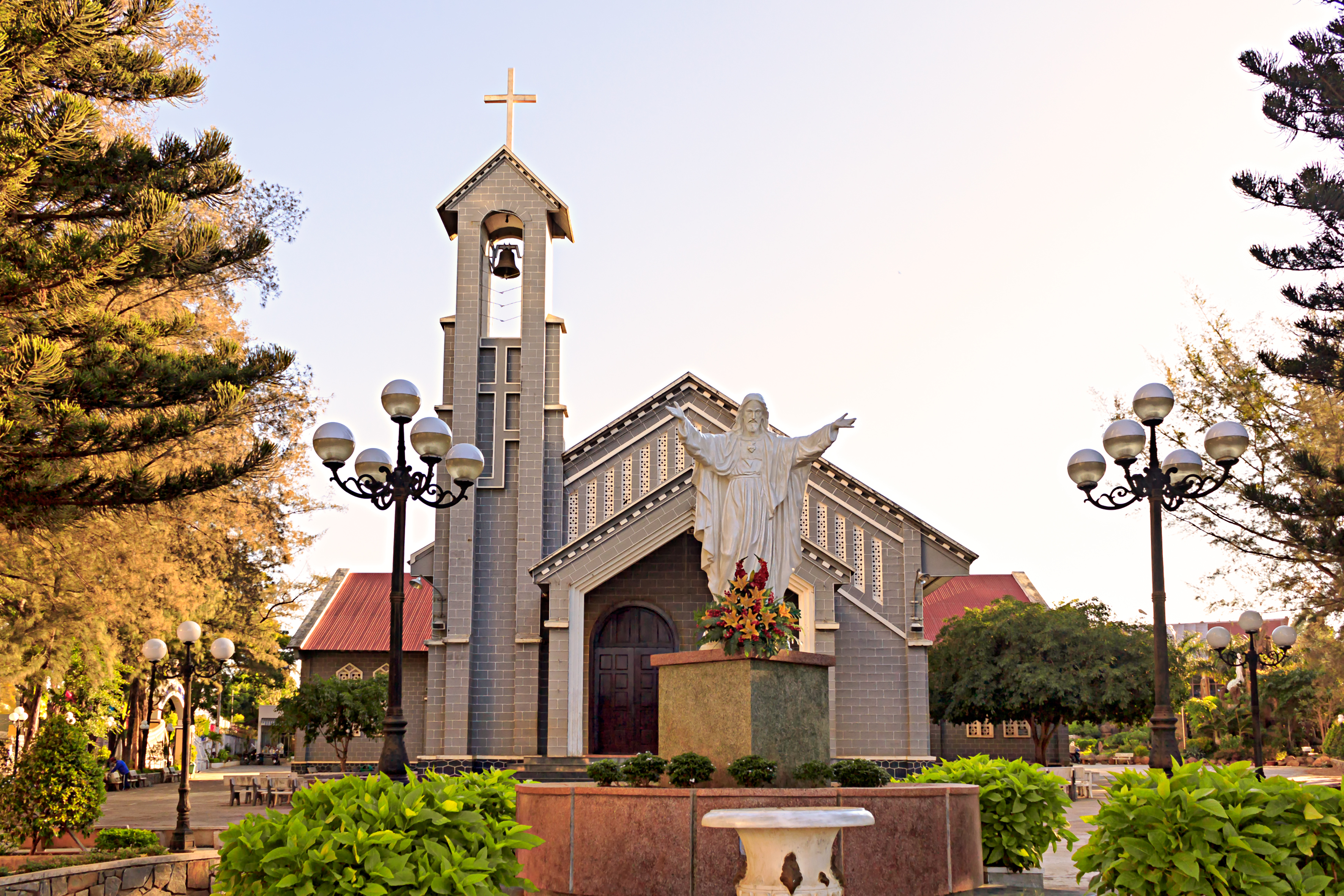
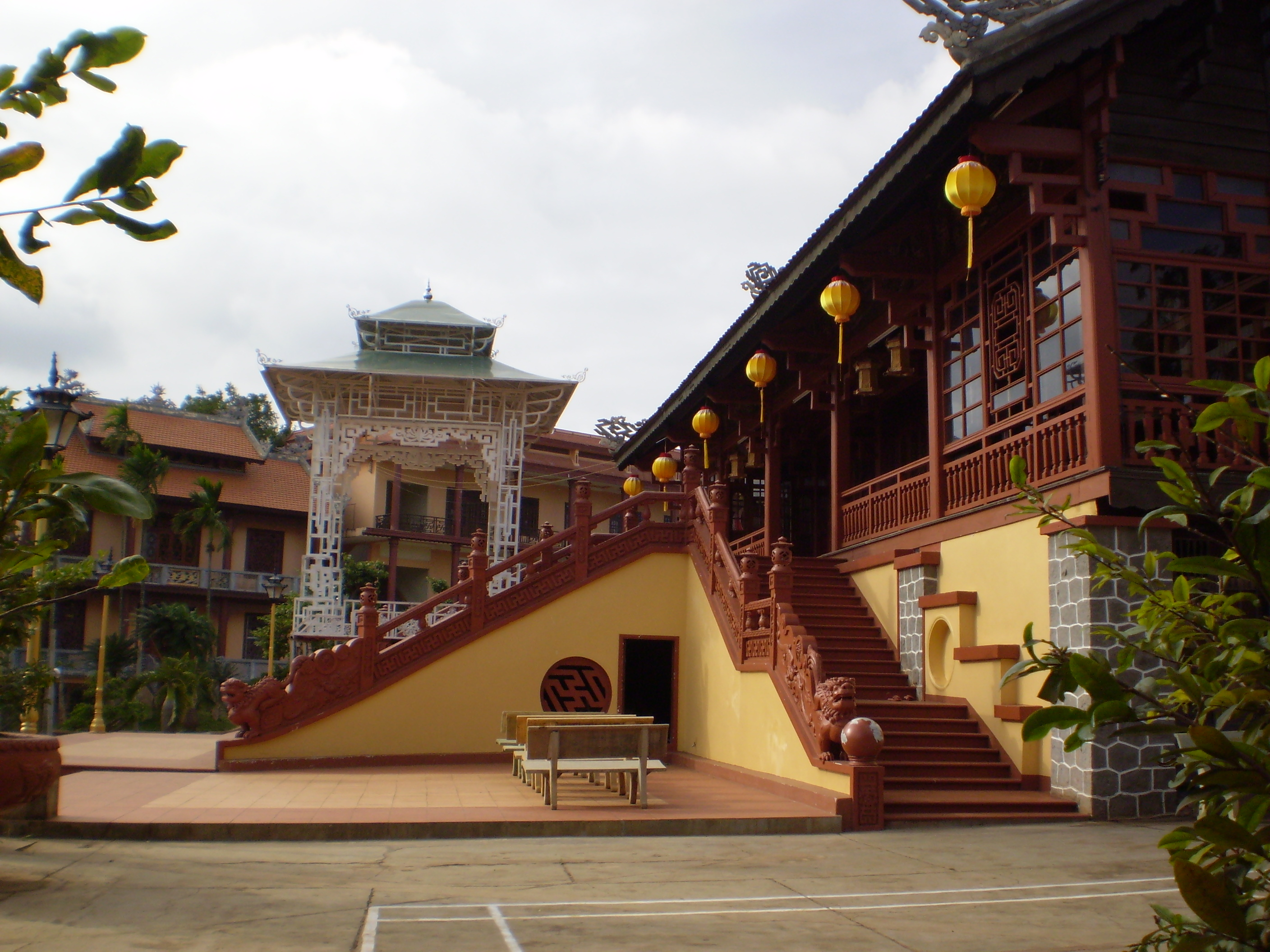
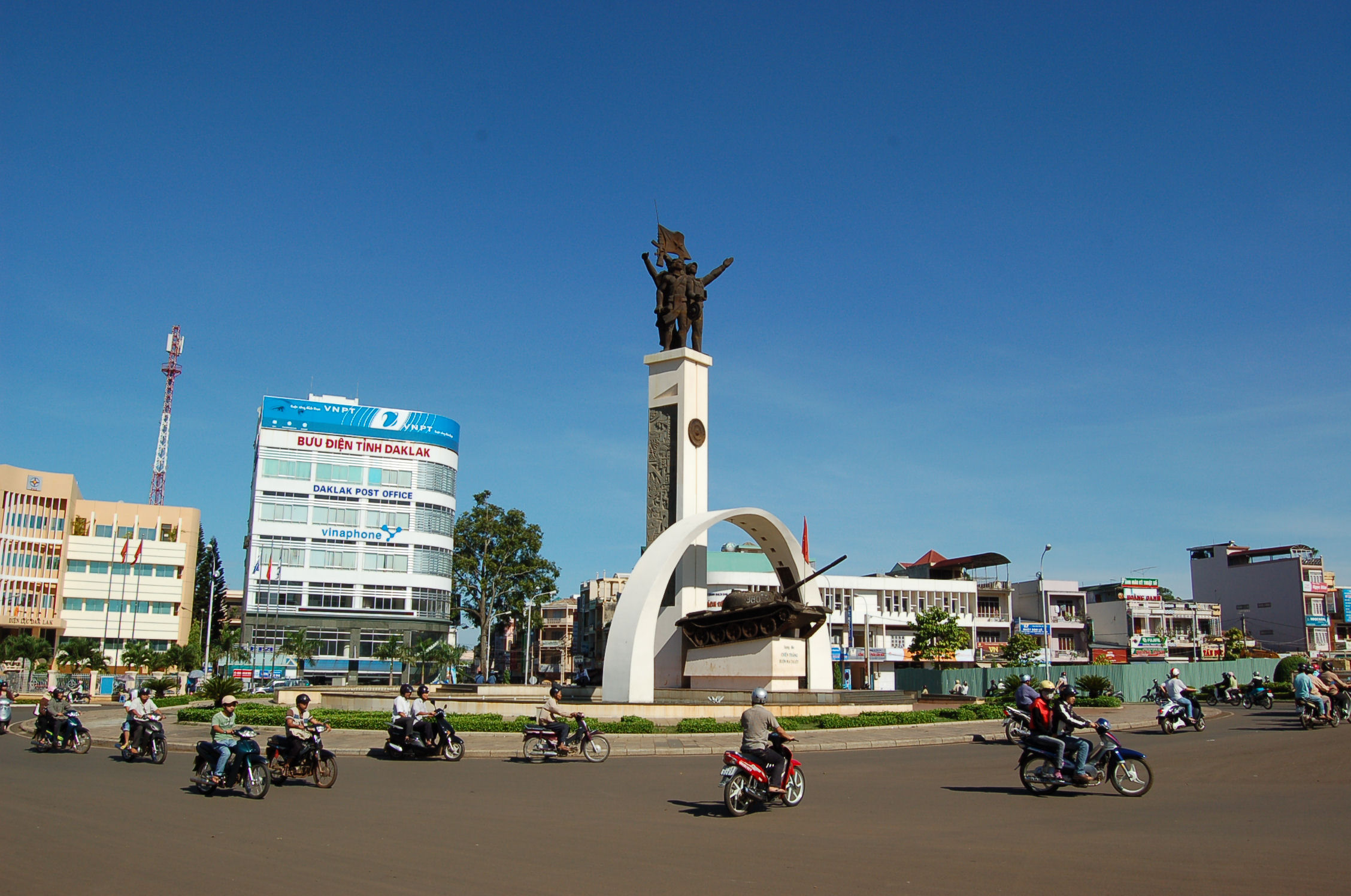
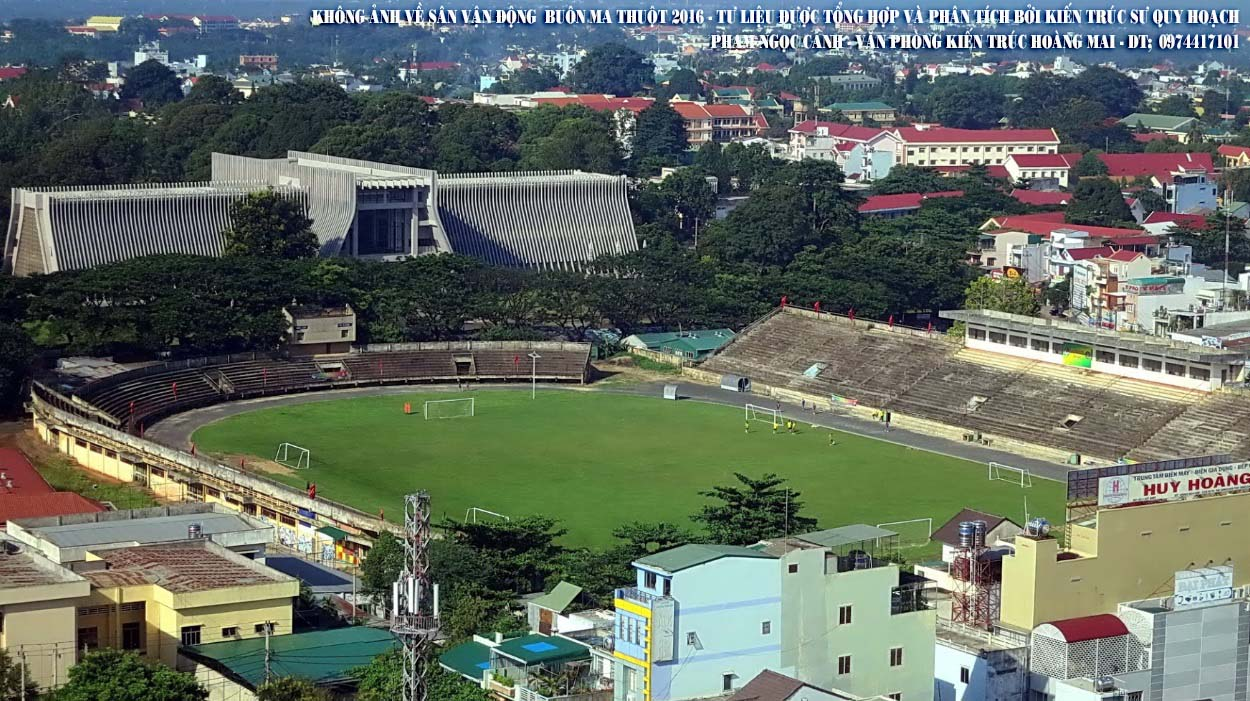
- From top to bottom, left to right: City center. Buôn Ma Thuột city square seen from above, Buôn Ma Thuột cathedral, Khải Đoan pagoda, Buôn Ma Thuột central intersection Buôn Mê Thuột stadium

- Seal
- Interactive map of Buôn Ma Thuột
- Location of in Vietnam Buôn Ma Thuột (Southeast Asia) Buôn Ma Thuột (Asia)
- Coordinates: 12°40′N 108°3′E
- Country: Vietnam
- Province: Đắk Lắk

Area
  - Provincial city (Class-1): 377.18 km^{2} (145.63 sq mi)
- Elevation: 536 m (1,759 ft)

Population (2023 estimate)
  - Provincial city (Class-1): 434.256
  - Density: 1.151/km^{2} (2.98/sq mi)
  - Urban: 246.671
- Time zone: UTC+7 (ICT)
- Website: buonmathuot.gov.vn (in Vietnamese)

Buôn Ma Thuột or sometimes Buôn Mê Thuột or Ban Mê Thuột (Vietnamese pronunciation: [ʔɓuon1 maː1 tʰuot̚ʔ6],), was the former capital city of Đắk Lắk Province in the Central Highlands of Vietnam. Its population was 434,256 in 2023. The city is the largest in the Central Highlands and is known for its coffee culture.

In 1904, the French colonialists established Dak Lak province and chose Buon Ma Thuot as its capital. Since then, Buon Ma Thuot has become the administrative, economic, and cultural center of the region. Throughout the First and Second Indochina Wars, Buon Ma Thuot was the scene of major confrontations between the Communists and anti Communists.

== Names ==
The name Buôn Ma Thuột derives from the language of the Ê Đê as the village of Ama Y Thuột, who held considerable power and prestige as the head of his village, where Buôn Ma Thuột now stands, in the late 19th century.

== History ==
In 1904, according to a decree by the Supreme Council of the Governor-General of Indochina, Đắk Lắk Province was established with its provincial capital in Buôn Ma Thuột. In 1913, Đắk Lắk Province was dissolved and merged into Kon Tum Province, causing Buôn Ma Thuột to lose its status as the provincial capital. However, in 1923, the Governor-General of Indochina issued a decree to re-establish Đắk Lắk Province, with Buôn Ma Thuột once again serving as the administrative center.

From the 1930s to 1954, Buôn Ma Thuột experienced significant development with the construction of numerous administrative, commercial, and military infrastructure projects by the French colonial government. The town gradually became a key hub connecting the Central Highlands with the central provinces of Vietnam.

After the Geneva Accords of 1954, Buôn Ma Thuột came under the control of the government of the Republic of Vietnam. From 1954 to 1975, it continued to serve as the administrative and economic center of Đắk Lắk Province. In 1958, the Saigon government divided the province into multiple districts, with Buôn Ma Thuột being the most important. The town also held a strategic position during the Vietnam War.

On March 10, 1975, the People's Liberation Army launched a decisive attack on Buôn Ma Thuột, marking the beginning of the Central Highlands Campaign. After 1975, Buôn Ma Thuột remained the central hub of Đắk Lắk Province. On August 21, 1995, Buôn Ma Thuột was officially upgraded to a city under the province's administration.

== Geography ==
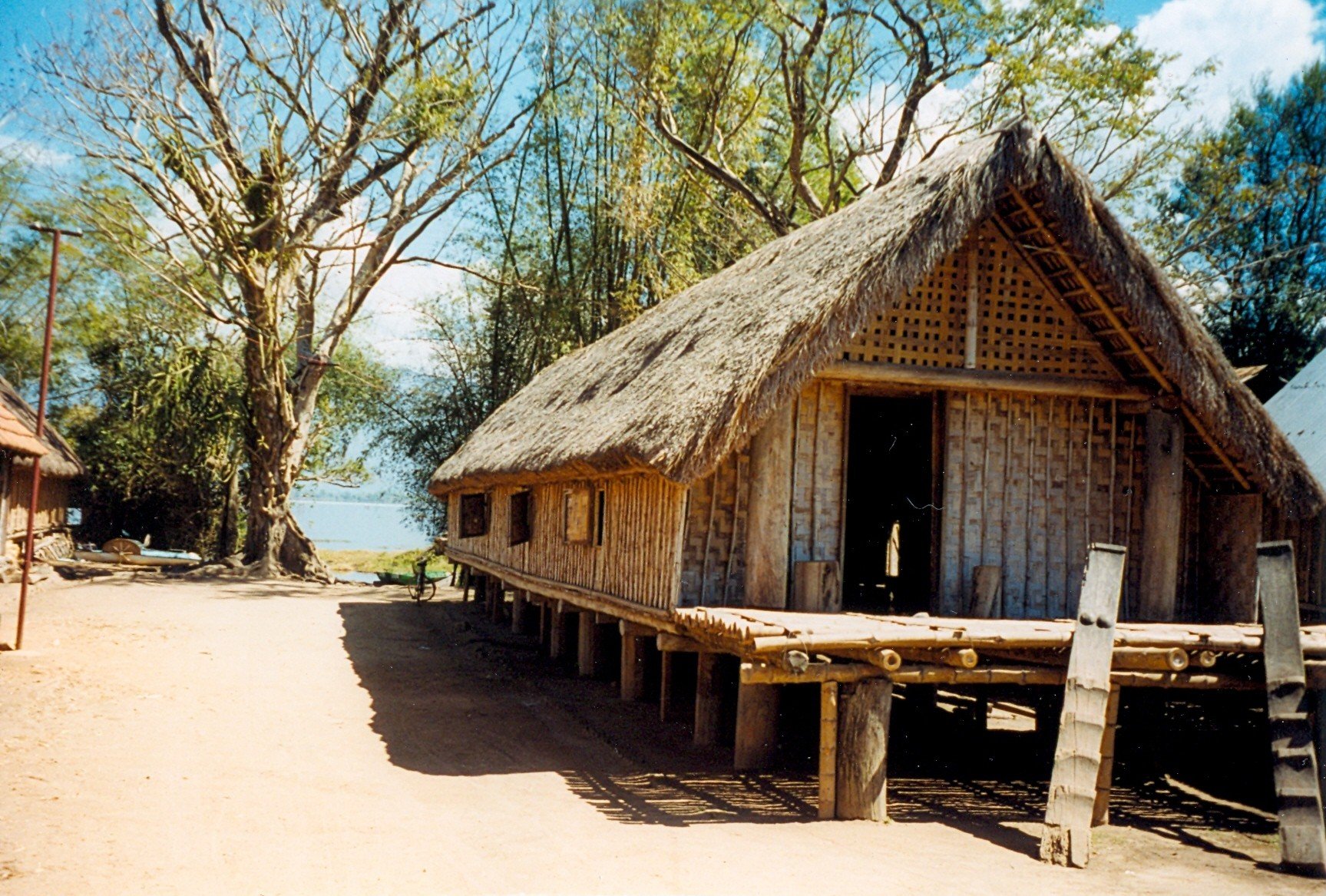
M'nong Longhouse in Buôn Ma Thuột

The city is located at 12.6667° N 108.0500° E, right at the heart of the Central Highlands of Vietnam, 1300 km from Hanoi, 500 km from Da Nang, and 350 km from Ho Chi Minh City. Lying on a fairly flat highland, at an average height of 536 m (1,759 ft) above sea level, Buôn Ma Thuột has a vital role in Vietnam's national security and defense system. Buôn Ma Thuột is the capital of Đắk Lắk Province and also the biggest city in the Central Highlands region (Tây Nguyên).

== Transportation ==
Buon Ma Thuot Airport is located southeast of the city which provides direct daily domestic flights to Ha Noi and Ho Chi Minh City operated by Vietnam Airlines, VietJet Air, Pacific Airlines and Bamboo Airways.

== Socioeconomic (2022) ==
Economic growth:

- The province's total gross domestic product (GRDP) grew by 8.94%, exceeding the planned target by 3.65%.
- Agricultural, forestry, and fishery production remained stable and played a key role in maintaining economic growth.
- The industrial production index increased by 16.75%, mainly due to controlled COVID-19 and the growth of the manufacturing sector.
- The mining sector experienced a decline due to difficulties in resource extraction policies and environmental protection regulations.

Business development:

- Approximately 1,500 new enterprises were established with a registered capital of over 20,100 billion VND, a 42.72% increase from 2021.

Trade and services:

- Retail sales and consumer service revenue reached over 100 trillion VND, a 19.9% increase from the previous year.
- Export turnover was estimated at 1.5 billion USD, a 30.32% increase, while import turnover was 450 million USD.

State budget:

- Total state budget revenue was estimated at over 9,152 billion VND, a 39.38% increase.
- State budget expenditures totaled over 21,236 billion VND, with development investment expenditures increasing by 14.99%.

Social indicators:

- The provincial population reached 1,918,440, an increase of 0.49%.
- The labor force from 15 years old and older increased to 1,146,335.
- Employment was provided to approximately 41,250 people, achieving 103.12% of the planned target.

Administrative reforms showed positive results, and political security and social order were maintained. During the press conference, questions about budget revenue and expenditures, new business registrations, and employment statistics were addressed by the leaders of the Đắk Lắk Statistics Department and other relevant departments.

== Government resolution ==
The Government issued Resolution No. 103/NQCP to implement the Political Bureau's Conclusion No. 67KL/TW, aiming to build and develop Buôn Ma Thuột, Đắk Lắk province, up to 2030 with a vision to 2045.

Key Goals for 20212025:

- Economic growth: Aim for an average annual growth rate above 11%.
- Economic structure by 2025: Services sector to constitute 62%, industryconstruction 30%.
- Income: Average per capita income to reach 150 million VND.
- Labor and training: Over 77% of the labor force to receive training; elimination of poverty; 80% of the population to have access to clean water; all communes to meet national health standards.

Main Objectives:

- Policy implementation: All government levels and departments to propagate and execute the resolution.
- Planning and development: Complete regional planning for Tây Nguyên and Đắk Lắk (2021-2030, vision 2050).
- Resource mobilization: Focus on attracting investments and improving infrastructure for efficient use of resources.
- Economic development: Leverage strengths in key economic areas, including developing human resources to meet Industry 4.0 demands.
- City development: Establish Buôn Ma Thuột as a hub for science, technology, tourism, and culture in Tây Nguyên.
- Social progress: Enhance the material and spiritual life of citizens.
- Environmental protection: Proactively address climate change and resource management issues.
- National defense and security: Ensure political stability and safety.
- Party building: Strengthen the party's integrity and effectiveness.

Cooperation and coordination:

- Government collaboration: Ministries and agencies to work closely with local authorities for effective implementation.
- Regional partnerships: Foster connections with neighboring provinces in the Cambodia/Laos/Vietnam Development Triangle and other key economic regions for sustainable development.

Longterm vision (2030-2045):

- Urban center development: Buôn Ma Thuột to become a central urban area in Tây Nguyên, maximizing natural resources and cultural values.
- Sustainable growth: Maintain high economic growth, shift economic structures, develop green and smart industries, and promote high-tech urban agriculture.
- Technological advancement: Embrace Industry 4.0 and innovation to improve human resource quality.

== Climate ==
Climate data for Buôn Ma Thuột
Month	Jan	Feb	Mar	Apr	May	Jun	Jul	Aug	Sep	Oct	Nov	Dec	Year
Record high °C (°F)	34.3 (93.7)	36.6 (97.9)	37.6 (99.7)	39.4 (102.9)	37.0 (98.6)	35.1 (95.2)	34.6 (94.3)	34.6 (94.3)	33.1 (91.6)	33.2 (91.8)	32.6 (90.7)	32.4 (90.3)	39.4 (102.9)
Mean daily maximum °C (°F)	27.1 (80.8)	29.6 (85.3)	32.0 (89.6)	33.3 (91.9)	31.8 (89.2)	29.9 (85.8)	29.2 (84.6)	29.0 (84.2)	28.9 (84.0)	28.4 (83.1)	27.2 (81.0)	26.2 (79.2)	29.4 (84.9)
Daily mean °C (°F)	21.0 (69.8)	22.5 (72.5)	24.5 (76.1)	26.1 (79.0)	25.8 (78.4)	24.9 (76.8)	24.3 (75.7)	24.2 (75.6)	24.0 (75.2)	23.5 (74.3)	22.5 (72.5)	21.2 (70.2)	23.7 (74.7)
Mean daily minimum °C (°F)	17.5 (63.5)	18.2 (64.8)	19.6 (67.3)	21.4 (70.5)	22.0 (71.6)	21.7 (71.1)	21.3 (70.3)	21.4 (70.5)	21.1 (70.0)	20.5 (68.9)	19.6 (67.3)	18.3 (64.9)	20.2 (68.4)
Record low °C (°F)	9.1 (48.4)	12.0 (53.6)	12.3 (54.1)	16.7 (62.1)	14.4 (57.9)	17.9 (64.2)	18.4 (65.1)	14.4 (57.9)	13.4 (56.1)	14.9 (58.8)	10.7 (51.3)	7.4 (45.3)	7.4 (45.3)
Average rainfall mm (inches)	5.2 (0.20)	3.8 (0.15)	24.1 (0.95)	84.3 (3.32)	233.6 (9.20)	245.1 (9.65)	253.7 (9.99)	309.8 (12.20)	311.4 (12.26)	198.8 (7.83)	100.3 (3.95)	26.4 (1.04)	1,784.3 (70.25)
Average rainy days	1.6	0.8	3.4	7.8	18.5	21.2	23.4	24.2	23.2	15.7	10.6	5.8	156.1
Average relative humidity (%)	77.6	74.2	72.0	72.8	80.2	84.8	86.1	87.4	88.4	86.5	84.5	82.1	81.4
Mean monthly sunshine hours	249.7	249.4	265.1	253.4	226.2	185.4	180.5	162.6	153.5	168.5	170.9	188.6	2,450.4
Source 1: Vietnam Institute for Building Science and Technology
Source 2: The Yearbook of Indochina (1932-1933)

== Culture and heritage ==
=== Coffee ===
Although coffee was introduced to Vietnam as early as 1870, in Đắk Lắk, it only began widespread cultivation in the 1930s by the French. The basalt soil in the Central Highlands proved particularly suitable for coffee cultivation, leading to an increase in coffee growing areas. Currently, according to statistics, Đắk Lắk has more than 175,000 hectares of coffee (in reality, over 200,000 hectares, as some areas are not included in the official plan). Đắk Lắk is recognized as having the highest coffee yield in the world, significantly contributing to Vietnam's position as the second largest coffee exporter globally, with robusta coffee ranking first. Almost every district in Đắk Lắk grows coffee, but Buôn Ma Thuột coffee is considered the highest quality with a distinctive flavor, earning the city the title "coffee capital."

Buôn Ma Thuột aspires to become a global centre for coffee. The city's unique cultural heritage, combined with its superior coffee production, plays a key role in its position in the international coffee industry, aiming to elevate its status and recognition on the world stage.

=== Khải Đoan Pagoda ===
Khải Đoan Pagoda, officially named "Sắc tứ Khải Đoan tự," is located in Thong Nhat Ward, Buon Ma Thuot City, Dak Lak Province. It is the largest Buddhist pagoda in the city and one of the largest in the Central Highlands of Vietnam. The pagoda holds historical significance as it was the last to receive a royal decree of recognition ("Sắc tứ") from a Vietnamese king.

The pagoda was initiated in 1951 by Queen Mother Hoang Thi Cuc, the principal wife of King Khai Dinh and mother of King Bao Dai. The pagoda was built on land donated by the queen mother, who also contributed most of the construction funds, alongside donations from Buddhist followers and the local community. In 1953, during the completion ceremony of the rear hall, it was officially named "Sắc tứ Khải Đoan" by King Bao Dai, combining the names of King Khai Dinh and Queen Mother Doan Huy.

Covering an area of about 4 hectares, Khải Đoan Pagoda features various structures harmoniously integrated with natural landscapes. The main hall, or "chính điện," is the most prominent building, with an area of 320 square meters. It combines the architectural styles of traditional Hue rường houses and the longhouses of the Ede people in the Central Highlands. The main hall houses five altars with bronze Buddha statues and intricately carved wooden bases. Additional structures within the pagoda include the rear hall, bell tower, drum tower, and a library ("tàng kinh các"). The rear hall, similar in structure to the main hall but simpler, contains statues of Quan Am and memorials to past abbots. The bell tower houses a large bronze bell donated by Prince Bao Long and Bao Thang.

Khải Đoan Pagoda serves as a major center for Buddhism in Dak Lak and the Central Highlands, often referred to as the "Great Pagoda" or "Provincial Pagoda." It has been the headquarters of the Buddhist Association of Dak Lak Province since 1986. The pagoda's unique history and architecture make it a significant cultural and religious site, attracting numerous Buddhist followers and visitors to Buon Ma Thuot City.

=== Coffee festival ===
The Buôn Ma Thuột Coffee Festival, held biennially in Buôn Ma Thuột city, Đắk Lắk province, honors coffee, a dominant crop contributing 60% of Vietnam's coffee output. The festival, first organized in 2005, features activities related to coffee production and processing, alongside vibrant cultural and sports events and online transactions with the global market.

=== Ngã 6 Ban Mê ===
Ngã 6 Ban Mê is the city's center, featuring the Buôn Ma Thuột Victory Monument, symbolizing the city. Initially a roundabout with a threelight pole after liberation, it now hosts a grand monument with a steel tank symbolizing the beginning of the Buôn Ma Thuột battle. In the late 20th century, the victory monument was significantly expanded.

=== Remaining Kơnia tree ===
A remaining Kơnia tree is preserved at the Đắk Lắk Cultural Center, a few hundred meters from Ngã 6. The Kơnia tree holds significant spiritual meaning for ethnic minorities, serving as a resting place for spirits and providing shade for workers. Inspired by the famous song "Under the Shadow of the Kơnia Tree," visitors often seek out the tree in Buôn Ma Thuột.

=== Buôn Akô Đhông ===
Buôn Akô Đhông, also known as Buôn Cô Thôn or Ma Rin, is an Ê Đê village in Buôn Ma Thuột. The village is located by a stream in Buôn Ma Thuột, once an important source of water for the natives. Situated at the end of Trần Nhật Duật street, the well-planned village preserves many traditional values and is a popular tourist destination.

=== Gong Culture ===
The Gong Culture of the Central Highlands of Vietnam was officially recognized by UNESCO on 25 November 2005 as a Masterpiece of the Oral and Intangible Heritage of Humanity. Following the recognition of the Court Music of Hue, it became the second intangible cultural heritage of Vietnam to receive this designation.

The cultural space of gong culture extends across five provinces in the Central Highlands, including Kon Tum, Gia Lai, Dak Lak, Dak Nong, and Lam Dong. It plays an important role in the spiritual and social life of local ethnic communities, where gongs are used in rituals, ceremonies, and daily activities to express a range of emotions and cultural meanings.

== Tourist attractions ==
Buôn Ma Thuột, the first settlement of Kinh people who migrated to establish Đắk Lắk, hosts most of the province's historical sites, including:

- World Coffee Museum
- Trung Nguyên Coffee Village
- Dray Nur and Dray Sap waterfall
- Gia Long waterfall
- Sắc tứ Khải Đoan Pagoda
- Bản Đôn
- Trohbu Botanic Garden
- Lạc Giao Temple
- Buôn Ma Thuột Prison
- Lạc Giao Monument
- Bảo Đại Villa, now the Vietnam Ethnic Groups Museum in Đắk Lắk
- Bishop's House in Đắk Lắk
- Ako Dhong Village
- Ea Kao Lake
- Yang Prong Tower

== See also ==
- Sacred Heart Cathedral, Buôn Ma Thuột
