= Joseph Trịnh Chính Trực =

Vietnamese Roman Catholic bishop

- Bishop of Ban Mê Thuột
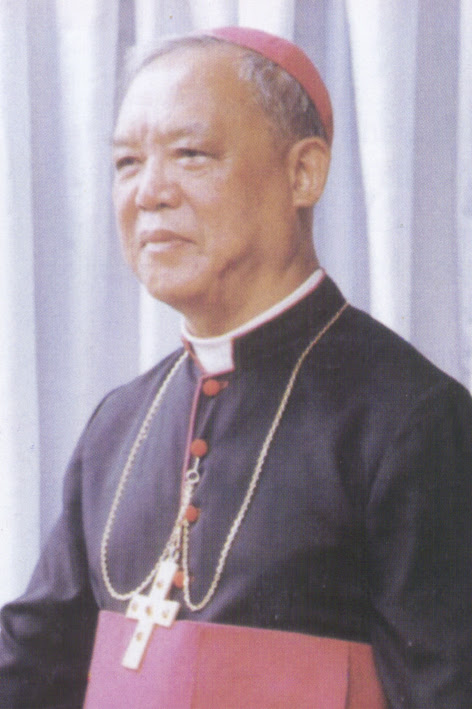
- Church: Catholic Church
- Diocese: Diocese of Ban Mê Thuột
- In office: 4 August 1990 – 29 December 2000
- Predecessor: Pierre Nguyễn Huy Mai
- Successor: Joseph Nguyễn Tích Đức
- Previous post: Coadjutor Bishop of Ban Mê Thuột (1981-1990)

Orders
- Ordination: 31 May 1954
- Consecration: 15 August 1981 by Pierre Nguyễn Huy Mai

Personal details
- Born: 25 October 1925 Bút Đông Parish (present-day Duy Tân Ward), Hà Nam province, Tonkin, Indochinese Union, French Empire
- Died: 23 September 2011 (aged 85) Buôn Ma Thuột, Đắk Lắk province, Vietnam

Joseph Trịnh Chính Trực (25 October 1925 – 23 September 2011) was the Catholic bishop of the Diocese of Ban Mê Thuôt, Vietnam. Ordained to the priesthood in 1954, Truc was named bishop in 1981, and retired in 2000.
