= Dang Le Nguyen Vu =

Vietnamese entrepreneur and businessman

Đặng Lê Nguyên Vũ
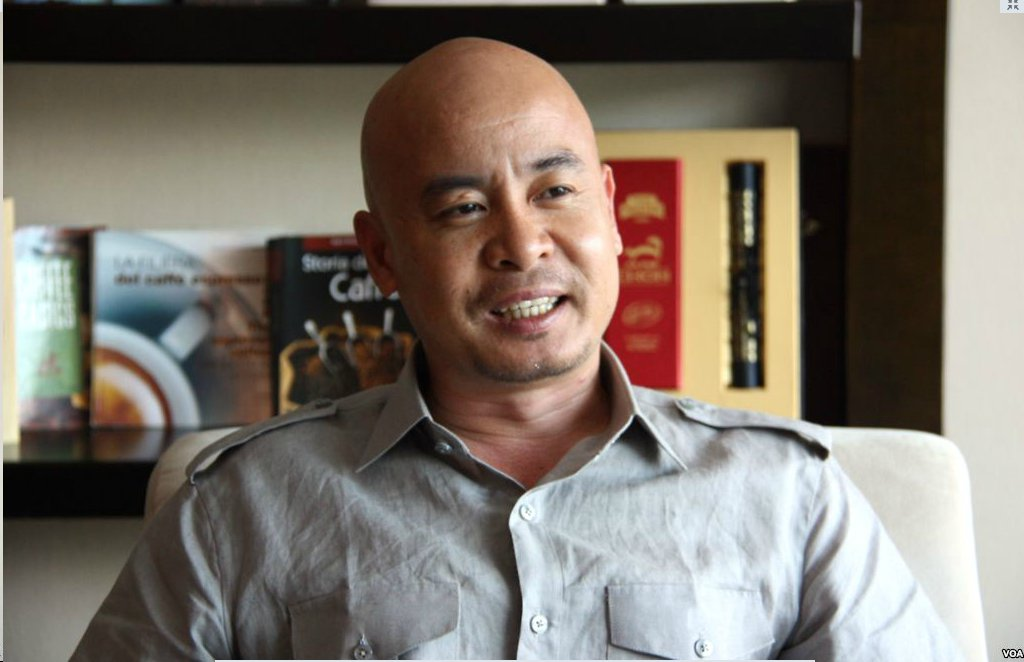
- Born: February 10, 1971 (age 55); Ninh Hòa, Khánh Hòa, South Vietnam
- Other names: Chairman Vu, Qua Vu
- Occupation: President of the Trung Nguyen coffee company
- Years active: 1997–present
- Spouse: Lê Hoàng Diệp Thảo (m. 1998; div. 2021)
- Children: 4

The surname is Đặng. The middle names are Lê and Nguyên. In Vietnamese customs, he should be referred to his given name; Vũ.

Đặng Lê Nguyên Vũ (born February 10, 1971), better known as Chairman Vũ, is a Vietnamese entrepreneur. He is the co-founder (along with former spouse Lê Hoàng Diệp Thảo), president and general director of Trung Nguyên Group. He has been described by National Geographic and Forbes as "Zero to Hero", "Vietnam's Coffee King" and "Philosopher-King". He is also an activist and philanthropist.

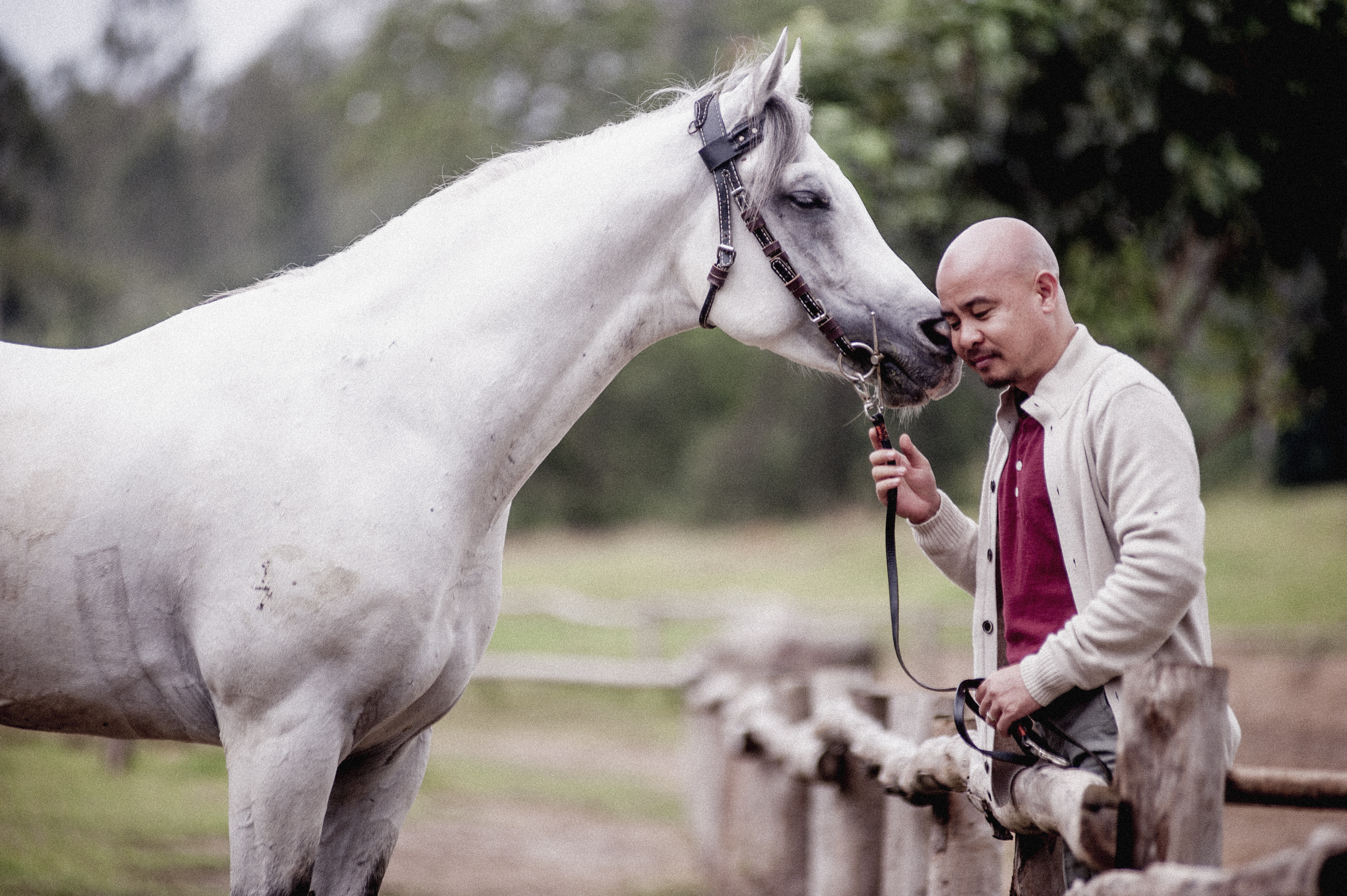
Chairman Vu beside his Akhal-Teke horse in 2012

== Early life and background ==
Vũ was born on 10 February 1971 in Ninh Hòa, Khánh Hoà, into a poor family. In 1979, his family moved to M'Đrăk District, central western Vietnam province of Đắk Lắk. In 1990, he went to Tây Nguyên University. During that time, he began to study and research coffee, eventually consulting with his future spouse Thảo, a post office information service worker with deep knowledge of the industry. In 1996, he and Thảo co-founded the Trung Nguyên Coffee Company in the city of Buôn Ma Thuột.

In 1998, Trung Nguyên opened its first cafe space in Phú Nhuận, Ho Chi Minh City, expanding its business operation under a franchising model that was "revolutionary at the time". Since that time, several coffee house franchises have launched nationwide. From 2003, due to the rapid development of its instant coffee brand G7, Trung Nguyên led Vietnam's coffee market for around a decade. In that year, Trung Nguyên's G7 coffee took the largest slice of the domestic market, with a "38 per cent share for 9 years", according to an AC Nielsen 2012 survey. G7 was pronounced the most preferred instant coffee product over Nestlé in a 2003 blind test, which is often cited as "an example of 'David' against 'Goliath'", in which participants voted in high numbers for the G7 product as recorded by the press and observers. Nielsen data showed the product had become the 'top trending brand in the local 3-in-1 coffee market segment in 2003–2012 in terms of market-share, revenue, and sales volume'.

In August 2012, Forbes called Vũ as "Vietnam's Coffee King". From that time onward he was frequently referred to as the 'King of Coffee' by the press. In October 2012, he was named 'Pioneer of the Year' in a public vote by VNExpress readers. In March 2013, he was granted the title of 'Forever worthy of the descendants of Lạc Hồng' in 'The Divine Root 2014' program held by the National Assembly's Committee for Culture and Education, the Club of Patriotic Businesses of Vietnam, and the Society of Historical Science of Vietnam.

Dang is widely known for his spiritual beliefs. He is the founder of his own transcendental "Doctrine of Coffee" whereby he has developed a spiritual philosophy and zen practice named 'Coffeeism' (Coffee Tao or Coffee Ceremony), including 'Coffee Zen'. It is described as an 'all-comprehensive, all-dimensional, all-global', 'holofractal' approach to healing, success, fortune, well-being and enlightenment; in which "Coffee is the 'Treasure of Earth and Heaven', Heritage of Humankind and Solution to the Future".

In late 2014, Dang and 18 fellow men went on a 49-day fasting and Zen journey.

He has been called "frank but pretty unfriendly" in some remarks concerning Starbucks coffee.

Beside his success in the coffee business, he also has a passion for cars. His car collection, the biggest in Vietnam, has now grown close to 100 cars, valued at more than 1 trillion VND (approx. 40.31 million US Dollars). He also owns the biggest collection of Ferraris in the country, with 10 cars. Notable cars in his collection include: Bugatti Veyron (only one in the country), McLaren Senna, Porsche 918 Spyder, Toyota GR Supra, Ford GT, Mercedes-Benz SLS AMG GT Final Edition, Aston Martin DBX707 among many other names.

== Divorce ==
Following Vũ's first 49-day meditation session in 2013, his marital relationship with Lê Hoàng Diệp Thảo unraveled and the pair separated, his wife concerned that Vu had been mentally damaged by the meditation experience. As both husband and wife were heavily involved in the Trung Nguyen business, their breakup had a strongly negative impact on the company, with the firm's export business suffering from neglect in particular. In 2014, Thảo was stripped of her management rights and barred access to the company despite still holding legal ownership rights to the firm.

The pair entered into lengthy divorce proceedings that became a notable scandal in the Vietnamese press. The divorce remained unsettled until a 2021 final court ruling granted Vu the rights to retain management of Trung Nguyên Group.

In 2015, Thảo moved to “preserve the Trung Nguyên brand” and continue her efforts to distribute Vietnamese coffee products globally through the establishment of TNI King Coffee, which effectively competes with Trung Nguyen. While King Coffee has expanded its distribution to more than 120 countries, Trung Nguyen's profit margins have declined under Vu's independent management.

== Honours and awards ==
On 27 April 2011, the brandname "Trung Nguyen Coffee" appeared in the Financial Times as a major case study on a successful enterprise model in which the company was voted as one of the most prevailing organizations.

In 2012, Dang was honored as 'Coffee King', officially, by National Geographic.

In August 2012, Forbes magazine portrayed him as 'Vietnam coffee king', and described him as a figure of "Zero to Hero". Since then, local and world press and society has mentioned him as the Coffee King.

In October 2012, he was selected as a 'Pioneer of the Year' in a public vote by VnExpress readers. The vote's introduction reads "Chairman Vũ who has been titled as 'Vietnamese Coffee King' has 'belled the cat' in developing franchising model in Vietnam".

- The Prize of “The Gold Star of the Vietnamese Top Brands in 2003”.
- ASEAN's young Entrepreneur Award
