= Joseph Nguyễn Tích Đức =

Vietnamese Roman Catholic bishop

- Bishop of Ban Mê Thuột
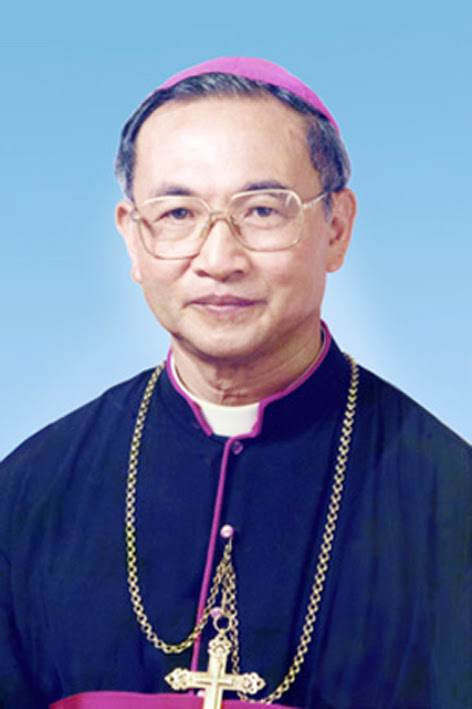
- Church: Catholic Church
- Diocese: Diocese of Ban Mê Thuột
- In office: 29 December 2000 – 17 May 2006
- Predecessor: Joseph Trịnh Chính Trực
- Successor: Vincent Nguyễn Văn Bản
- Previous post: Coadjutor Bishop of Ban Mê Thuột (1997-2000)

Orders
- Ordination: 21 December 1967 by Pierre Nguyễn Huy Mai
- Consecration: 17 June 1997 by Joseph Trịnh Chính Trực

Personal details
- Born: 22 February 1938 Hà Nam province, Tonkin, French Indochina, French Empire
- Died: 23 May 2011 (aged 73) Ho Chi Minh City, Vietnam

Joseph Nguyễn Tích Đức (22 February 1938 – 23 May 2011) was Roman Catholic bishop of the Diocese of Ban Mê Thuôt, Vietnam. Ordained to the priesthood in 1967, Đức became bishop in 1997 and resigned in 2007.
