= Diocese of Ban Mê Thuột =

Roman Catholic diocese in Vietnam

Coordinates: 12.6808°N 108.0450°E

Diocese of Ban Mê Thuột Dioecesis Banmethuotensis Giáo phận Ban Mê Thuột

Catholic
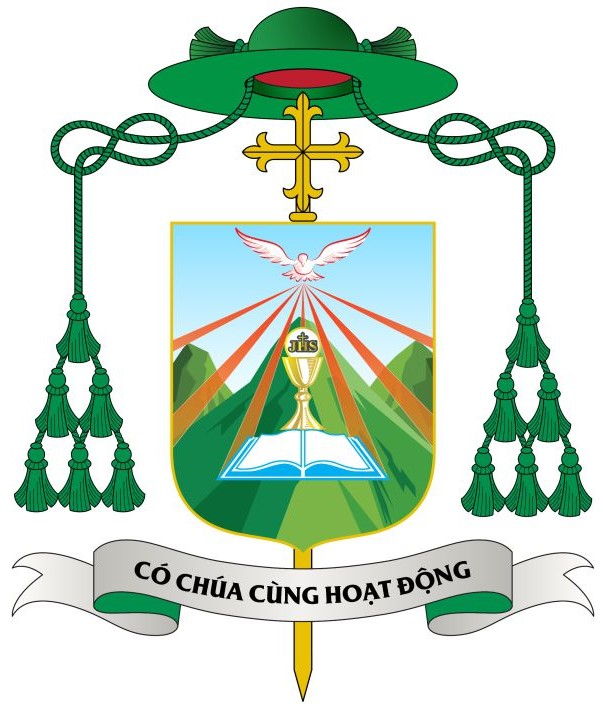
- Coat of arms of Bishop John Baptist Nguyễn Huy Bắc

Location
- Country: Vietnam
- Ecclesiastical province: Huê
- Metropolitan: Huê

Statistics
- Area: 24,475 km^{2} (9,450 sq mi)
- Population: Total; Catholics: (as of 2022); 3,285,606; 468,836 (14.3%)
- Parishes: 118

Information
- Denomination: Catholic
- Sui iuris church: Latin Church
- Rite: Roman Rite
- Established: June 22, 1967
- Cathedral: Cathedral of the Sacred Heart in Buôn Ma Thuột
- Patron saint: Vietnamese Martyrs

Current leadership
- Pope: Leo XIV
- Bishop: John Baptist Nguyễn Huy Bắc
- Metropolitan Archbishop: Joseph Ðặng Ðức Ngân

Website
- gpbanmethuot.vn

Diocese of Ban Mê Thuột (Latin: Dioecesis Banmethuotensis) is a Roman Catholic diocese of Vietnam in the city of Buôn Ma Thuột (f.k.a. Ban Mê Thuột) in Đắk Lắk Province of the Central Highlands region. John Baptist Nguyễn Huy Bắc was appointed bishop in 2024, after Bishop Vincent Nguyễn Văn Bản was appointed Bishop of the Diocese of Hải Phòng in 2022.

The Diocese of Ban Mê Thuôt was erected on 22 June 1967 by Pope Paul VI with territory from the dioceses of Đà Lạt and Kontum. It is a suffragan diocese of the Archdiocese of Huế. More than 10% of the two million people living in its area are Roman Catholics. Many of them belong to ethnic minorities.

== Ordinaries ==
=== Bishops of Ban Mê Thuôt (1967-present) ===
Bishop		Coat of Arms	Period in office	Status	Reference
1	Bishop Pierre Nguyễn Huy Mai		June 22, 1967 – August 04, 1990	Died in office	
2	Bishop Joseph Trịnh Chính Trực		August 04, 1990 – December 29, 2000	Resigned	
3	Bishop Joseph Nguyễn Tích Đức		December 29, 2000 – May 17, 2006	Resigned	
–	Bishop Paul Nguyễn Văn Hoà		May 17, 2006 – February 21, 2009	Apostolic Administrator	
4	Bishop Vincent Nguyễn Văn Bản		February 21, 2009 – March 19, 2022	Transferred to Hai Phong.	
–	Bishop Vincent Nguyễn Văn Bản		March 19, 2022 – July 13, 2024	Apostolic Administrator	
5	Bishop John Baptist Nguyễn Huy Bắc		July 13, 2024 – present	Current Bishop	

Coadjutor Bishop of Ban Mê Thuôt (1981-2000)

Coadjutor Bishop		Coat of Arms	Period in office	Reference
1	Bishop Joseph Trịnh Chính Trực		July 19, 1981 – August 04, 1990	
2	Bishop Joseph Nguyễn Tích Đức		April 21, 1997 – December 29, 2000	
