= Le Hoang Diep Thao =

Vietnamese businesswoman

- Lê Hoàng Diệp Thảo
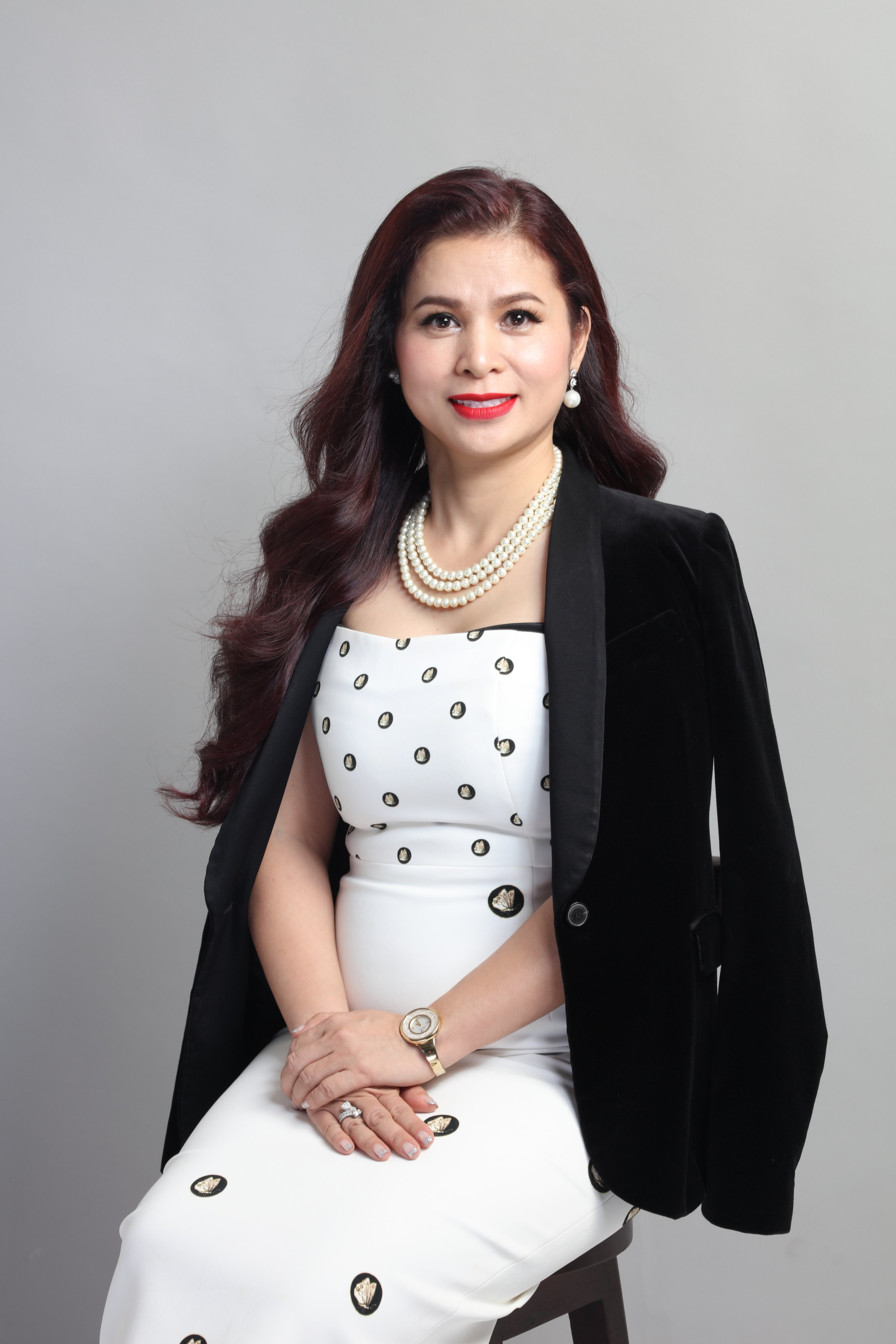
- Born: 1973 (age 52–53); Pleiku, Gia Lai, Vietnam
- Occupation: Entrepreneur
- Years active: 1996 - present
- Known for: Founder & CEO TNI King Coffee, Co-founder Trung Nguyen
- Spouse: Đặng Lê Nguyên Vũ (m. 1998; div. 2021)
- Children: 4
- Website: lehoangdiepthao.com

Lê Hoàng Diệp Thảo (born 1973) is a Vietnam entrepreneur. She is the co-founder of Trung Nguyên Group, where she was involved in managing and operations from 1998 to 2014. She is recognized as a key figure in bringing Trung Nguyên and the G7 instant coffee brand into leading names in the domestic market and expanding internationally. Due to her contributions and broad influence in the industry, Vietnamese media often refer to her as the “Coffee Queen.”

She is the founder and CEO of King Coffee, a company operating in coffee production, processing, and export. Under her leadership, the brand has expanded its distribution network to more than 120 countries and territories, including major markets such as the United States, South Korea, China, Singapore, Russia, and the Middle East.

Besides her business activities, she has launched social initiatives such as Women Can Do and Happy Farmers to support women entrepreneurs and improve the livelihoods of coffee farmers in Vietnam.

In publishing and media, she is the author of the autobiography The Queen of King Coffee, launched at Expo 2020 Dubai in 2021, sharing her experience in managing and developing business in the coffee industry. She has received several leadership awards from international organizations such as Global Brands Magazine and Global Business Review. In addition, she has held positions in specialized organizations, notably as Vice President of the Vietnam Coffee - Cocoa Association (VICOFA).

During the 2025–2026 period, she has participated in initiating and promoting international cooperation initiatives, notably the Global Coffee Heritage (GCH) 2025, first held in Đà Lạt in December 2025. Continuing this roadmap, at the International Coffee Conference held in Hanoi in March 2026, the declaration of the Global Coffee Alliance (GCA) was signed, aiming to connect stakeholders across the value chain and promote the sustainable development of the global coffee industry. On this occasion, she also launched AI Coffee Academy, a technology startup company to contribute practical value to the coffee industry workforce in Vietnam and worldwide.

== Early life ==
Lê Hoàng Diệp Thảo was born and raised in a well-off family in Gia Lai. After graduating in 1994, she worked at the 108 Call Center of the Gia Lai Post Office. During her time there, through customer support calls, she became acquainted with Đặng Lê Nguyên Vũ, who was then a medical student. Both shared a common interest in the coffee industry. This later became the foundation for their joint entrepreneurial journey and the establishment of the Trung Nguyên brand. Ms Diệp Thảo accompanied and supported Mr Vũ, who was her boyfriend at the time, in developing and implementing the plan to establish Trung Nguyên in 1996.

In 1997, when Trung Nguyên faced difficulties in the Long Xuyên market, she mobilized financial resources from her family to help maintain the company's operations. In 1998, the couple got married and moved to Ho Chi Minh City to continue developing the business.

During the company's recovery period following its early challenges, when the initial team consisted of just over 15 employees, she participated in the company's management, directly overseeing finance, human resources, and establishing of strategic partnership networks for the group.

Alongside her business activities, she continuously enhanced her management capabilities through advanced training programs in finance and business administration in Japan (2002), Singapore (2004), and the United States (2016).

== Building and Developing Trung Nguyên ==
On August 20, 1998, Lê Hoàng Diệp Thảo opened the first Trung Nguyên coffee shop at 587 Nguyễn Kiệm Street, Phú Nhuận District, Ho Chi Minh City. During the early stage, the business model was implemented through market testing activities, including a seven-day free coffee aimed at attracting customers and building initial brand awareness.

As the business developed, a second coffee shop was opened at the Pasteur – Điện Biên Phủ intersection area. At that time, it was one of the first coffee shop in Ho Chi Minh City with a beautiful space, combined on-site service with roasted coffee retail operations.

In 2000, Ms Thảo was appointed Head of the Trung Nguyên Coffee Enterprise Cooperative branch in Ho Chi Minh City, where she was responsible for managing and developing the franchise system. Based on her business experience, she contributed to making Trung Nguyên as a pioneering company in implementing the coffee chain franchise model in Vietnam.

In 2001, after a business trip to Germany, she participated in proposing and developing the G7 instant coffee product line, marking Trung Nguyên's transition into deep processing and expanding the consumer goods market.

From 2006 onward, she was as Vice Chairwoman of the Board of Directors and Deputy Chief Executive Officer of the Trung Nguyên Group, participating in managing and developing business operations during the company's expansion period.

In addition, she was Chief Executive Officer and legal representative of Trung Nguyên Instant Coffee Company in Bình Dương, directly participating in managing production and product development.

The period from 2006 to 2014 is recognized as a phase of significant expansion for Trung Nguyên. In 2008, she participated in the establishment of Trung Nguyên International in Singapore, marking the expansion into international markets. Business locations were launched at Changi Airport and the Liang Court area, contributing to the brand's presence in overseas markets. During this period, Trung Nguyên gradually established an international business network and developed from a domestic brand into a global brand.

=== King Coffee's Transition and Establishment Period ===
From 2013 to 2015, management operations within the Trung Nguyên Group underwent significant changes, leading to disputes related to corporate governance and executive authority among the involved parties. In this context, Ms Lê Hoàng Diệp Thảo no longer held a direct executive role at Trung Nguyên.

In 2015, she established the King Coffee brand, developing it under an integrated coffee enterprise model, focused on production, processing, and export, drawing on the experience she gained while participating in the development of Trung Nguyên.

King Coffee Development

In October 2016, the King Coffee brand was officially launched in the United States, then expanded to South Korea, China, Singapore, and other countries. In July 2017, the brand was officially introduced to the Vietnamese market.

Since 2018, King Coffee has been developing its coffee shop chain system, with the first store opening in Pleiku. Business locations were subsequently expanded into multiple markets, including South Korea and the United States.

Alongside the expansion of its system, King Coffee focused on product development and international distribution channels. By 2020, the brand had been exported to more than 120 countries and territories. King Coffee products gained access to major distribution systems in the United States, including shopping malls and e-commerce platforms.

Throughout its development, King Coffee has been recognized by many domestic and international organizations, receiving awards for its brand and growth rate in the international market, notably the “Fastest Growing Vietnamese Coffee Brand UAE 2022” award granted by Global Business Review; “Top 10 Coffee Brands from Southeast Asia 2023” announced by Asia Business Outlook. The company also received multiple domestic certifications and awards related to the food and beverage industry and consumer branding.

In 2021, as part of activities promoting Vietnamese coffee to international markets, and under the initiative of Lê Hoàng Diệp Thảo, Vietnamese Robusta coffee was recognized with a record by WorldKings for achievements related to coffee production, culture, and coffee appreciation arts. This activity took place alongside programs introducing Vietnamese coffee at Expo 2020 Dubai.

In recent years, her activities have expanded into international cooperation initiatives to promote the culture and the value of the coffee industry. She participated in founding programs under the frameworks of Global Coffee Heritage and Global Coffee Alliance, contributing to the connection of coffee-growing regions and the promotion of sustainable standards for the Vietnamese coffee industry in the global market.

Promoting International Cooperation Initiatives in the Coffee Industry

During the 2025–2026 period, the activities of Lê Hoàng Diệp Thảo were associated with several notable milestones to promote the position of the Vietnamese coffee industry through internationally connected initiatives. These activities were frequently described by the media as efforts to combine heritage value preservation and sustainable supply chains development.

In particular, in December 2025, the Global Coffee Heritage (GCH) festival was held the first time in Đà Lạt, attracting the participation of government, experts, businesses, and coffee communities from both Vietnam and abroad. The event was oriented as a comprehensive forum, combining cultural, economic, and commercial elements, to honor the value of coffee heritage values while promoting connections within the global value chain.

Within the framework of the program, many core issues concerning the Vietnamese and global coffee industries were discussed, including value chain development, product quality enhancement, and national brand positioning. The media coverage of the event also emphasized the role of multilateral cooperation and building a common narrative for the Vietnamese coffee industry in the context of globalization, in which the “heritage” element was viewed as a foundation for increasing competitive value and sustainable development.

Continuing this series of activities, the International Coffee Conference was held in Hanoi on March 26, 2026, with the participation of representatives from 21 diplomatic delegations, along with organizations, businesses, and industry experts. At the event, the Global Coffee Alliance (GCA) was signed as a collaborative platform to connect stakeholders across the coffee value chain, aiming for sustainable development and increased value for the global coffee industry.

At the same time, several long-term orientations related to the Global Coffee Heritage ecosystem were also mentioned, including the development of sustainable coffee-growing regions, international trade connectivity, and integrated coffee economy models. These initiatives were regarded as part of broader efforts to reposition the role of Vietnamese coffee within the global supply chain.

Awards and Recognition

Throughout her career, Ms Lê Hoàng Diệp Thảo has received numerous recognitions from domestic and international organizations for her contributions to the development of the coffee industry. She was the first Vietnamese speaker invited to deliver a presentation at the Allegra World Coffee Portal CEO Forum held in Los Angeles, USA. In terms of industry association roles, she was elected Vice Chairwoman of the Vietnam Coffee – Cocoa Association for the 2017–2020 term.

In 2020, she received the “The Most Admired CEO in Vietnam” award in the Food & Beverage category from Global Brands Magazine (UK). In 2022, she was further honored with the “Vietnamese Entrepreneur of the Year” award presented by Global Business Review (UAE).

In 2023, she was selected by the International Finance Corporation (IFC) for the “Top 50 Global Professional & Career Women” list, recognizing her contributions to business activities and the advancement of women's roles in the economy.

Alongside her business activities, she has also participated in implementing community initiatives such as Women Can Do and Happy Farmers, aimed at supporting women entrepreneurs and promoting sustainable development for farmers, thereby contributing to the spread of social values associated with the coffee industry.

Community and Social Activities

In addition to her business activities, Lê Hoàng Diệp Thảo has participated in and implemented various community initiatives in the fields of livelihood support, education, and social welfare. One notable example is the Women Can Do initiative, which aims to support women entrepreneurs and enhance personal financial capabilities.

Community programs implemented by her and her businesses have been carried out in many localities, focusing on supporting ethnic minority communities, coffee farmers, students, and disadvantaged groups. In addition, educational programs, scholarships, charitable activities for children, and initiatives supporting local communities have been maintained on a regular basis.

During the pandemic period, her business implemented support activities involving medical supplies and essential goods, including face masks, protective equipment, ventilators, food, and other necessities. The company also provided support to quarantine facilities, hospitals, and frontline forces in several localities.

Several activities related to the coffee industry were also mentioned by the media in the context of community connection and multilateral cooperation, particularly through initiatives and events within the frameworks of Global Coffee Heritage and Global Coffee Alliance.

Views and Public Statements

In media activities and industry forums, Lê Hoàng Diệp Thảo has frequently shared her views on enhancing the position of the Vietnamese coffee industry in international markets, emphasizing the goal of building Vietnamese coffee brands capable of competing with global enterprises.

She has also discussed business development thinking in the context of changing market conditions, expressing the view that businesses need to proactively adapt and broaden their vision in order to overcome challenges. In addition, her public statements often encourage a proactive mindset, particularly among women participating in business and building financial independence.
