= Sacred Heart Cathedral, Buôn Ma Thuột =

Sacred Heart Cathedral
- Cathédrale du Sacré-Cœur
- Nhà Thờ Chình Toà Thánh Tâm Chúa Giêsu
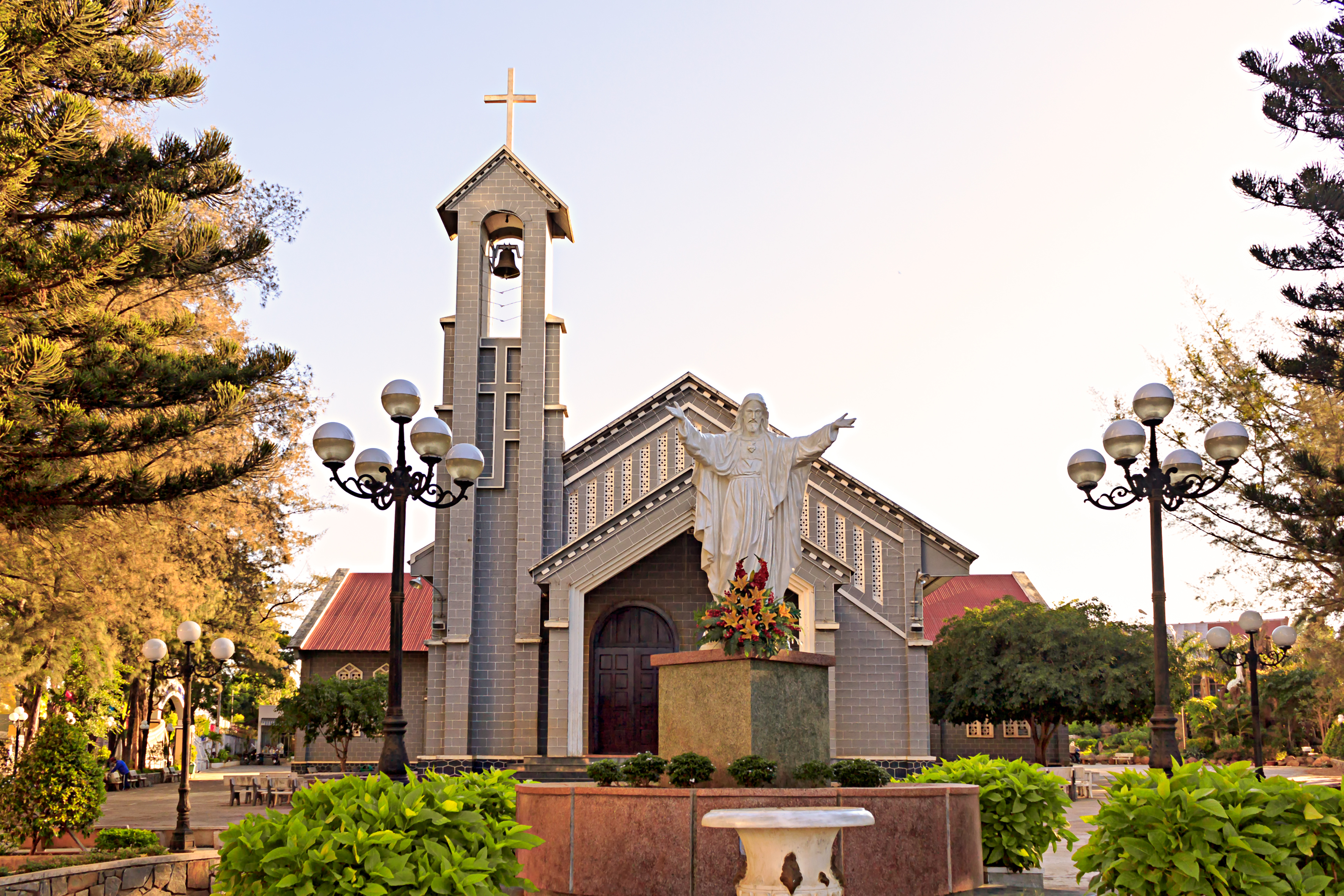
- Sacred Heart Cathedral
- Location: Buôn Ma Thuột
- Country: Vietnam
- Denomination: Roman Catholic Church

History
- Founded: 1957
- Dedication: 1958

The Sacred Heart Cathedral (Vietnamese: Nhà Thờ Chình Toà Thánh Tâm Chúa Giêsu; French: Cathédrale du Sacré-Cœur), also called Buôn Ma Thuột Cathedral, is a religious building that is affiliated with the Catholic Church and is found in 2 Phan Chu Trinh in the city of Buon Ma Thuot, capital of Dak Lak province in the Central Highlands of Vietnam. It is the cathedral of the Diocese of Ban Mê Thuột.

Construction of the church began in 1957 and was completed the following year with space for 1,200 faithful seated.

The church follows the Roman or Latin rite and is the principal church of the Diocese of Ban Me Thuot (Dioecesis Banmethuotensis or Giáo phận Ban Mê Thuột) which was created in 1967 by Pope Paul VI by bull Qui Dei benignitate.

The cathedral is under the pastoral responsibility of Bishop Vincent Nguyễn Văn Bản.

== See also ==
- Roman Catholicism in Vietnam
- Sacred Heart Cathedral (disambiguation)
