= Trung Nguyên =

Vietnamese coffee business group

Trung Nguyên Group
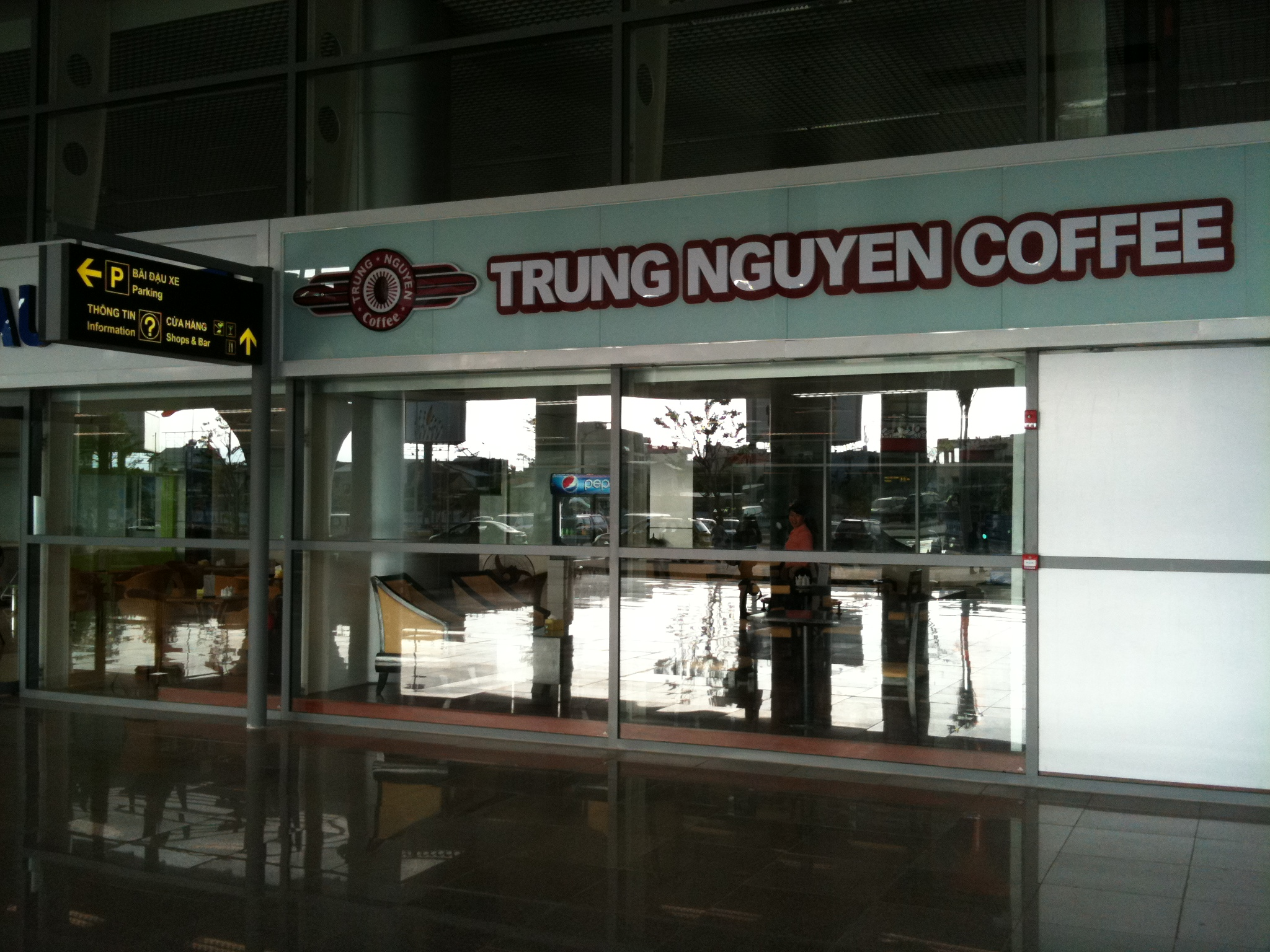
- Industry: Coffee
- Founded: 1996; 30 years ago in Buôn Ma Thuột, Vietnam
- Founders: Dang Le Nguyen Vu and Le Hoang Diep Thao
- Headquarters: Ho Chi Minh City
- Products: Legendee, G7 Instant Coffee, Roasted and Ground Coffee
- Website: trungnguyenlegend.com

Trung Nguyên is a Vietnamese business group involved in the production, processing and distribution of coffee. The firm was founded in 1996 in Buôn Ma Thuột, Đắk Lắk Province by Dang Le Nguyen Vu and Le Hoang Diep Thao upon realizing the potential and opportunities for the development of the coffee industry in opening Vietnam’s economy. Trung Nguyên is the largest domestic coffee brand within Vietnam, and exports its products to more than 60 countries, including major markets such as the United States, the European Union, the United Kingdom, Germany, China, Canada, Russia, Japan, Dubai, Australia, and ASEAN countries, including its international hub in Singapore. The group is composed of several subsidiaries, among them Trung Nguyên Corporation JSC, Trung Nguyên Instant Coffee Company JSC, Trung Nguyên Coffee LLC, G7 Commercial Services Company, Đặng Lê Tourism Company JSC and Trung Nguyên Franchising Company JSC. Its most successful product is G7 instant coffee, which took top domestic position in 2016 and has recorded 200% growth in its export markets. Following a high-profile separation with her husband, in 2016 Le Hoang Diep Thao established an independent spin-off firm in Singapore, Trung Nguyên International, which she used as a springboard for her own coffee chain TNI King Coffee. King Coffee now exports its products to more than 120 countries worldwide.

== Milestones ==
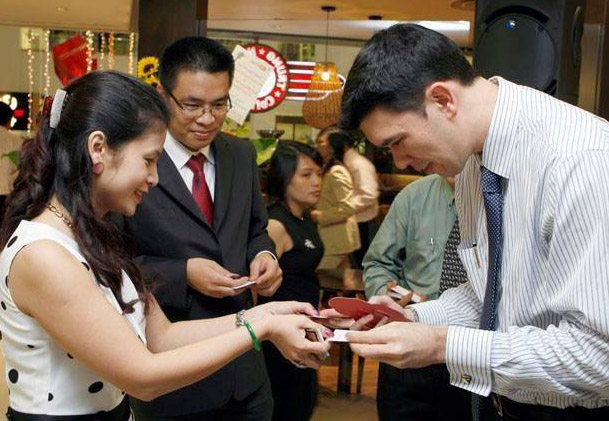
Mme. Le Hoang Diep Thao at a Trung Nguyen coffee event

- 1996: Dang Le Nguyen Vu and Le Hoang Diep Thao founded Trung Nguyên in Buôn Ma Thuột city – Vietnam’s coffee capital.
- 1998: The couple opened the first coffee shop at 587 Nguyễn Kiệm, Phú Nhuận in Hồ Chí Minh city.
- 2003: Launched G7 instant coffee at Saigon's Reunification Palace with blind taste test, in which 89% of participants prefer G7 over rival product
- 2006: Selected to serve at APEC 2006, commenced "Coffee sanctuary" project in Buon Ma Thuot.
- 2008: Launches operation in Singapore.
- 2010: Trung Nguyên coffee products exported to more than 60 countries around the world, especially the U.S., Canada, Russia, England, Germany, Japan, China, ASEAN, etc.
- 2012: G7 Coffee named favorite coffee brand in Vietnamese 3-in-1 instant coffee market.

== Products ==
- Legendee simulated kopi luwak coffee
- Fresh coffee
- G7 instant coffee: G7 3in1, G7 2in1, G7 Strong X2, Pure Black, Cappuccino, Passiona, White Coffee.
- Roasted and ground coffee: Filter Coffee (1,2,3,4,5), Creative Coffee (1,2,3,4,5,8), Espresso, Blend (I, S, N, Premium Blend, Gourmet Blend, House Blend).
- Bean coffee
- Trung Nguyên coffee products use a variety of different coffee beans, including Robusta, Arabica, and Excelsa.

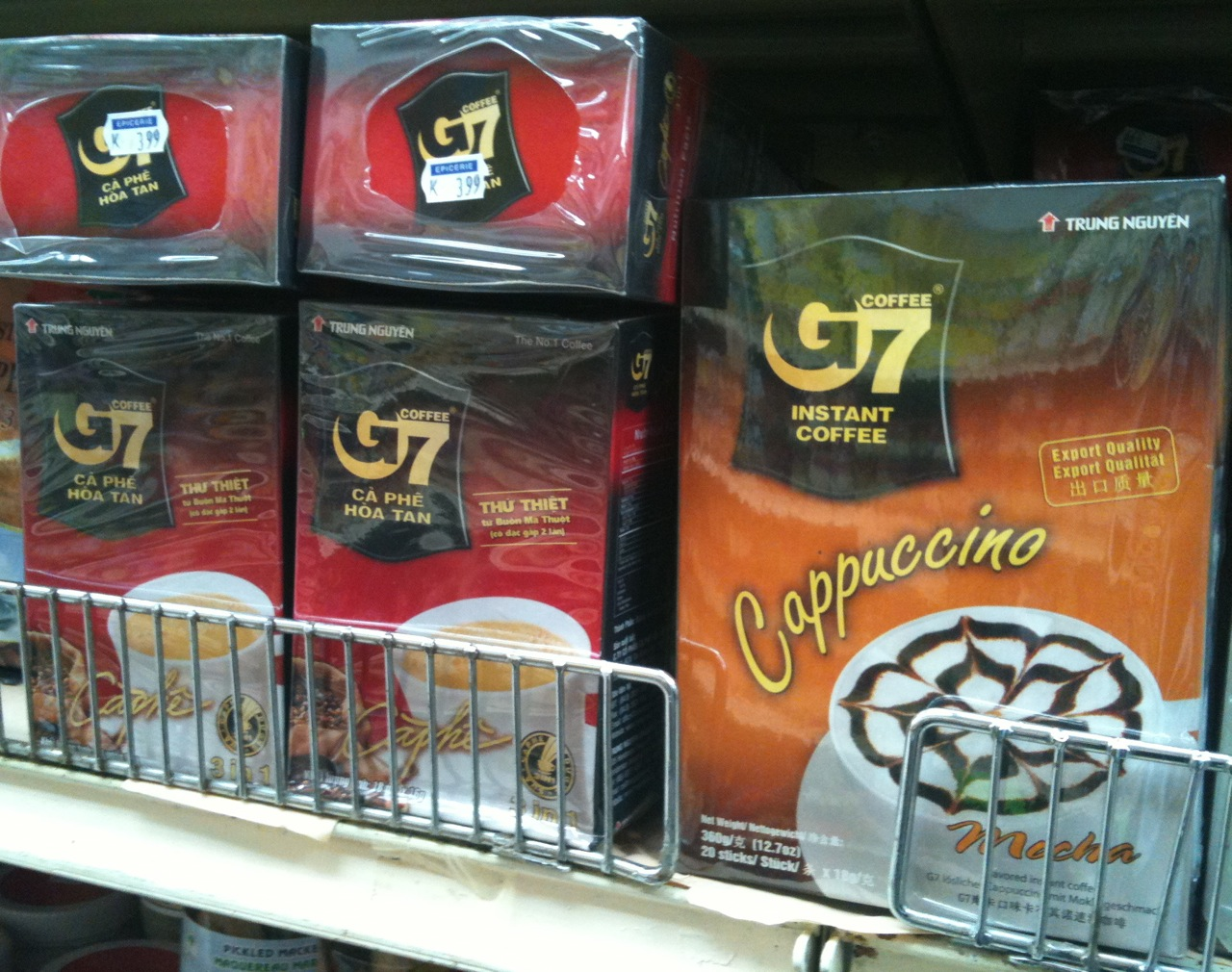
Boxes of Trung Nguyên's G7-brand instant coffee

=== Weasel and Legendee coffee ===
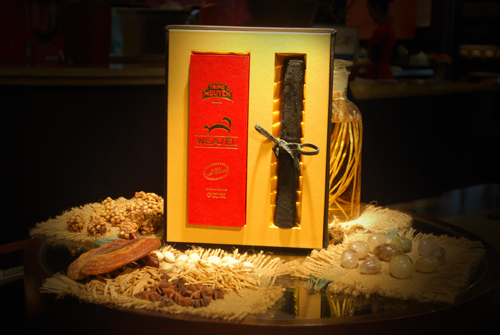
Weasel Coffee of Trung Nguyên

Trung Nguyên is known as an important producer and distributor of kopi luwak (Vietnamese: cà phê chồn), weasel coffee Trung Nguyen, also known as civet coffee, both natural and simulated. Kopi luwak, widely noted as the most expensive coffee in the world, is coffee made from the beans of coffee berries which have been eaten by the Asian Palm Civet (Paradoxurus hermaphroditus) and other related civets, then passed through its digestive tract. After gathering, thorough washing, sun drying, light roasting, and brewing, these beans yield an aromatic coffee with much less bitterness.

Trung Nguyên's Legendee brand coffee is a simulated kopi luwak product, which uses synthetic enzymes to mimic the civet's gastric acid, producing effects on flavour similar to actual kopi luwak, and reducing the need to rely on the civet, which is now endangered in Vietnam due to excessive hunting. In August 2010, Trung Nguyên CEO Dang Le Nguyen Vu reported that the company had begun manually producing its own natural (non-simulated) kopi luwak under its Weasel sub-brand. Due to the complicated production process, only 40–50 kg of Weasel coffee are produced annually. It is much more expensive than any of the company's other products: a 1 kg bag of Weasel coffee costs $3,000, six times higher than Indonesian kopi luwak. Dang has claimed, however, that Trung Nguyên's Vietnamese version is of higher quality, since production depends on wild or free range civets who choose the best coffee beans themselves, instead of being caged and force-fed

== Production and facilities ==
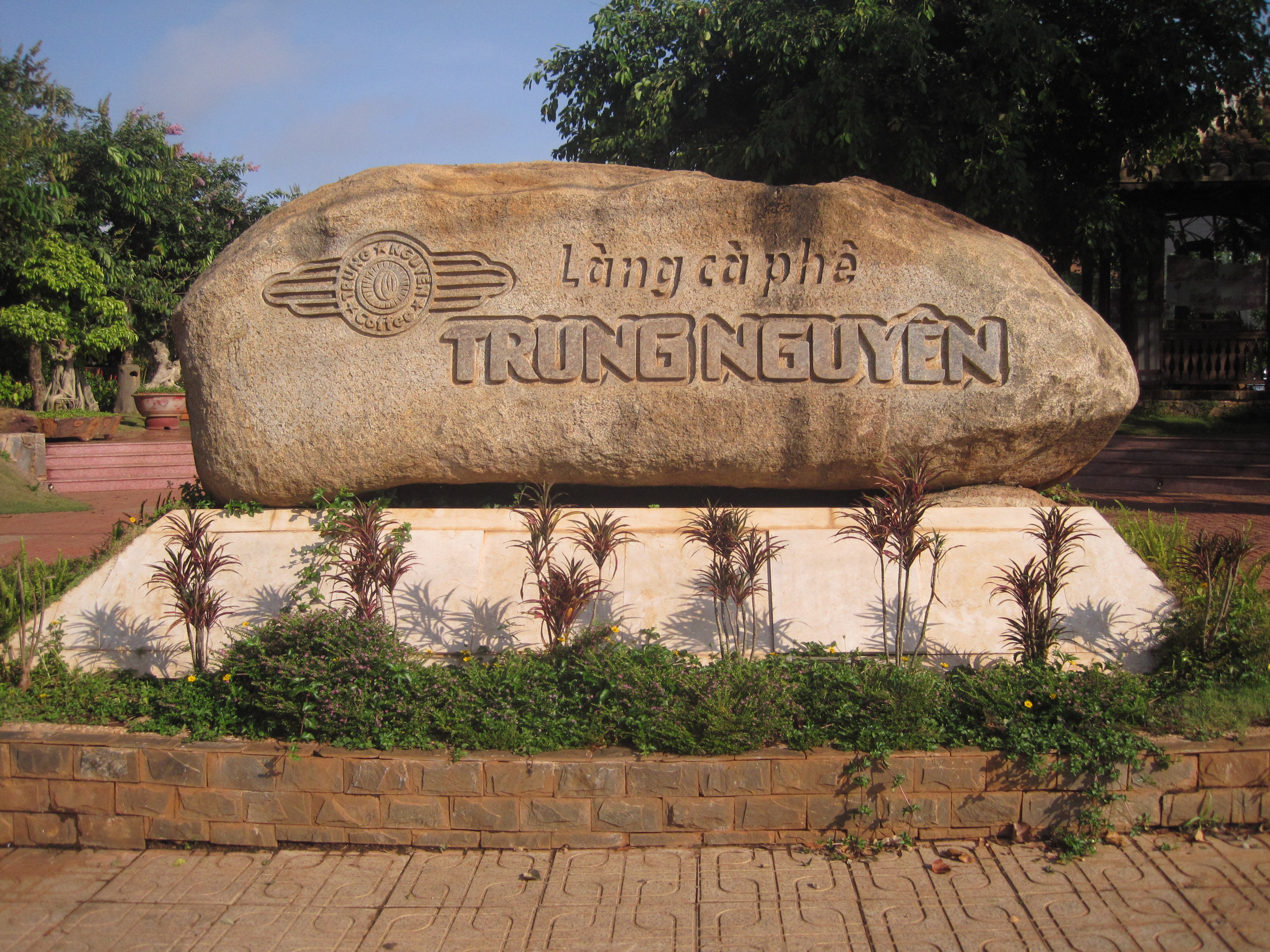
Trung Nguyên Coffee Village

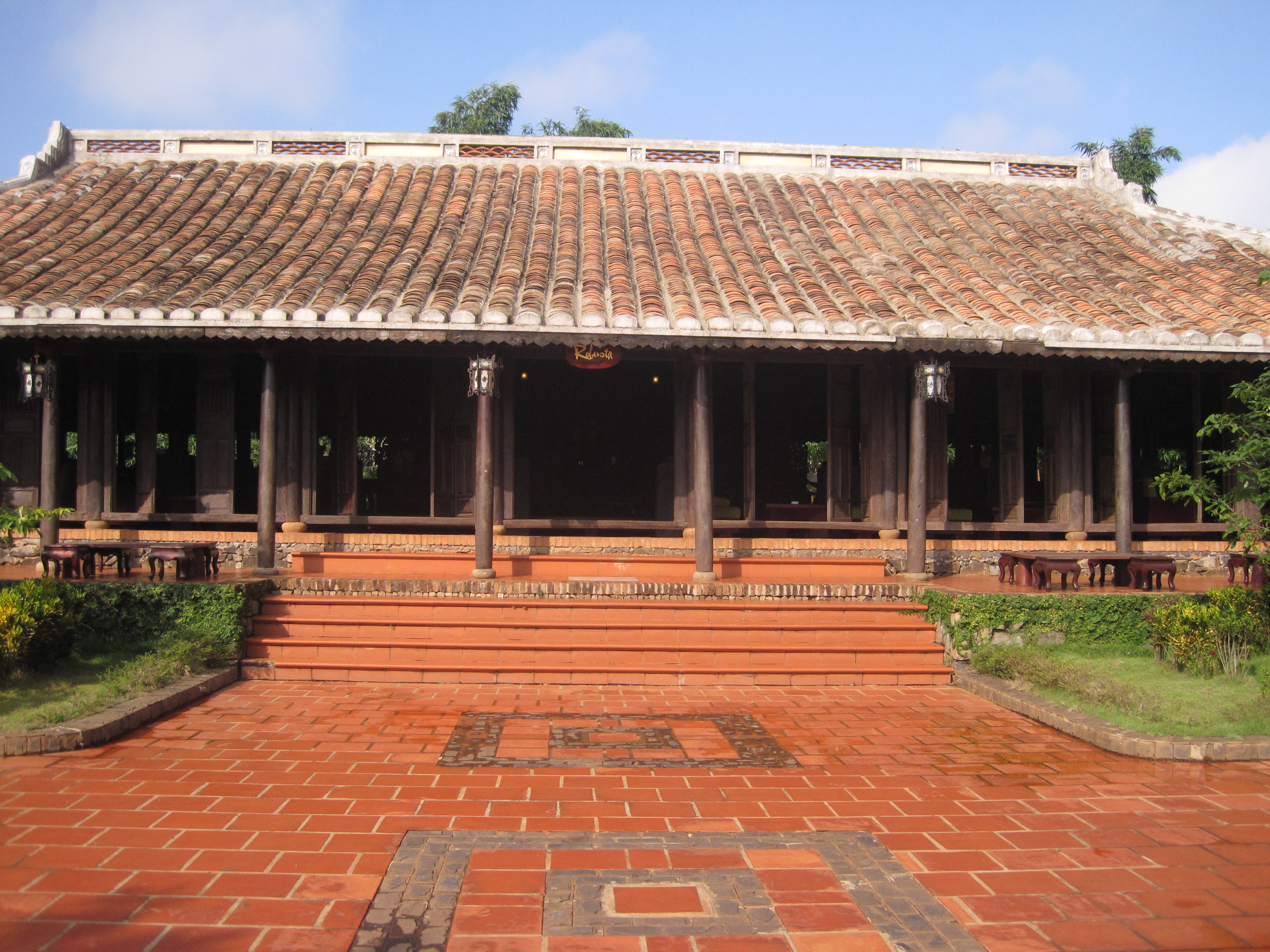
An area in Trung Nguyên Coffee Village

Currently, Trung Nguyen owns the system of four factories:

- Bắc Giang Instant Coffee Factory
- Buôn Ma Thuột Roasted and Ground Coffee Factory
- Trung Nguyên - Saigon Coffee Factory
- Bình Dương Instant Coffee Factory

== Distribution ==
VOA video describing how the company has improved production recently, and a description of the overall state of the coffee harvest in the country

Along with producing and processing coffee beans, Trung Nguyên operates a nationwide chain of over 1,000 coffee shops in Vietnam to distribute its products, the first of which opened in October 1998 in Ho Chi Minh City. The first coffeehouse in Hanoi opened in the year 2000, by which time 100 outlets had already been established. Throughout the following years, franchises were opened in Japan, Thailand, Cambodia, Malaysia and China. The first outlets outside of Asia opened in Germany and New York City in the year 2006. The company's future plans include the further development of its international presence in China, the United States and Europe.

== Prizes and titles ==
- The prize of "The Golden Star of the Vietnamese land in 2003" offered by The Vietnamese Young Enterprises Association.
- Elected 4 years in a succession of "Top quality Vietnamese goods" by the customers (1999- 2002)
- Elected in "Top 5" of The Branch of Agricultural Products & Food in choosing "Vietnamese goods of Top quality" in 2002.
- General Director – Mr. Dang Le Nguyen Vu has won the Prize of Red Star Enterprise awarded by the Vietnamese Young Enterprise Association in 2001.
- Being the first Vietnamese Company that has applied the form of franchising trademark in domestic and overseas.
- Being the leading coffee trademark in Vietnam.

Trung Nguyen coffee growers have been certified by EUREPGAP and Utz Kapeh for "safe and sustainable" coffee growing practice.

== See also ==
- List of coffeehouse chains
- Trung Nguyên Legend Café
