= Trung Nguyên Legend Café =

Vietnam-based coffee shop chain

Trung Nguyên Legend Café is a chain of coffee shops, based in Vietnam. It has four factories and approximately 110 cafes, as of 2025.

== Description ==
The menu includes Vietnamese coffee drinks and European espresso drinks. Phin coffee is made with civet coffee, condensed milk, and egg coffee.

== History and locations ==
There are approximately 110 cafes globally, as of 2025.

=== Asia ===
There were three cafes in Shanghai in 2025.

=== North America ===
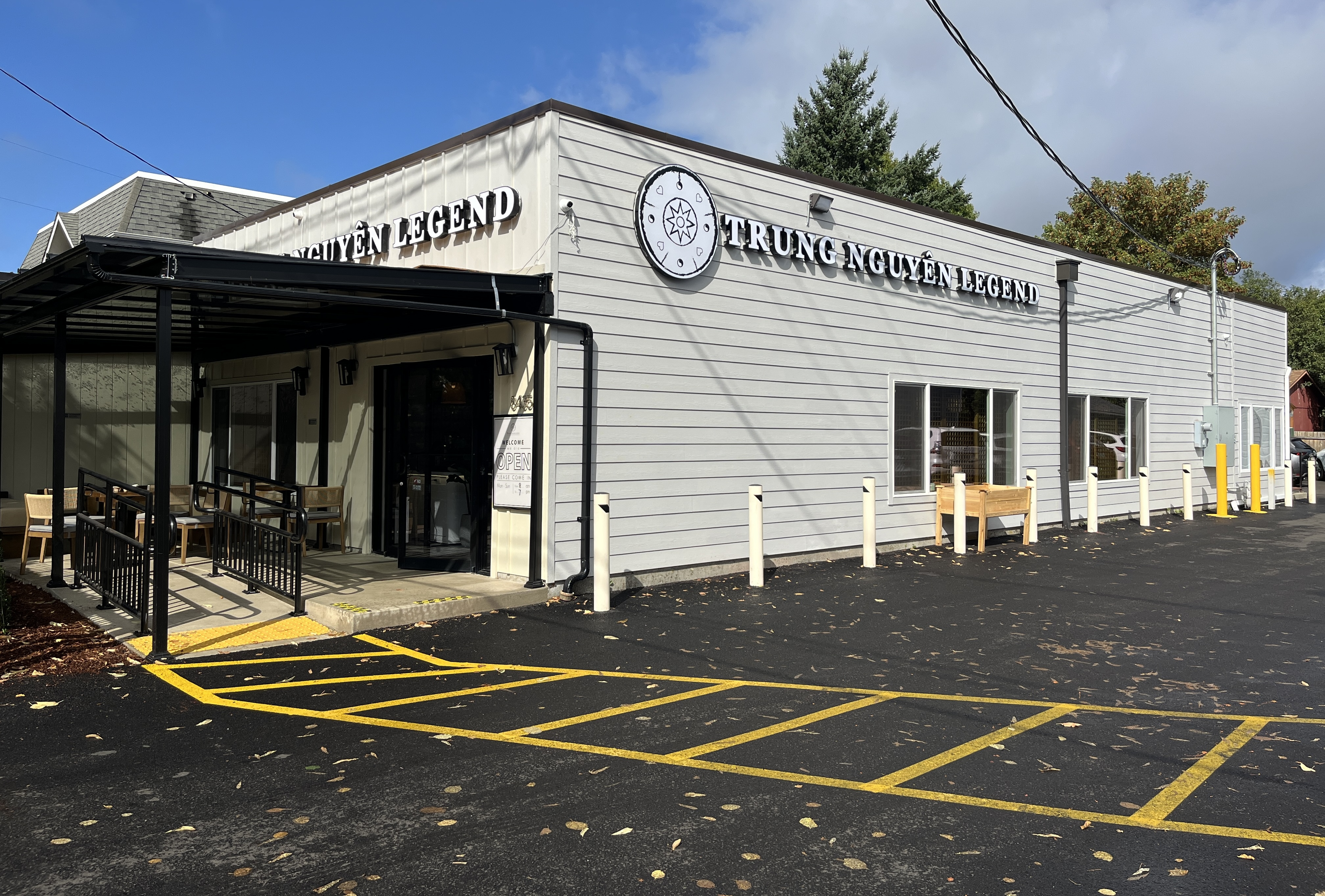
Exterior of the shop in southeast Portland, Oregon, 2025

The first location in the U.S. opened in Los Angeles, California, in 2023. The first location in the Pacific Northwest opened in Portland, Oregon, in 2025. The 1,800 square foot cafe in southeast Portland's Powellhurst-Gilbert neighborhood operates in a space that previously housed the billiard hall and restaurant Pho Le II. In addition to the chain's standard drink options, the Portland location serves bánh mì, pho, and rice dishes. Owner Brad Tran has also made plans to open another location in Beaverton, in the Portland metropolitan area.

== See also ==
- Coffee production in Vietnam
- List of restaurant chains
- Trung Nguyên, coffee business group
