= Buôn Ma Thuột =

- Ward
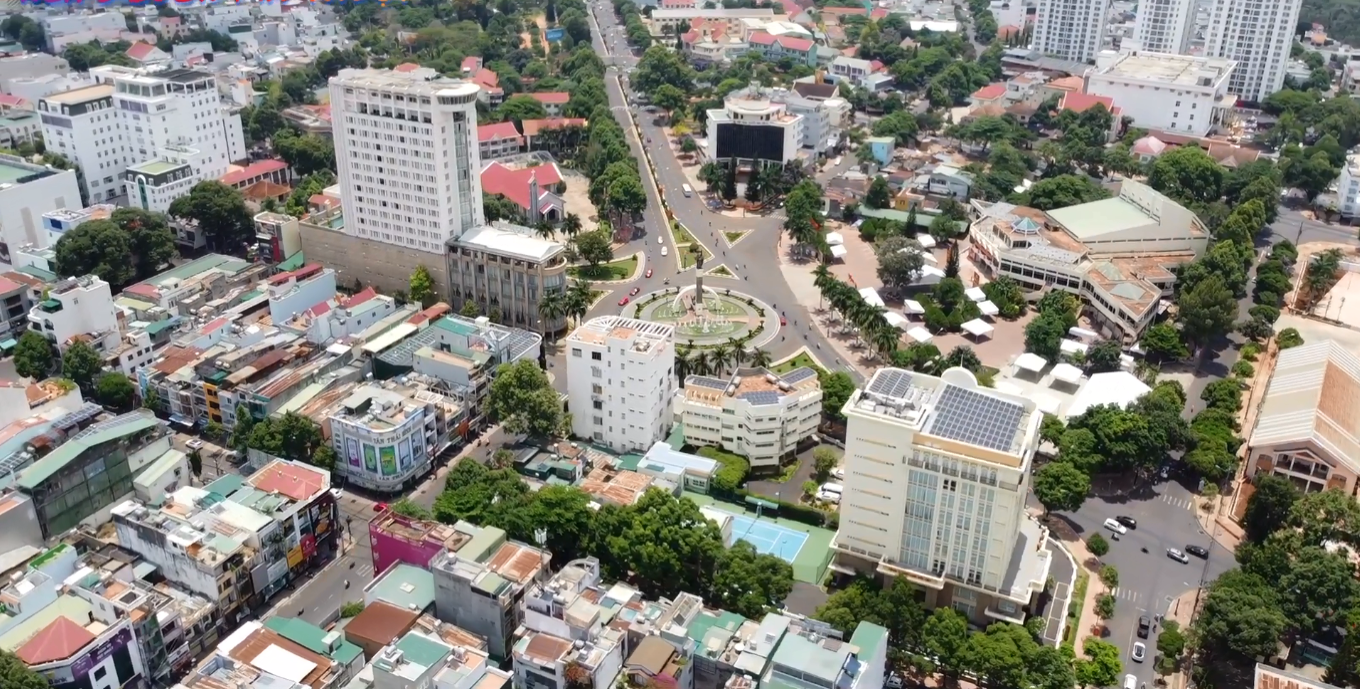
- Buôn Ma Thuột ward center from above
- Interactive map of Buôn Ma Thuột
- Coordinates: 12.68449303367259°N 108.05087184406317°E
- Country: Vietnam
- Region: South Central Coast and Central Highlands
- Province: Đắk Lắk
- Established: 16 June 2025
- Administrative headquarters: 1 Lý Nam Đế Street

Area
  - Total: 71.99 km^{2} (27.80 sq mi)

Population (2025)
  - Total: 169,596
  - Density: 2,355/km^{2} (6,100/sq mi)
- Website: buonmathuot.daklak.gov.vn

Buôn Ma Thuột is a ward and the administrative center of Đắk Lắk province, Vietnam. The ward inherited its name from the former city of Buôn Ma Thuột, which was the provincial capital of Đắk Lắk.

On 16 June 2025:

- The operation of district-level administrative units throughout Vietnam was terminated from 1 July 2025.
- The entire area and population of Thành Công, Tân Tiến, Tân Thành, Tự An, and Tân Lợi wards and Cư Êbur commune, formerly part of Buôn Ma Thuột city, Đắk Lắk province, were merged to form a new ward named Buôn Ma Thuột.
