= Vietnam =

Country in Southeast Asia

Socialist Republic of Viet Nam Cộng hòa Xã hội chủ nghĩa Việt Nam
- Flag Emblem
- Motto: Độc lập – Tự do – Hạnh phúc "Independence – Freedom – Happiness"
- Anthem: Tiến quân ca "The Song of the Marching Troops"
- Location of Vietnam (green) in Southeast Asia
- Capital: Hanoi; 21°2′N 105°51′E
- Largest city: Ho Chi Minh City; 10°48′N 106°39′E
- Official language: Vietnamese
- Ethnic groups (2019): 85.32% Viet (Kinh); 14.68% others
- Religion (2021): 73% no religion / folk; 14.3% Buddhism; 7.1% Catholicism; 1.5% Hoahaoism; 1.2% Caodaism; 1.2% Protestantism; 0.08% Islam; 1.62% others
- Demonym: Vietnamese
- Government: Unitary communist state
  - Party General Secretary and President (Note: The most powerful political position is General Secretary of the Communist Party of Vietnam. The general secretary leads the Politburo and the Secretariat, Vietnam's top decision-making bodies, making the officeholder the de facto leader of Vietnam.): Tô Lâm
  - Prime Minister: Lê Minh Hưng
  - National Assembly Chairman: Trần Thanh Mẫn
- Legislature: National Assembly

Formation
  - Han's annexation: 111 BC
  - Independence from China: 939
  - Regaining independence: 1428
  - Nguyễn's unification: 1802
  - Protectorate Treaty: 25 August 1883
  - Democratic Republic of Vietnam: 2 September 1945
  - North–South partition: 21 July 1954
  - Socialist Republic of Vietnam: 2 July 1976

Area
  - Total: 331,344.82 (Note: The area of Vietnam mentioned here is based on the land area statistics provided by the Vietnamese government. However, alternative figures exist. According to the CIA World Factbook, Vietnam's total area is 331,210 square kilometres, while the BBC cites a slightly different measurement of 331,699 square kilometres.) km^{2} (127,932.95 sq mi) (66th)
  - Water (%): 6.38

Population
  - 2025 estimate: ▲102,300,000 (16th)
  - 2019 census: 96,208,984
  - Density: 309/km^{2} (800.3/sq mi) (43rd)
- GDP (PPP): 2026 estimate
  - Total: ▲$2.059 trillion (24th)
  - Per capita: ▲$19,974 (102th)
- GDP (nominal): 2026 estimate
  - Total: ▲$542.130 billion (33rd)
  - Per capita: ▲$5,259 (121st)
- Gini (2022): ▼36.1 medium inequality
- HDI (2023): ▲0.766 high (93rd)
- Currency: Vietnamese đồng (₫) (VND)
- Time zone: UTC+07:00 (Vietnam Standard Time)
- Calling code: +84
- ISO 3166 code: VN
- Internet TLD: .vn

Vietnam, (Note: Vietnamese: Việt Nam [vîət nāːm]. The spelling "Viet Nam" is sometimes used in English by local and government-operated media. "Viet Nam" is, in fact, formally designated and recognised by the Government of Vietnam, the United Nations and the International Organization for Standardization as the standardised country name. See also other spellings.) officially the Socialist Republic of Viet Nam (SRV), (Note: Vietnamese: Cộng hòa Xã hội chủ nghĩa Việt Nam. Also seen with the alternate spelling as Socialist Republic of Vietnam, or Socialist Republic of Việt Nam, by Vietnamese orthography.) is a country at the eastern edge of Mainland Southeast Asia. With an area of about 331,000 square kilometres and a population of over 102 million, it is the world's 16th-most populous country. One of two communist states in Southeast Asia, (Note: The other one being Laos.) Vietnam is bordered by China to the north, and Laos and Cambodia to the west; it lies along the Gulf of Thailand to the southwest and the South China Sea to the east, where it has shared and disputed maritime borders with other countries. Its capital is Hanoi, while its largest city is Ho Chi Minh City.

Vietnam was inhabited by the Paleolithic age, with states established in the first millennium BC on the Red River Delta. The Han dynasty annexed northern and central Vietnam, which were subsequently under Chinese rule from 111 BC until the first dynasty emerged in 939. Successive monarchical dynasties absorbed Chinese influences through Confucianism and Buddhism, and expanded southward to the Mekong Delta, conquering Champa. The Nguyễn—the last imperial dynasty—surrendered to France in 1883. In 1887, its territory was integrated into French Indochina as three separate regions. In the aftermath of World War II, the communist-led Viet Minh coalition front launched the August Revolution and declared Vietnam's independence from the Empire of Japan in 1945. After World War II, France returned to reassert colonial control in the First Indochina War, and was defeated in 1954 amid the global Cold War. As a result of the accords signed between the Viet Minh and France, Vietnam was also separated into two parts. The Vietnam War later broke out between the communist North Vietnam, supported by the Soviet Union and China, and the anti-communist South Vietnam, supported by the United States. Upon the North Vietnamese victory in 1975, Vietnam reunified as a communist state that self-designated as a socialist state under the Communist Party of Vietnam (CPV) in 1976.

A planned economy, a trade embargo by the West, and wars with Cambodia and China crippled the country further. In 1986, the CPV launched economic and political reforms similar to the Chinese economic reforms, transforming the country to a socialist-oriented market economy. The reforms facilitated Vietnamese reintegration into the global economy and politics. Vietnam is a developing country with an upper-middle–income economy. It has corruption, censorship, and environmental issues, and a criticized human rights record. Vietnam is part of international and intergovernmental institutions, including the ASEAN, the APEC, the Non-Aligned Movement, the OIF, and the WTO. It has assumed a seat on the United Nations Security Council twice.

== Etymology ==
The name Việt Nam (pronounced [viə̂tˀ nāːm], chữ Hán: 越南), literally "Viet South", means per Vietnamese word order "Viet of the South"; meanwhile, per Classical Chinese word order, "Việt Nam" ambiguously means either "South of the Viet" or "Viet people's Southern country".

A variation of the name, Nanyue (or Nam Việt, 南越), was first documented in the 2nd century BC. The term "Việt" (Chinese: 越; pinyin: Yuè; Cantonese Yale: Yuht; Wade–Giles: Yüeh^{4}) in Early Middle Chinese was first written using the logograph "戉" for an axe (a homophone), in oracle bone and bronze inscriptions of the Shang dynasty (c. 1200 BC), and later as "越". It referred to a people or chieftain to the northwest of the Shang. In the 8th century BC, a tribe on the middle Yangtze were called the Yangyue, a term later used for peoples further south. (Note: According to Ye Wenxian, as cited by Wan, the ethnonym of the Yue in northwestern China is not associated with that of the Yue in southeastern China.) Between the 7th and 4th centuries BC, 'Yue'/'Việt' referred to the State of Yue in the lower Yangtze basin and its people. From the 3rd century BC, the term was used for the non-Chinese populations of southern China and northern Vietnam, with particular ethnic groups called Minyue, Ouyue, Luoyue (Vietnamese: Lạc Việt), etc., collectively called the Baiyue (Bách Việt, Chinese: 百越; pinyin: Bǎiyuè; Cantonese Yale: Baak Yuet; Vietnamese: Bách Việt; lit. 'Hundred Yue/Viet'). The term 'Baiyue'/'Bách Việt' first appeared in the book Lüshi Chunqiu compiled around 239 BC. By the 17th and 18th centuries AD, educated Vietnamese apparently referred to themselves as người Việt (Viet people) or người Nam (southern people).

The form Việt Nam ( 越南) is first recorded in the 16th-century oracular poem Sấm Trạng Trình. The name has also been found on 12 steles carved in the 16th and 17th centuries, including one at Bao Lam Pagoda in Hải Phòng that dates to 1558. In 1802, Nguyễn Phúc Ánh, who became Emperor Gia Long, established the Nguyễn dynasty. Gia Long asked the Jiaqing Emperor of the Qing dynasty to confer on him the title 'King of Nam Việt / Nanyue' (南越 in Chinese character) after seizing power in Annam. Emperor Jiaqing refused because the name was related to Zhao Tuo's Nanyue, which included the regions of Guangxi and Guangdong in southern China, so he decided to call the area "Việt Nam" instead, meaning per Classical Chinese word order "land to the south of the Viet land" (Vietnamese: vùng đất phía Nam đất Việt). The Vietnamese just understood "Việt Nam" as either, also per Classical Chinese word-order, "Viet people's Southern country" (Vietnamese: nước Nam của người Việt) or per Vietnamese word order, "Viet of the South". Between 1804-13, the name Vietnam was used officially by Emperor Gia Long. It was revived in the 20th century in Phan Bội Châu's History of the Loss of Vietnam, and by the Vietnamese Nationalist Party (VNQDĐ). The country was sometimes called Annam and its people Annamites until 1945, when the imperial government in Huế adopted Việt Nam.

== History ==
=== Prehistory ===
Archaeological excavations have revealed the existence of humans in what later is Vietnam as early as the Paleolithic age. Stone artefacts excavated in Gia Lai province have been claimed to date to 780,000 years ago, based on associated find of tektites, this claim has been challenged because tektites are often found in archaeological sites of various ages in Vietnam. Homo erectus fossils dating to around 500,000 BC have been found in caves in Lạng Sơn and Nghệ An provinces in northern Vietnam. The oldest Homo sapiens fossils from Mainland Southeast Asia are of Middle Pleistocene provenance, and include isolated tooth fragments from Tham Om and Hang Hum. Teeth attributed to Homo sapiens from the Late Pleistocene have been found at Dong Can, and from the Early Holocene at Mai Da Dieu, Lang Gao and Lang Cuom. Areas comprising what later is Vietnam participated in the Maritime Jade Road, as ascertained by archaeological research.

By about 1,000 BC, the development of wet-rice cultivation in the Ma River and Red River floodplains led to the flourishing of Đông Sơn culture, known for its bronze casting used to make bronze Đông Sơn drums. This culture spread to the rest of Southeast Asia, including Maritime Southeast Asia, throughout the first millennium BC.

=== Dynasties ===
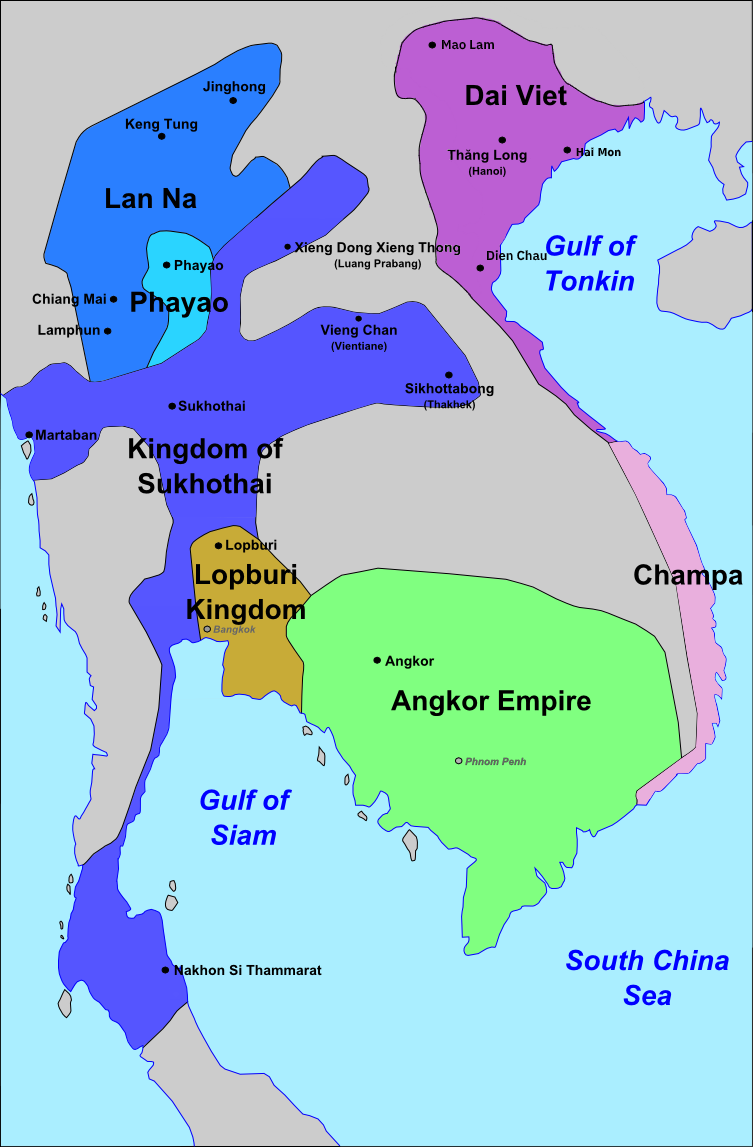
Đại Việt, Champa, Angkor Empire and their neighbours, 13th century

Vietnam's territories around 1838, during the Vietnamese occupation of Cambodia

In 179 BC, a Chinese general named Zhao Tuo (Triệu Đà) consolidated the region into Nanyue. Nanyue was itself incorporated into the empire of the Chinese Han dynasty in 111 BC after the Han–Nanyue War. Through Han rule, Confucianism was introduced into the region and came to influence Vietnamese societal norms and governance. For the next thousand years, what later is northern Vietnam remained mostly under Chinese rule. Early independence movements, such as those of the Trưng Sisters and Lady Triệu, were temporarily successful, while the region gained a longer period of independence as Vạn Xuân under the Anterior Lý dynasty between AD 544 and 602. By the early 10th century, northern Vietnam had gained autonomy, and not sovereignty, under the Khúc family.

In AD 938, Ngô Quyền defeated the forces of the Southern Han state at Bạch Đằng River and achieved full independence for Vietnam in 939 after a millennium of Chinese domination. By the 960s, the dynastic Đại Việt (Great Viet) kingdom was established. During the rule of the Trần dynasty, Đại Việt repelled three Mongol invasions. Meanwhile, the Mahāyāna branch of Buddhism flourished and became the state religion. Following the 1406–7 Ming–Hồ War, which overthrew the Hồ dynasty, Vietnamese independence was interrupted by the Chinese Ming dynasty, and was restored by Lê Lợi, the founder of the Lê dynasty. The Vietnamese polity reached their zenith in the Lê dynasty of the 15th century, especially during the reign of emperor Lê Thánh Tông (1460–1497). Between the 11th and 18th centuries, the Vietnamese polity expanded southward in a gradual process known as Nam tiến ("Southward expansion"), eventually conquering the kingdom of Champa and part of the Khmer Kingdom.

From the 16th century onward, civil strife and political infighting engulfed Đại Việt. First, the Chinese-supported Mạc dynasty challenged the Lê dynasty's power. After the Mạc dynasty was defeated, the Lê dynasty was nominally reinstalled. Actual power was divided between the northern Trịnh lords and the southern Nguyễn lords, who engaged in a civil war for more than four decades before a truce was called in the 1670s. Vietnam was divided into North (Trịnh) and South (Nguyễn) from 1600 to 1777. During this period, the Nguyễn expanded into the Mekong Delta, annexing the Central Highlands and the Khmer lands in the Mekong Delta. The division of the country ended a century later when the Tây Sơn brothers helped Trịnh to end Nguyễn; they also established a new dynasty and ended Trịnh. Their rule lasted until they were defeated by the remnants of the Nguyễn lords, led by Nguyễn Ánh. Nguyễn Ánh unified Vietnam, and established the Nguyễn dynasty, ruling under the name Gia Long.

=== French Indochina ===
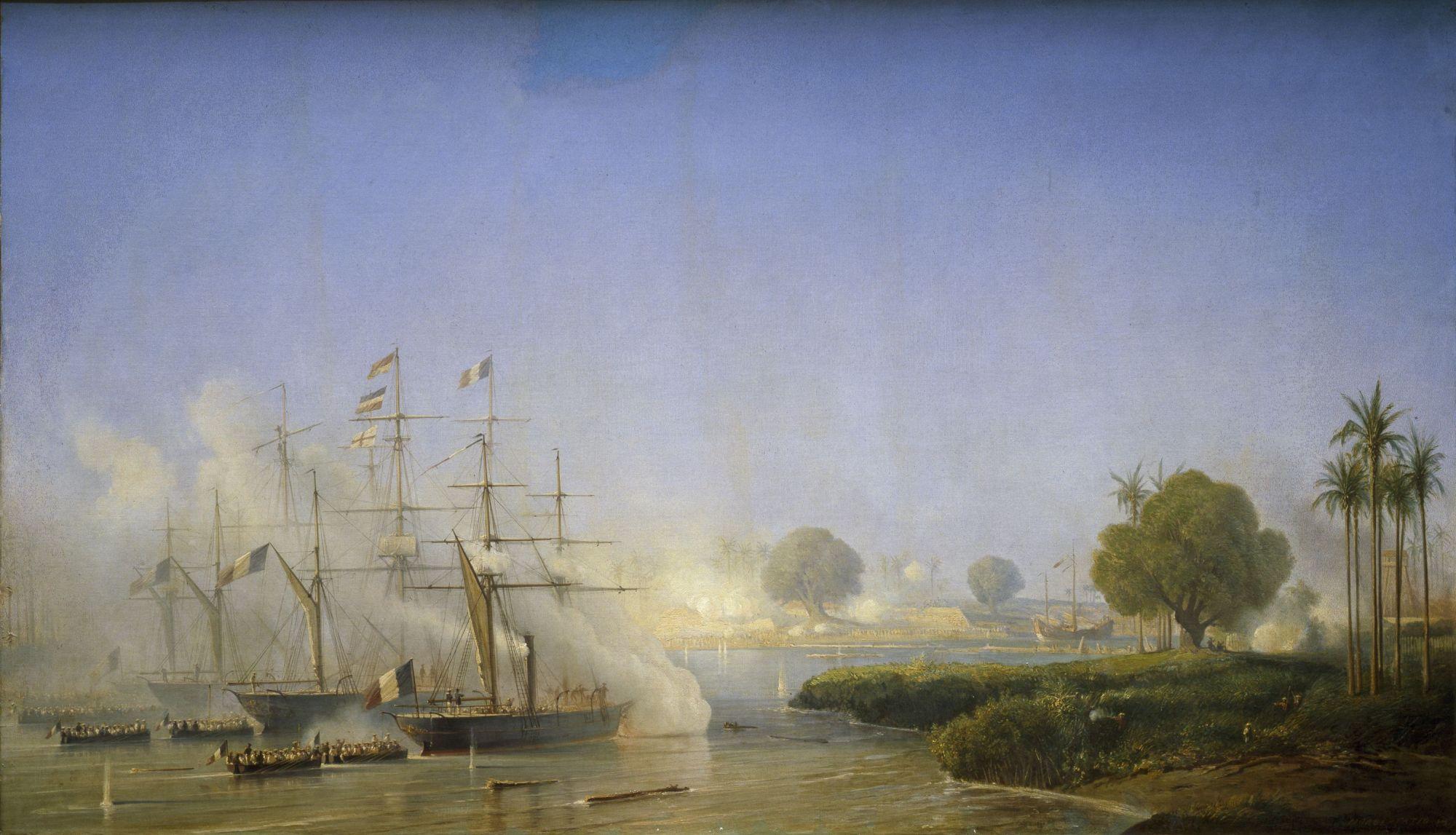
Capture of Saigon by Charles Rigault de Genouilly on 18 February 1859

The Grand Palais built for the 1902–1903 world's fair, when Hanoi became French Indochina's capital

In the 1500s, the Portuguese explored the Vietnamese coast and reportedly erected a stele on the Chàm Islands to mark their presence. By 1533, they began landing in the Vietnamese delta and were forced to leave because of local turmoil and fighting. They also had less interest in the territory than they did in China and Japan. After they had settled in Macau and Nagasaki to begin the profitable Macau–Japan trade route, the Portuguese began to involve themselves in trade with Hội An. Portuguese traders and Jesuit missionaries under the Padroado system were active in both Vietnamese realms of Đàng Trong (Cochinchina) and Đàng Ngoài (Tonkin) in the 17th century. The Dutch also attempted to establish contact with Cochinchina in 1601 and failed to sustain a presence there after violent encounters with the locals. The Dutch East India Company only managed to establish official relations with Tonkin in the spring of 1637 after leaving Dejima in Japan to establish trade for silk. Meanwhile, in 1613, the first English attempt to establish contact with Hội An failed following a violent incident involving the East India Company. By 1672, the English established relations with Tonkin and were allowed to reside in Phố Hiến.

Between 1615 and 1753, French traders also engaged in trade in Vietnam. The first French missionaries arrived in 1658, under the Portuguese Padroado. From its foundation, the Paris Foreign Missions Society under Propaganda Fide actively sent missionaries to Vietnam, entering Cochinchina in 1664 and Tonkin in 1666. Spanish Dominicans joined the Tonkin mission in 1676, and Franciscans were in Cochinchina from 1719 to 1834. Vietnamese authorities became concerned by increasing Christianisation activities, and after several Catholic missionaries were detained, the French Navy intervened in 1843 to free them. In a series of conquests from 1859 to 1885, France eroded Vietnam's sovereignty. At the siege of Tourane in 1858, France was aided by Spain (with Spanish and Filipino troops from the Philippines) and perhaps some Tonkinese Catholics. After the 1862 Treaty of Saigon, and especially after France completely conquered Lower Cochinchina in 1867, the Văn Thân movement of scholar-gentry class arose and committed violence against Catholics across central and northern Vietnam.

Between 1862 and 1867, the southern third of the country became the French colony of Cochinchina. By 1884, the entire country was under French rule, with the central and northern parts of Vietnam separated into the two protectorates of Annam and Tonkin. The three entities were formally integrated into the union of French Indochina in 1887. During this period, the French administration imposed political and cultural changes on Vietnamese society. A Western-style system of modern education introduced new humanist values. Most French settlers in Indochina were concentrated in Cochinchina, particularly in Saigon, and in Hanoi, the colony's capital.

During the early colonial period, guerrillas of the royalist Cần Vương movement rebelled against French rule and massacred around a third of Vietnam's Christian population. Anti-Catholic violence persisted in Nam Định, Quảng Trị, and Bình Định during the 1880s. The French strategy for pacification in Vietnam relied more on alliances with local notables than on Christian missions to establish control and manage resistance. The French developed a plantation economy to promote export of tobacco, indigo, tea and coffee. They largely ignored the increasing demands for civil rights and self-governance.

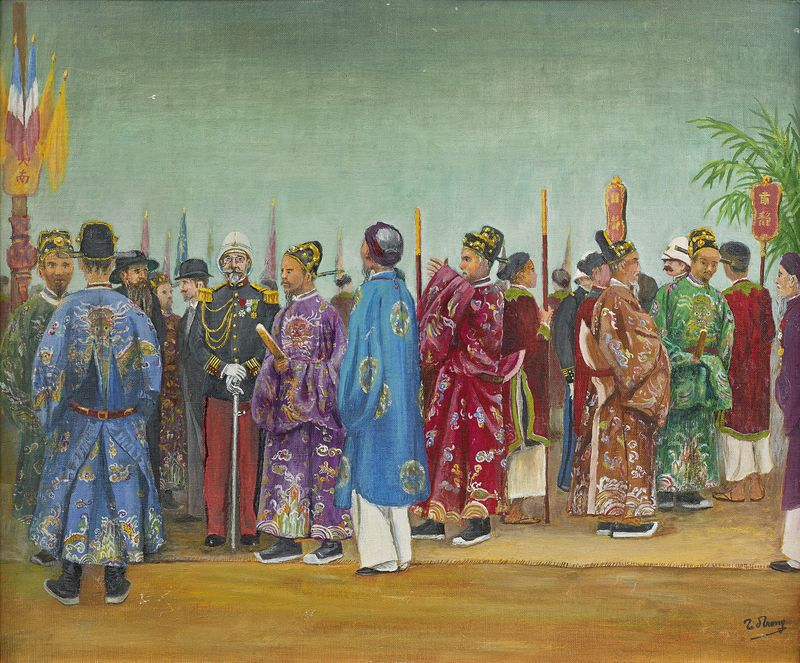
"The Mandarins and the French Authorities Awaiting the Arrival of Emperor Thành Thái", 1903 oil painting

A nationalist political movement emerged, with leaders like Phan Bội Châu, Phan Châu Trinh, Phan Đình Phùng, and Emperor Hàm Nghi fighting or calling for independence. This resulted in the 1930 Yên Bái mutiny by the Vietnamese Nationalist Party (VNQDĐ), which the French quashed. The mutiny split the independence movement, as some leading members converted to communism.

The French maintained full control of their colonies until World War II, when the war in the Pacific led to the Japanese invasion of French Indochina in 1940. Afterwards, the Japanese Empire was allowed to station its troops in Vietnam while the pro-Vichy French colonial administration continued. Japan exploited Vietnam's natural resources to support its military campaigns, culminating in a full-scale takeover of the country in March 1945. This led to the Vietnamese famine of 1944–1945, which killed up to two million people.

=== First Indochina War ===
In 1941, the Việt Minh, a communist-led national liberation movement, emerged under Ho Chi Minh's leadership. Mass political mobilization intensified during the Japanese military occupation of Indochina, and nationalist parties fostered a stronger sense of national identity. After Japan's defeat in World War II, the Việt Minh seized Hanoi and Huế in August 1945, dissolved the Empire of Vietnam, and established a provisional government that declared national independence on 2 September. In the south, Saigon's administrative services collapsed, and chaos, riots, and murder spread.

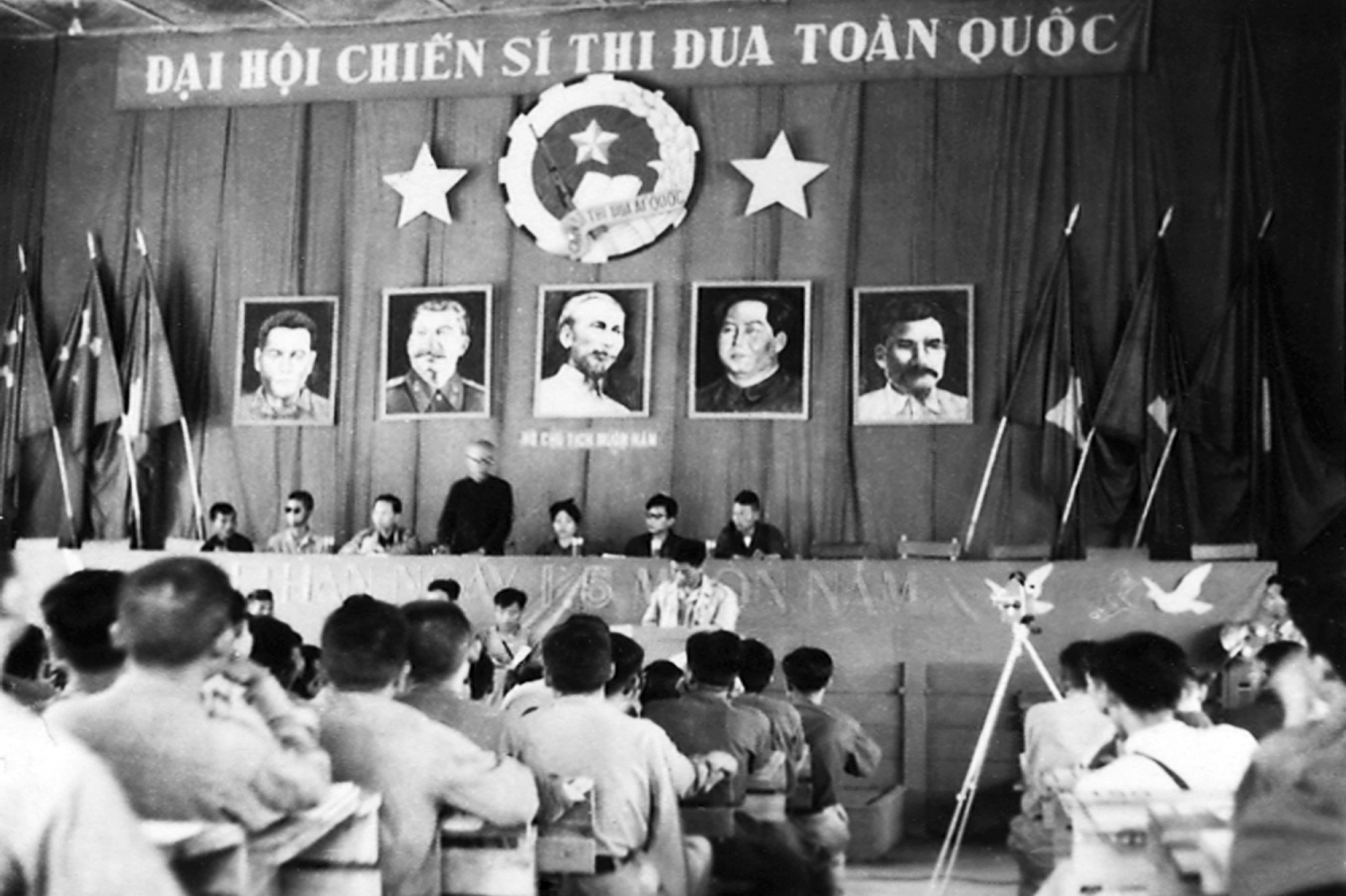
First Nationwide Congress of Emulation Fighters, Democratic Republic of Vietnam, 1952

In August 1945, the Allies had decided to divide Indochina at the 16th parallel to allow Chiang Kai-shek of the Republic of China to receive the Japanese surrender in the north while Britain's Lord Louis Mountbatten received their surrender in the south. The Allies agreed that Indochina still belonged to France. As the French were weakened by the German occupation, British-Indian forces and the remaining Japanese Southern Expeditionary Army Group were used to maintain order and help France reestablish control through the 1945–1946 War in Vietnam, south of the 16th parallel. The Viet Minh sought to consolidate power by terrorizing and purging rival Vietnamese nationalist groups and Trotskyist leaders. In 1946, the Franco-Chinese and Ho–Sainteny Agreements enabled French forces to replace the Chinese north of the 16th parallel and facilitated a coexistence between the DRV and the French that strengthened the Viet Minh while undermining the nationalists. That summer, the Viet Minh, in collaboration with French forces, eliminated rival nationalist parties. Hồ chose to take a compromising stance to avoid military conflict with France, asking the French to withdraw their colonial administrators and for French professors and engineers to help build a modern independent Vietnam. France did not act on these requests, including the idea of independence, and dispatched the French Far East Expeditionary Corps to restore colonial rule. With negotiations having broken down, tensions between the Viet Minh and French authorities erupted into the full-scale First Indochina War in December 1946. Surviving nationalist partisans and politico-religious groups rallied behind the exiled Bảo Đại to reopen negotiations with France, ultimately signing the Élysée Accords and establishing the State of Vietnam in opposition to communist domination. The defeat of French Union forces in the 1954 Battle of Điện Biên Phủ allowed Hồ to negotiate a ceasefire from a favourable position at the subsequent Geneva Conference.

Former French Indochina after the 1954 Geneva Conference, with Vietnam partitioned along the 17th parallel.

The Geneva Accords of 21 July 1954, signed between the Viet Minh and the French, ended the colonial fighting and affirmed Vietnam's independence, while placing Vietnam under a temporary North–South division along the Demilitarized Zone, roughly following the 17th parallel north (pending elections scheduled for July 1956). (Note: Neither the American government nor Ngô Đình Diệm's State of Vietnam signed anything at the 1954 Geneva Conference. The State of Vietnam's delegation strenuously objected to any division of Vietnam; however, the French accepted the Việt Minh proposal that Vietnam be united by elections under the supervision of "local commissions". The United States, with the support of the State of Vietnam and the United Kingdom, countered with the "American Plan", which provided for United Nations-supervised unification elections. The plan, however, was rejected by Soviet and other communist delegations.) 300 days of free movement were permitted, during which almost a million northerners, including at least 500,000 Catholics and approximately 200,000 Buddhists, moved south, fearing persecution by the communists. This migration was aided by the United States navy through Operation Passage to Freedom. The partition of Vietnam by the Geneva Accords was not intended to be permanent, and stipulated that Vietnam would be reunited after the elections. In July 1955, the State of Vietnam's prime minister Ngô Đình Diệm announced in a broadcast that South Vietnam would not participate in the elections, as they had not signed the accords and therefore were not bound by them. In October 1955, Ngô Đình Diệm toppled Bảo Đại in a fraudulent referendum organised by his brother Ngô Đình Nhu, and proclaimed himself president of the Republic of Vietnam.

=== Vietnam War ===
From 1953 to 1956, the North Vietnamese government instituted agrarian reforms including "rent reduction" and "land reform", which resulted in political repression. This included 13,500 to as many as 100,000 executions. In the South, Diệm countered North Vietnamese subversion (including the assassination of over 450 South Vietnamese officials in 1956) by detaining tens of thousands of suspected communists in "political reeducation centres". This programme incarcerated some non-communists, and was successful at curtailing communist activity in the country. The North Vietnamese government claimed that 2,148 people were killed in the process by November 1957. The pro-Hanoi Viet Cong began a guerrilla campaign in South Vietnam in the 1950s to overthrow Diệm's government. From 1960, the Soviet Union and North Vietnam signed treaties providing for further Soviet military support. The Republic of Vietnam in the south was supported by the United States, Australia, South Korea, and Thailand, while the Democratic Republic of Vietnam in the north was supported by the Soviet Union, People's Republic of China, Khmer Rouge, and later, Sweden.

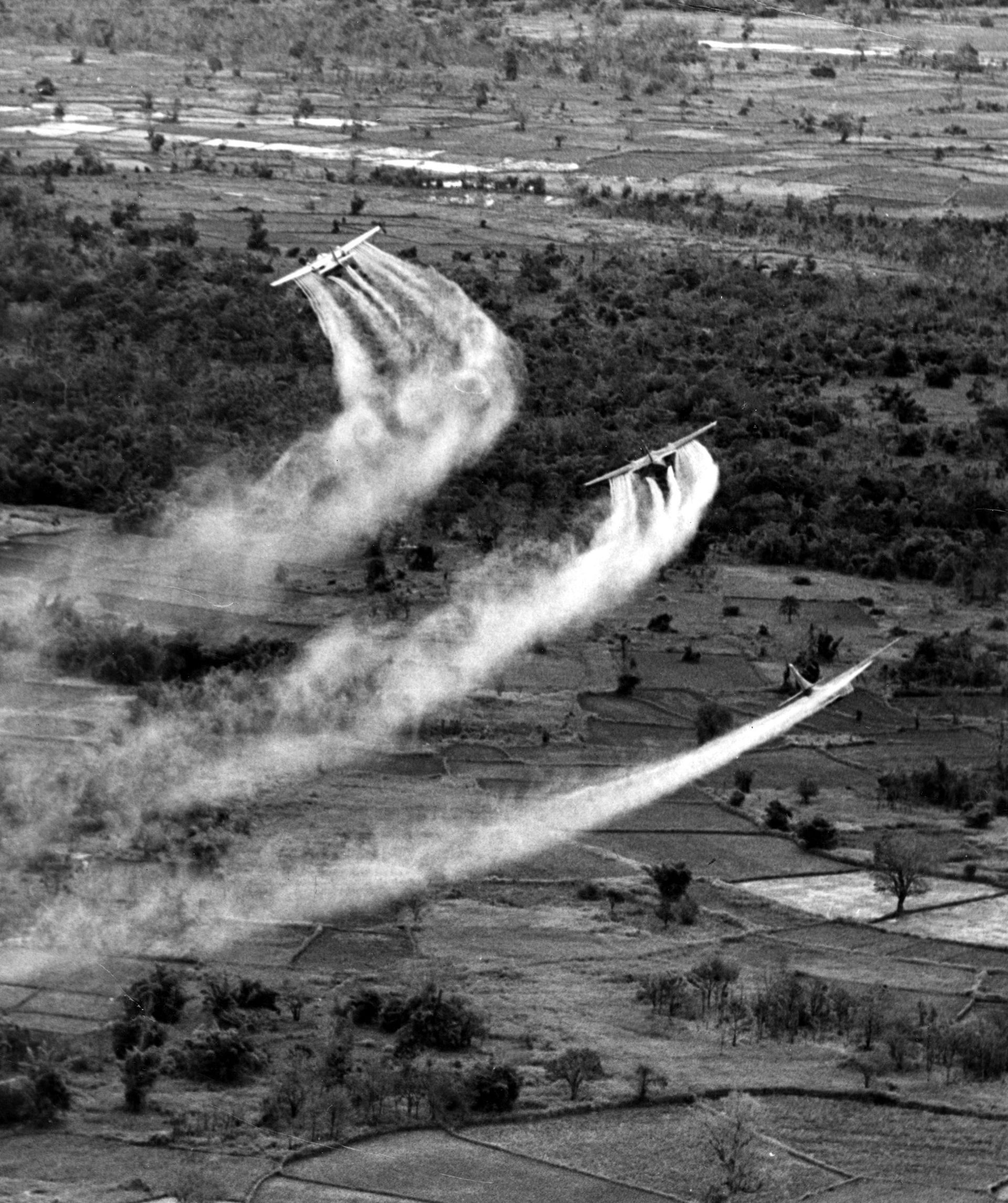
Three US Fairchild UC-123B aircraft spraying Agent Orange during the Operation Ranch Hand as part of a herbicidal warfare operation depriving the food and vegetation cover of the Việt Cộng, c. 1962–1971

In 1963, Buddhist discontent with Diệm's perceived pro-Catholic bias erupted into mass demonstrations, leading to a violent government crackdown. This led to the collapse of Diệm's relationship with the United States, and ultimately to a 1963 coup in which he and Nhu were assassinated. The Diệm era was followed by more than a dozen successive military governments, before the pairing of Air Marshal Nguyễn Cao Kỳ and General Nguyễn Văn Thiệu took control in 1965. Thiệu gradually outmaneuvered Kỳ and cemented his grip on power in fraudulent elections in 1967 and 1971. During this political instability, the communists began to gain ground. To support South Vietnam's struggle against the communist insurgency, the United States used the 1964 Gulf of Tonkin incident as a pretext for increasing its contribution of military advisers. US forces became involved in ground combat operations by 1965, and at their peak several years later, numbered more than 500,000. The US also engaged in sustained aerial bombing. Meanwhile, China and the Soviet Union provided North Vietnam with material aid and 15,000 combat advisers. Communist forces supplying the Việt Cộng carried supplies along the Ho Chi Minh trail, which passed through Laos.

The communists attacked South Vietnamese targets during the 1968 Tết Offensive. The campaign failed militarily, and shocked the American establishment and turned US public opinion against the war. During the offensive, communist troops massacred over 3,000 civilians at Huế. Facing an increasing casualty count, rising domestic opposition to the war, and growing international condemnation, the US began withdrawing from ground combat roles in the 1970s. This also entailed an unsuccessful effort to strengthen and stabilise South Vietnam. Following the Paris Peace Accords of 27 January 1973, all American combat troops were withdrawn by 29 March 1973. In December 1974, North Vietnam captured the province of Phước Long and started a full-scale offensive, culminating in the fall of Saigon on 30 April 1975. South Vietnam was ruled by a provisional government for 14 months under North Vietnamese control.

=== Socialist Republic of Vietnam ===
On 2 July 1976, North and South Vietnam were merged to form the Socialist Republic of Vietnam. Under Lê Duẩn's administration, there were no mass executions of South Vietnamese who had served the defunct South Vietnamese government, confounding Western fears, and up to 300,000 South Vietnamese were sent to reeducation camps, where some endured torture, starvation, and disease while being forced to perform hard labour. The government embarked on a mass campaign of collectivisation of farms and factories. Millions fled the country in the aftermath of the war and during the subsidy period. In 1978, in response to the Khmer Rouge government of Cambodia ordering massacres of Vietnamese residents in the border villages in the districts of An Giang and Kiên Giang, the Vietnamese military invaded Cambodia and removed them from power after occupying Phnom Penh. The intervention was a success, resulting in the establishment of a new, pro-Vietnam socialist government, the People's Republic of Kampuchea, which ruled until 1989. This worsened relations with China, which had supported the Khmer Rouge. China later launched an incursion into northern Vietnam in 1979, causing Vietnam to rely even more heavily on Soviet economic and military aid, while mistrust of the Chinese government escalated.

At the Sixth National Congress of the Communist Party of Vietnam (CPV) in December 1986, reformist politicians replaced the "old guard" government with new leadership. The reformers were led by 71-year-old Nguyễn Văn Linh, who became the party's new general secretary. He and the reformers implemented a series of market reforms known as Đổi Mới ("Renovation") that carefully managed the transition from a planned economy to a "socialist-oriented market economy". While the authority of the state remained unchallenged under Đổi Mới, the government encouraged private ownership of farms and factories, economic deregulation, and foreign investment, while maintaining control over strategic industries. While Vietnam's reforms catalysed rapid industrial and export growth, they also widened income and gender disparities.

== Geography ==
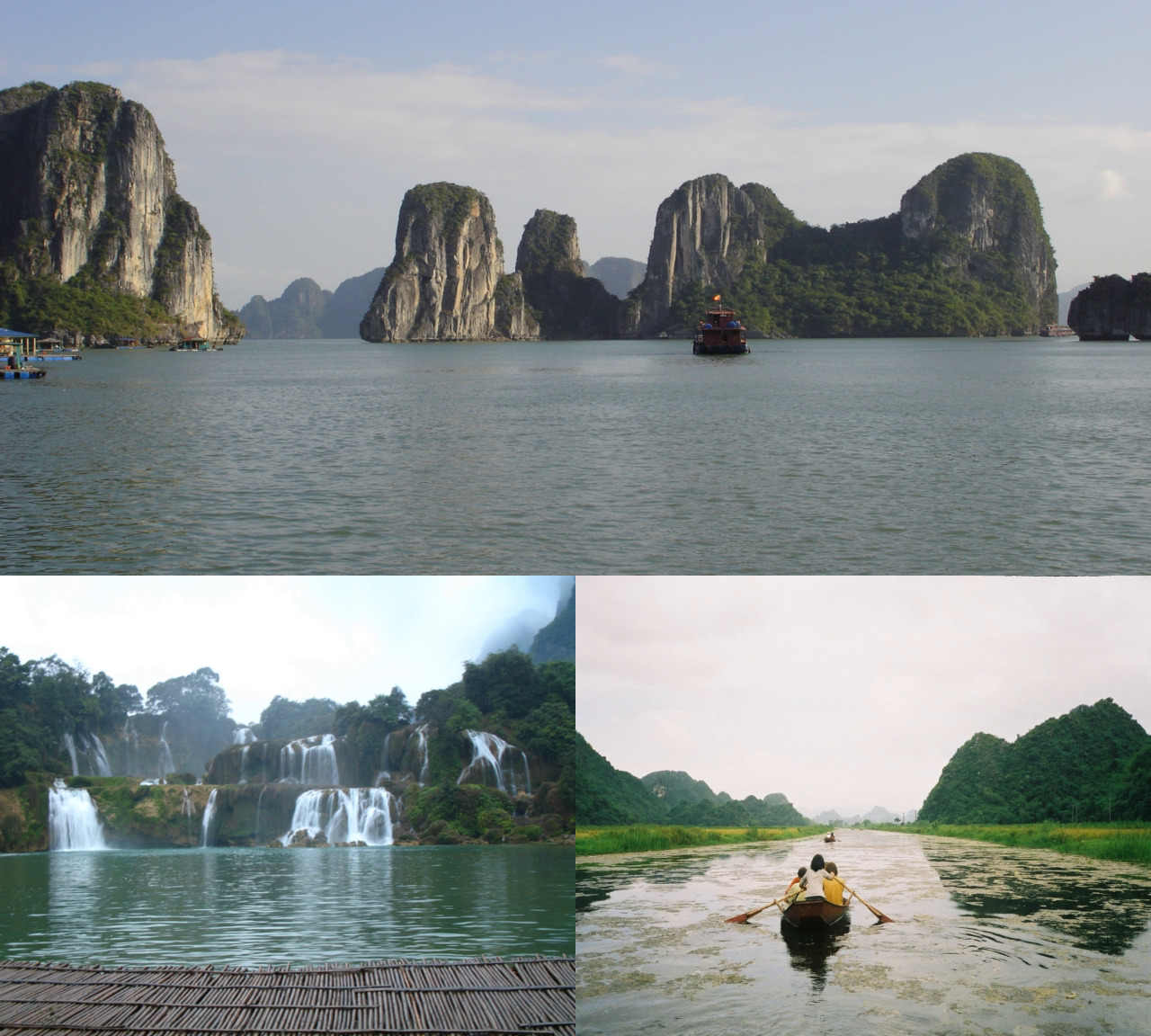
Natural attractions in Vietnam, clockwise from top: Hạ Long Bay, Yên River, and Bản-Giốc Waterfalls

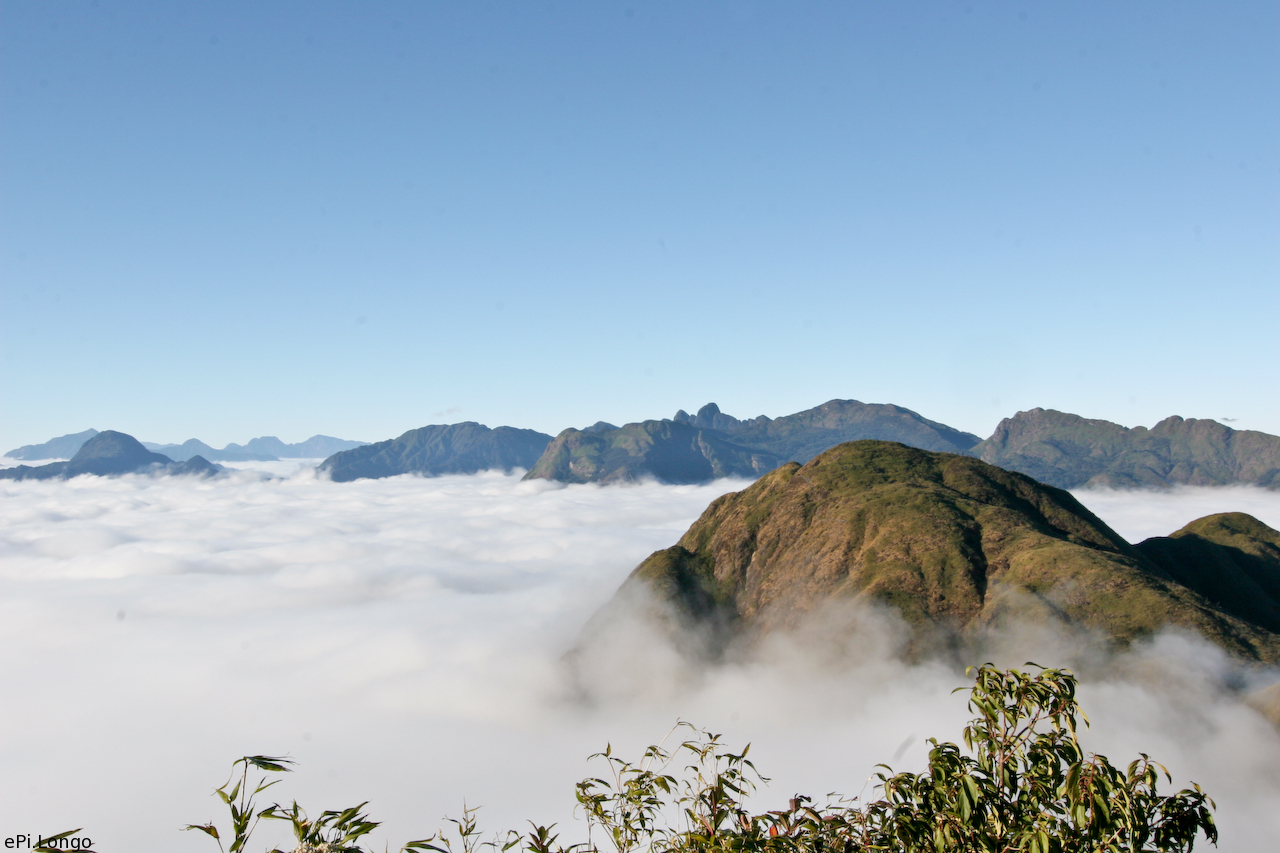
Hoàng Liên Sơn mountain range, the range that includes Fansipan, which is the highest summit on the Indochinese Peninsula

Vietnam is located on the eastern Indochinese Peninsula between the latitudes 8° and 24°N, and the longitudes 102° and 110°E. It covers a total area of 331,210 km^{2} (127,881 sq mi) or 331,699 km^{2} (128,070 sq mi). The combined length of the country's land boundaries is 4,639 km (2,883 mi), and its coastline is 3,444 km (2,140 mi) long. At its narrowest point in the central Quảng Trị province, the country is as little as 50 kilometres (31 mi) across, while it widens to around 600 kilometres (370 mi) in the north. Vietnam's land is mostly hilly and densely forested, with level land covering no more than 20%. Mountains account for 40% of the country's land area, and tropical forests cover around 42%. The Red River flows past Hanoi in Northern Vietnam before emptying into the Gulf of Tonkin. The Red River Delta is a flat, roughly triangular low-level plain covering 15,000 km^{2} (5,792 sq mi). It has the smallest area and the highest population and population density of all regions in Vietnam. It is criss-crossed by a maze of rivers and canals, which carry so much sediment that the delta advances 60 to 80 metres (196.9 to 262.5 ft) into the South China Sea every year. The exclusive economic zone of Vietnam covers 417,663 km^{2} (161,261 sq mi) in the South China Sea.

Southern Vietnam is divided into coastal lowlands, the mountains of the Annamite Range, and forests. Comprising five relatively flat plateaus of basalt soil, the highlands account for 16% of the country's arable land and 22% of its total forested land. The soil in most of the southern part of Vietnam is lower in nutrients as a result of more intense cultivation. Several earthquakes have been recorded. The northern part of the country consists mostly of highlands and the Red River Delta. Fansipan, the summit of which is located on the border between Lào Cai and Lai Châu provinces, is the highest mountain on the Indochinese Peninsula, standing 3,143 m (10,312 ft) high. From north to south Vietnam, the country has islands; Phú Quốc is the largest. Ba Bể Lake is the largest natural lake in Vietnam, and the Mekong River is the longest river in the country. Hang Sơn Đoòng, first surveyed in 2009 by an expedition from the British Cave Research Association, is among the largest caves in the world. The cave is over 8.8 km (5.5 mi) in length, and some of its caverns are large enough to hold a 40-story skyscraper. It has a sinkhole, more than 183 m (600 ft) in depth, beneath which grows a tropical rainforest containing trees nearly 30 m (98 ft) tall. This forest is home to monkeys and other animals not normally found in a subterranean environment. A subterranean river also flows within the cave.

=== Climate ===
Köppen climate classification map of Vietnam

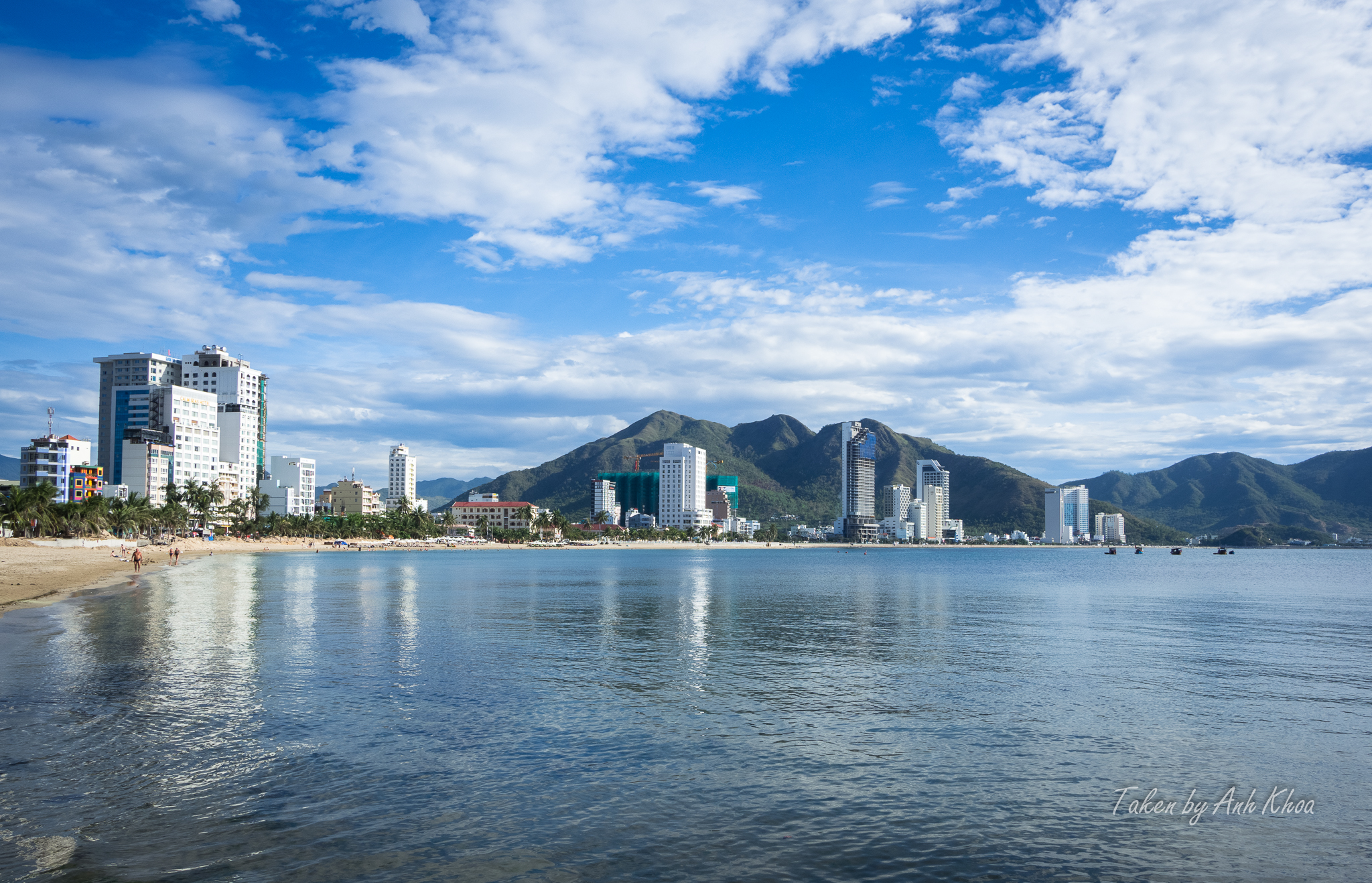
Nha Trang, a beach destination, has a tropical savanna climate

Due to differences in latitude and the variety in topographical relief, Vietnam's climate tends to vary for each region. During the winter or dry season, extending roughly from November to April, the monsoon winds usually blow from the northeast along the Chinese coast and across the Gulf of Tonkin, picking up moisture. The average annual temperature is generally higher in the plains than in the mountains, especially in southern Vietnam compared to the north. The northern region experiences a monsoonal and humid subtropical climate with four distinct seasons (spring, summer, autumn, and winter), with winters typically dry and summers ranging from hot to mild. In southern and central areas, the climate is tropical monsoon with two seasons (rainy and dry). Temperatures vary less in the southern plains around Ho Chi Minh City and the Mekong Delta, ranging from between 21 and 35 °C (70 and 95 °F) over the year. In Hanoi and the surrounding areas of the Red River Delta, the temperatures are lower between 15 and 33 °C (59 and 91 °F). Seasonal variations in the mountains, plateaus, and the northernmost areas are more dramatic, with temperatures varying from 3 °C (37 °F) in December and January to 37 °C (99 °F) in July and August. During winter, snow occasionally falls over the highest peaks of the far northern mountains near the Chinese border. Vietnam receives high rates of precipitation in the form of rainfall with an average amount from 1,500 to 2,000 mm (60 to 80 in) during the monsoon seasons; this causes flooding, especially in the cities with poorer drainage systems. The country is also affected by tropical depressions, tropical storms and typhoons.

=== Biodiversity ===
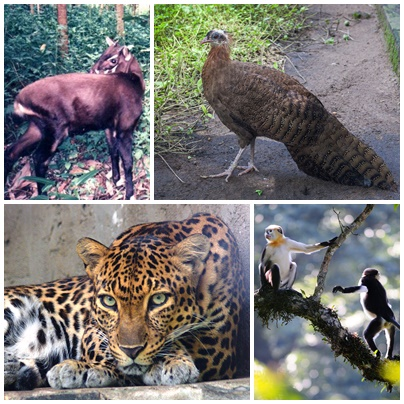
Native species in Vietnam, clockwise from top-right: crested argus, Tonkin snub-nosed monkey, Indochinese leopard, and saola

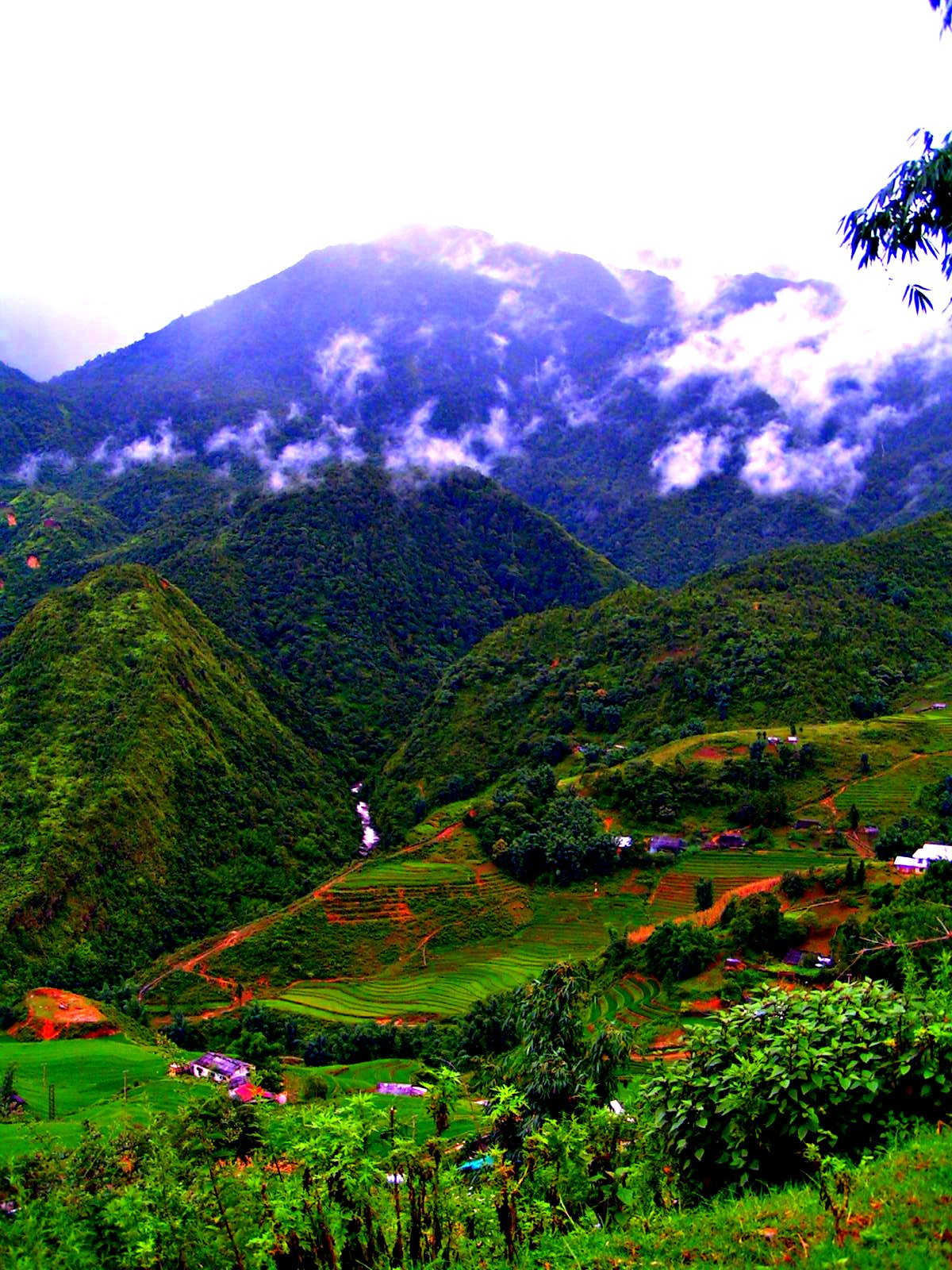
Sa Pa mountain hills with agricultural activities

As the country is located within the Indomalayan realm, Vietnam is one of twenty-five countries considered to possess a uniquely high level of biodiversity. This was noted in the country's National Environmental Condition Report in 2005. It is ranked 16th worldwide in biological diversity, being home to approximately 16% of the world's species. 15,986 species of flora have been identified in the country, of which 10% are endemic. Vietnam's fauna includes 307 nematode species, 200 oligochaeta, 145 acarina, 113 springtails, 7,750 insects, 260 reptiles, and 120 amphibians. There are 840 birds and 310 mammals found in Vietnam, of which 100 birds and 78 mammals are endemic. Vietnam has two World Natural Heritage Sites—the Hạ Long Bay and Phong Nha-Kẻ Bàng National Park—together with nine biosphere reserves, including Cần Giờ Mangrove Forest, Cát Tiên, Cát Bà, Kiên Giang, the Red River Delta, Mekong Delta, Western Nghệ An, Cà Mau, and Cu Lao Cham Marine Park.

Vietnam is also home to 1,438 species of freshwater microalgae, constituting 9.6% of all microalgae species, and 794 aquatic invertebrates and 2,458 species of sea fish. 13 genera, 222 species, and 30 taxa of flora have been newly described in Vietnam. Six new mammal species, including the saola, giant muntjac, and Tonkin snub-nosed monkey have also been discovered, along with one new bird species, the endangered Edwards's pheasant. In the 1980s, a population of Javan rhinoceros was found in Cát Tiên National Park. The last individual of the species in Vietnam was reportedly shot in 2010. In agricultural genetic diversity, Vietnam is one of the world's twelve original cultivar centres. The Vietnam National Cultivar Gene Bank preserves 12,300 cultivars of 115 species. The Vietnamese government spent US$49.07 million on the preservation of biodiversity in 2004 alone and has established 126 conservation areas, including 30 national parks.

In Vietnam, wildlife poaching has become a concern. In 2000, a non-governmental organisation (NGO), Education for Nature – Vietnam, was founded to instill in the population the importance of wildlife conservation in the country. In the years that followed, another NGO called GreenViet was formed by Vietnamese youngsters for the enforcement of wildlife protection. Through collaboration between the NGOs and local authorities, some local poaching syndicates were crippled by their leaders' arrests. A study released in 2018 revealed Vietnam is a destination for the illegal export of rhinoceros horns from South Africa due to the demand for them as a medicine and a status symbol.

An environmental concern is the legacy of the use of the chemical herbicide Agent Orange, which continues to cause birth defects and health problems in the Vietnamese population. In the southern and central areas affected most by the chemical's use during the Vietnam War, nearly 4.8 million Vietnamese people have been exposed to it and suffered from its effects. In 2012, approximately 50 years after the war, the US began a US$43 million joint clean-up project in the former chemical storage areas in Vietnam to take place in stages. Following the completion of the first phase in Đà Nẵng in 2017, the US announced its commitment to clean other sites, especially in the site of Biên Hòa. The Vietnamese government spends over VNĐ10 trillion each year ($431.1 million) for monthly allowances and the physical rehabilitation of victims of the chemicals. In 2018, the Japanese engineering group Shimizu Corporation, working with the Vietnamese military, built a plant for the treatment of soil polluted by Agent Orange. Plant construction costs were funded by the company itself. One of the long-term plans to restore southern Vietnam's damaged ecosystems is through the use of reforestation efforts. The Vietnamese government began doing this at the end of the war. It started by replanting mangrove forests in the Mekong Delta regions and in Cần Giờ outside Ho Chi Minh City, where mangroves are important to ease (though not eliminate) flood conditions during monsoon seasons. The country had a 2019 Forest Landscape Integrity Index mean score of 5.35/10, ranking it 104th globally out of 172 countries.

Apart from herbicide problems, arsenic in the ground water in the Mekong and Red River Deltas has also become a concern. Unexploded ordnances (UXO) pose dangers to humans and wildlife—another legacy from the wars. As part of the continuous campaign to demine/remove UXOs, several international bomb removal agencies from the United Kingdom, Denmark, South Korea and the US have been providing assistance. The Vietnamese government spends over VNĐ1 trillion ($44 million) annually on demining operations and additional hundreds of billions of đồng for treatment, assistance, rehabilitation, vocational training, and resettlement of the victims of UXOs.

== Politics ==
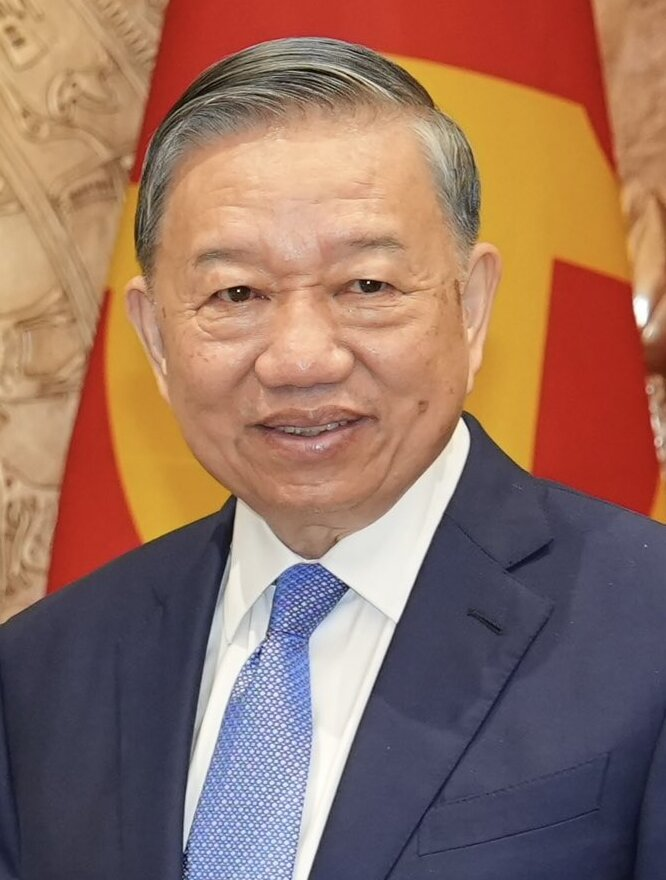
Tô Lâm
General Secretary and President

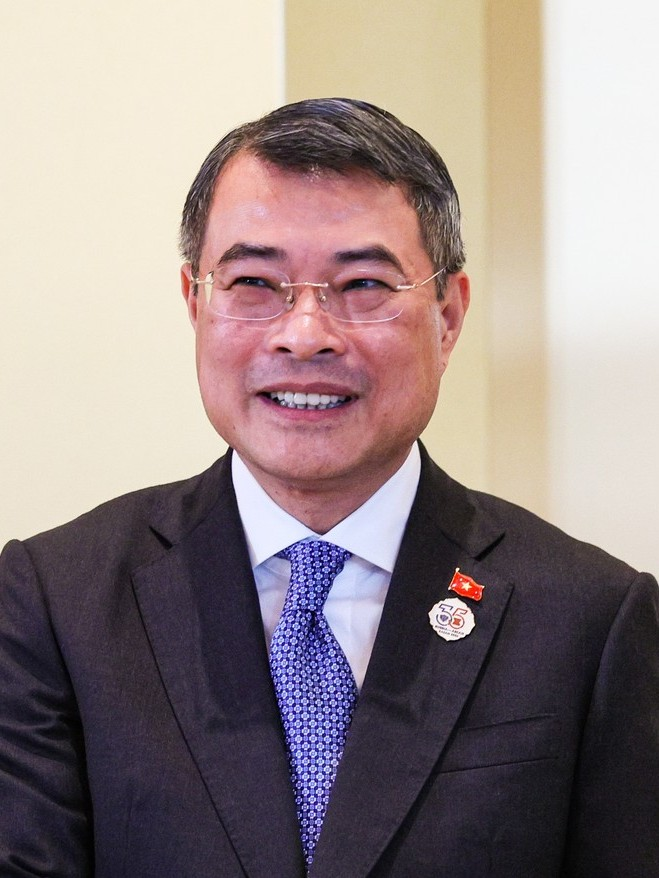
Lê Minh Hưng
Prime Minister

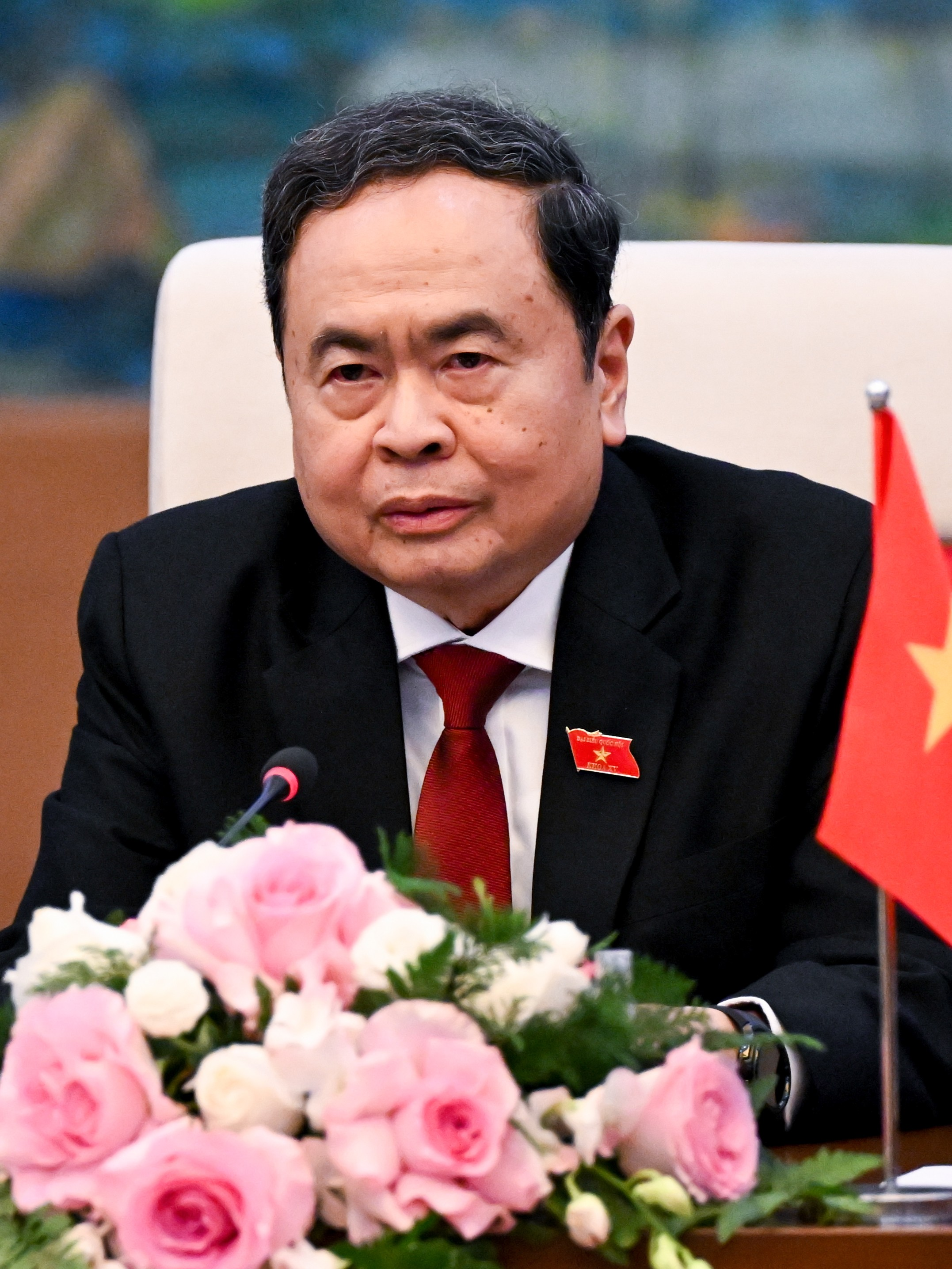
Trần Thanh Mẫn
National Assembly Chairman

Vietnam is a unitary communist state that self-designates as a socialist republic, one of the two communist states (the other being Laos) in Southeast Asia. While Vietnam remains officially committed to socialism as its defining creed, some external observers have stated its economic policies have grown increasingly capitalist, with The Economist characterising its leadership as "ardently capitalist communists". Under the constitution, the Communist Party of Vietnam (CPV) asserts their role in all sectors of the country's politics. The president is the elected head of state and the commander-in-chief of the military, serving as the chairman of the Council of Supreme Defence and Security, and holds the second highest office in Vietnam and performing executive functions and state appointments and setting policy.

The general secretary of the CPV performs administrative functions, controlling the party's national organisation. The prime minister is the head of government, presiding over a council of ministers composed of five deputy prime ministers and the heads of 26 ministries and commissions. Only political organisations affiliated with or endorsed by the CPV are permitted to contest elections in Vietnam. These include the Vietnamese Fatherland Front and worker and trade unionist parties.

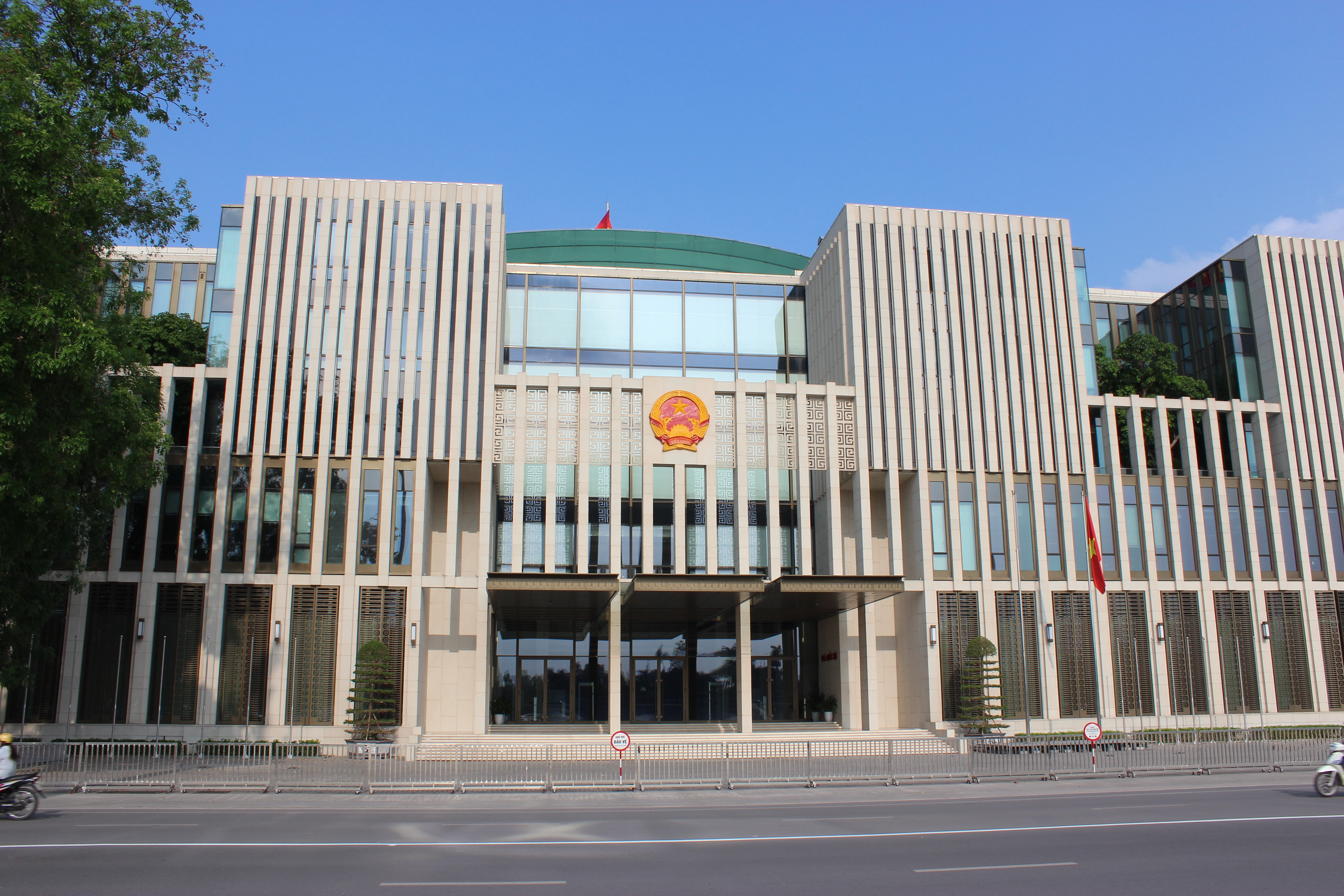
The National Assembly of Vietnam building in Hanoi

The National Assembly of Vietnam is the unicameral supreme state organ of power composed of 500 members. Headed by a chairman, it holds the unified powers of the state (meaning that it is superior to both the executive and judicial organs), with all central state officials being appointed from members of the National Assembly. The Supreme People's Court of Vietnam, headed by a chief justice, is the country's highest court of appeal, while it is also answerable to the National Assembly. Beneath the Supreme People's Court stand the provincial municipal courts and local courts. Military courts possess special jurisdiction in matters of state security.

=== Administrative divisions ===
Following the 2025 administrative reforms and subsequent administrative changes, Vietnam is divided into 25 provinces (Vietnamese: tỉnh) and 9 municipalities (Note: Marked in the table below as bolded text.) (Vietnamese: thành phố trực thuộc trung ương), which are administratively on the same level as provinces.

Red River Delta

1. Hà Nội
3. Hải Phòng
8. Quảng Ninh
9. Bắc Ninh
10. Hưng Yên
11. Ninh Bình

Northwest

12. Điện Biên
13. Lai Châu
14. Lào Cai
15. Sơn La

Northeast

16. Cao Bằng
17. Lạng Sơn
18. Tuyên Quang
19. Thái Nguyên
20. Phú Thọ

North Central

6. Huế
21. Thanh Hóa
22. Nghệ An
23. Hà Tĩnh
24. Quảng Trị

South Central

4. Đà Nẵng
25. Quảng Ngãi
26. Gia Lai
27. Đắk Lắk
28. Khánh Hòa
29. Lâm Đồng

Southeast

2. Ho Chi Minh City
7. Đồng Nai
30. Tây Ninh

Southwest

5. Cần Thơ
31. Đồng Tháp
32. An Giang
33. Vĩnh Long
34. Cà Mau

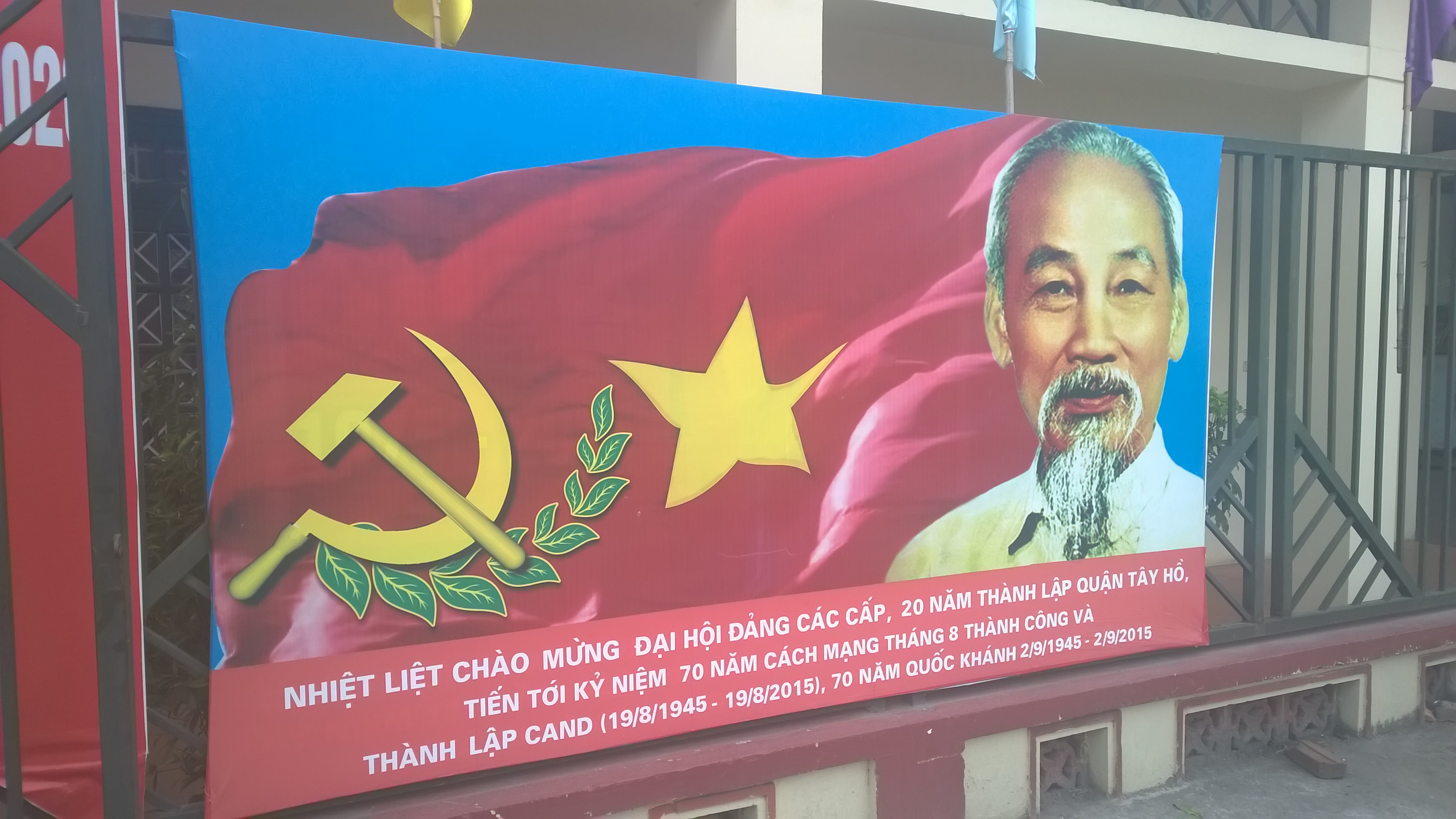
A Communist Party poster in Hanoi

=== Foreign relations ===
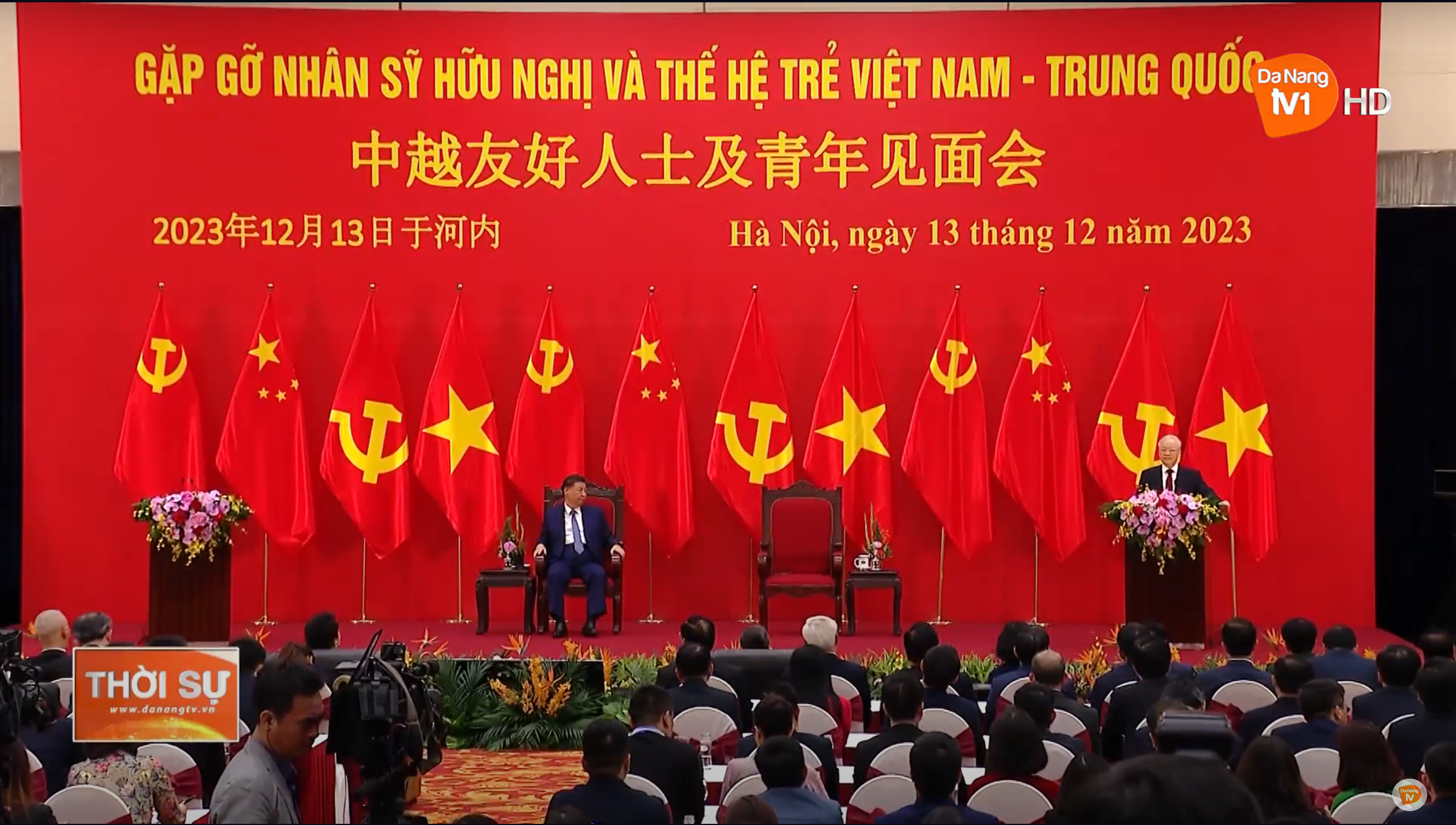
General Secretary Nguyễn Phú Trọng with Chinese President Xi Jinping on 13 December 2023

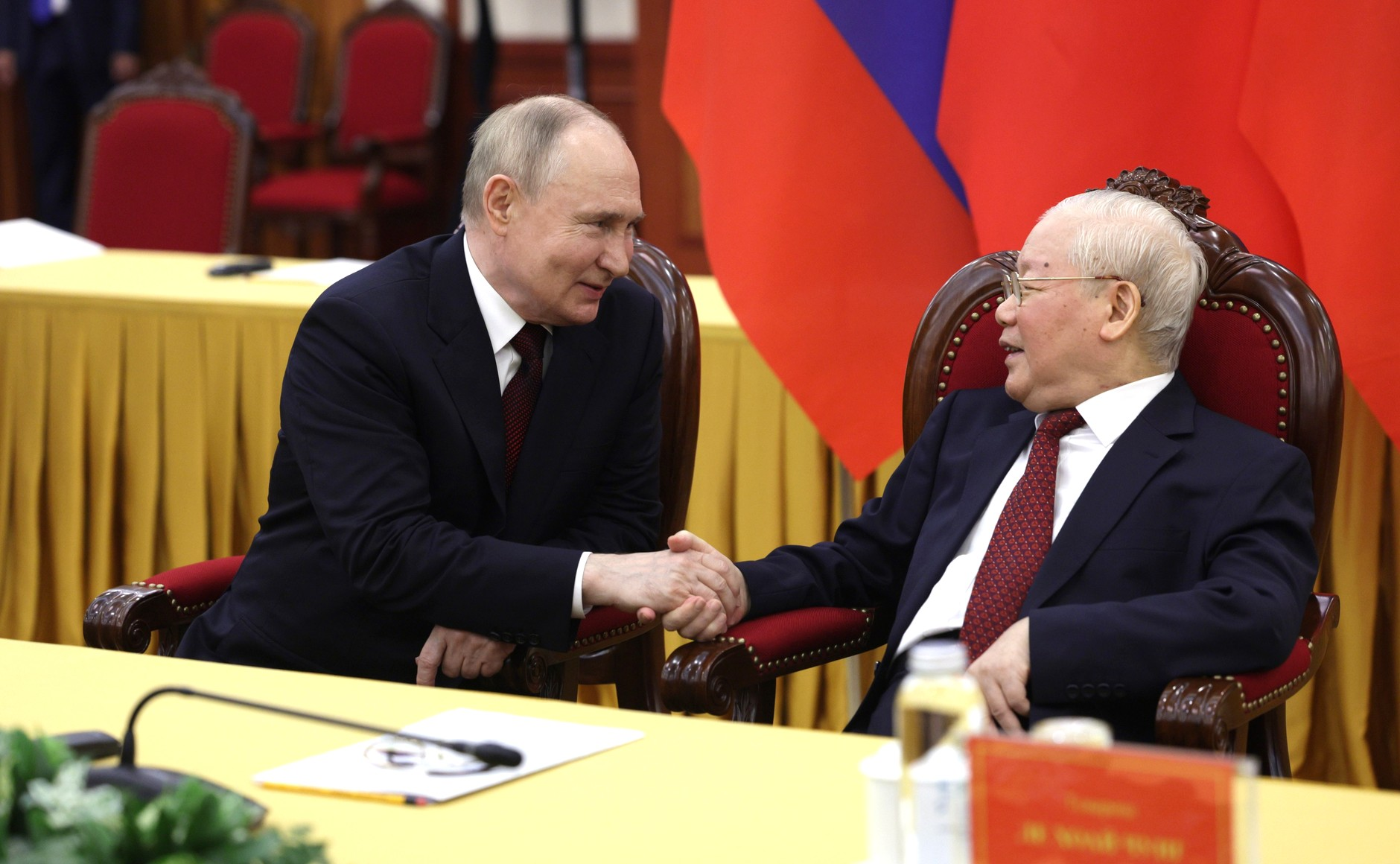
General Secretary Nguyễn Phú Trọng with Russian President Vladimir Putin on 20 June 2024

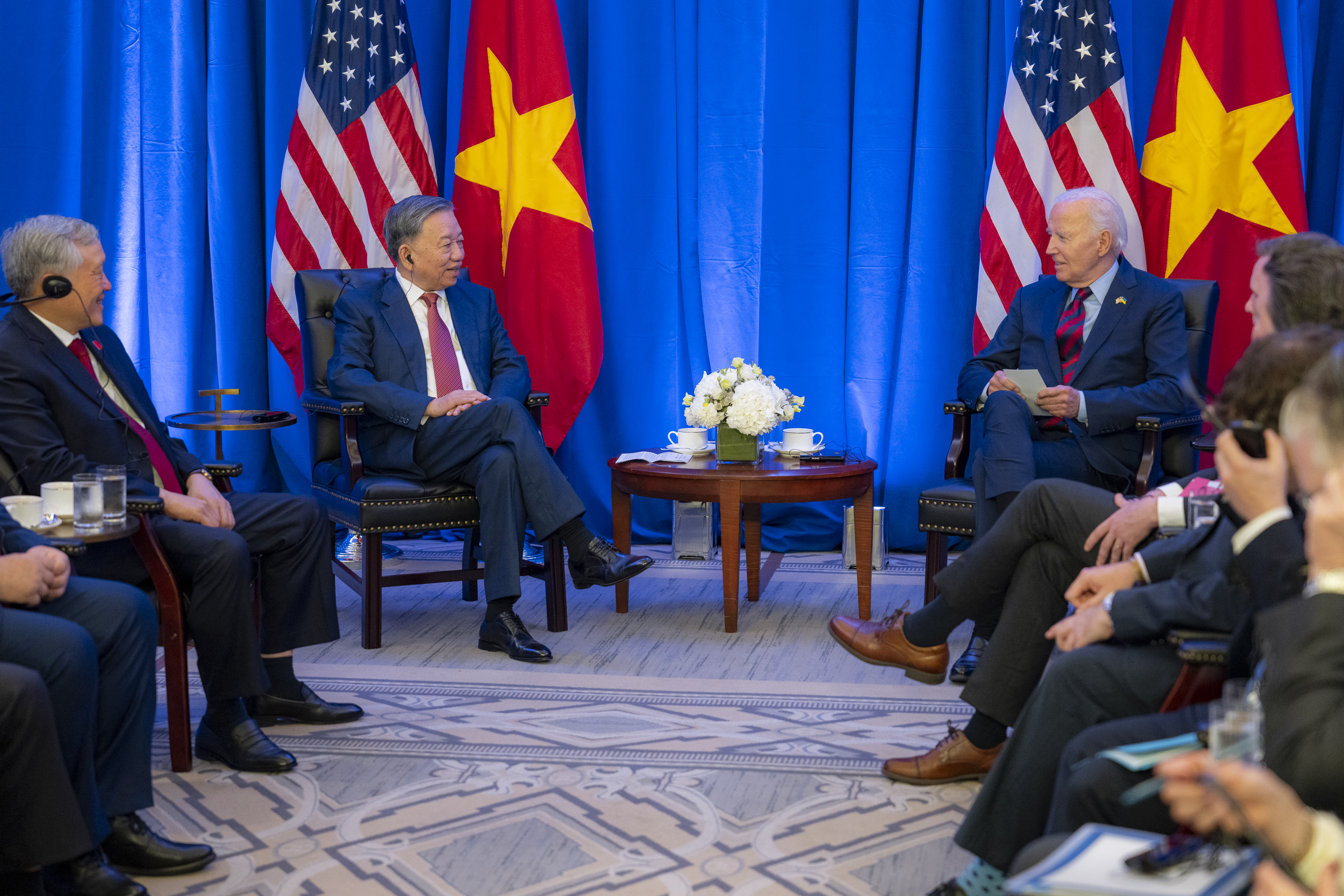
General Secretary Tô Lâm with US President Joe Biden on 25 September 2024

Throughout its history, Vietnam's main foreign relationship has been with Chinese dynasties. Its principles of sovereignty and insistence on cultural independence are reflected in historical documents such as the 11th-century poem Nam quốc sơn hà and the 1428 proclamation Bình Ngô đại cáo. Following the partition of Vietnam in 1954, North Vietnam maintained relations with the Eastern Bloc, while South Vietnam maintained relations with the Western Bloc. Vietnam holds membership in 63 international organisations, including the United Nations (UN), Association of Southeast Asian Nations (ASEAN), Non-Aligned Movement (NAM), International Organisation of the Francophonie (La Francophonie), and World Trade Organization (WTO). It also maintains relations with over 650 non-governmental organisations. As of 2010, Vietnam had established diplomatic relations with 178 countries.

Vietnam's foreign policy is to consistently implement a policy of independence, self-reliance, peace, co-operation, and development, and openness, diversification, multilateralisation with international relations. The country declares itself a friend and partner of all countries in the international community, regardless of their political affiliation, by actively taking part in international and regional cooperative development projects. Since the 1990s, Vietnam has taken several steps to restore diplomatic ties with Western countries. It already had relations with some of them in the decades prior. Relations with the United States began improving in August 1995 with both states upgrading their liaison offices to embassy status. In May 2016, US President Barack Obama further normalised relations with Vietnam by announcing the lifting of the arms embargo on lethal weapons sales. Vietnam has pursued closer ties with the US, especially in the geopolitical context of its territorial disputes with China in the South China Sea. While China and Vietnam are now formally at peace, tensions remain between the two countries over these issues. The two countries maintain extensive economic and political ties. Vietnam's foreign policy is focused on balancing its ties with both China and the United States. Vietnam also maintains military and security relations with Russia.

=== Military ===
The Vietnam People's Armed Forces consists of the Vietnam People's Army (VPA), the Vietnam People's Public Security, and the Vietnam Self-Defence Militia. The VPA is the official name for the active military services of Vietnam, and is subdivided into the Vietnam People's Ground Forces, the Vietnam People's Navy, the Vietnam People's Air Force, the Vietnam Border Guard, and the Vietnam Coast Guard. The VPA has an active manpower of around 450,000, while its total strength, including paramilitary forces, may be as high as 5,000,000. In 2015, Vietnam's military expenditure totalled approximately US$4.4 billion, equivalent to around 8% of its total government spending. Joint military exercises and war games have been held with Brunei, China, India, Japan, Laos, Russia, Singapore and the US.

=== Human rights and sociopolitical issues ===
Vietnam's pre-1986 communist system has been described either as totalitarian or not totalitarian but autocratic. Since 1986, Vietnam retreated from totalitarianism to authoritarianism. Under the constitution, the CPV is the only party allowed to rule, the operation of all other political parties being outlawed. Other human rights issues concern freedom of association, freedom of speech, freedom of religion, and freedom of the press. In 2009, Vietnamese lawyer Lê Công Định was arrested and charged with the capital crime of subversion; several of his associates were also arrested. Amnesty International described him and his arrested associates as prisoners of conscience. Vietnam has also suffered from human trafficking and related issues.

== Economy ==
Historical GDP per capita development of Vietnam

Share of world GDP (PPP)
Year	Share
1980	0.21%
1990	0.28%
2000	0.39%
2010	0.52%
2020	0.80%

Throughout the history of Vietnam, its economy has been based largely on agriculture—primarily wet rice cultivation. Bauxite, a material in the production of aluminium, is mined in central Vietnam. Since reunification, the country's economy is shaped primarily by the CPV through Five-Year Plans decided upon at the plenary sessions of the Central Committee and national congresses. The collectivisation of farms, factories, and capital goods was carried out as part of the establishment of central planning, with millions of people working for state enterprises. Under stricter state control, Vietnam's economy continued to be plagued by inefficiency, corruption in state-owned enterprises, poor quality, and underproduction. With the decline in economic aid from its main trading partner, the Soviet Union, following the erosion of the Eastern bloc in the 1980s, and the subsequent collapse of the Soviet Union, and the impacts of the post-war trade embargo imposed by the United States, Vietnam began to liberalise its trade by devaluing its exchange rate to increase exports and embarked on a policy of economic development.

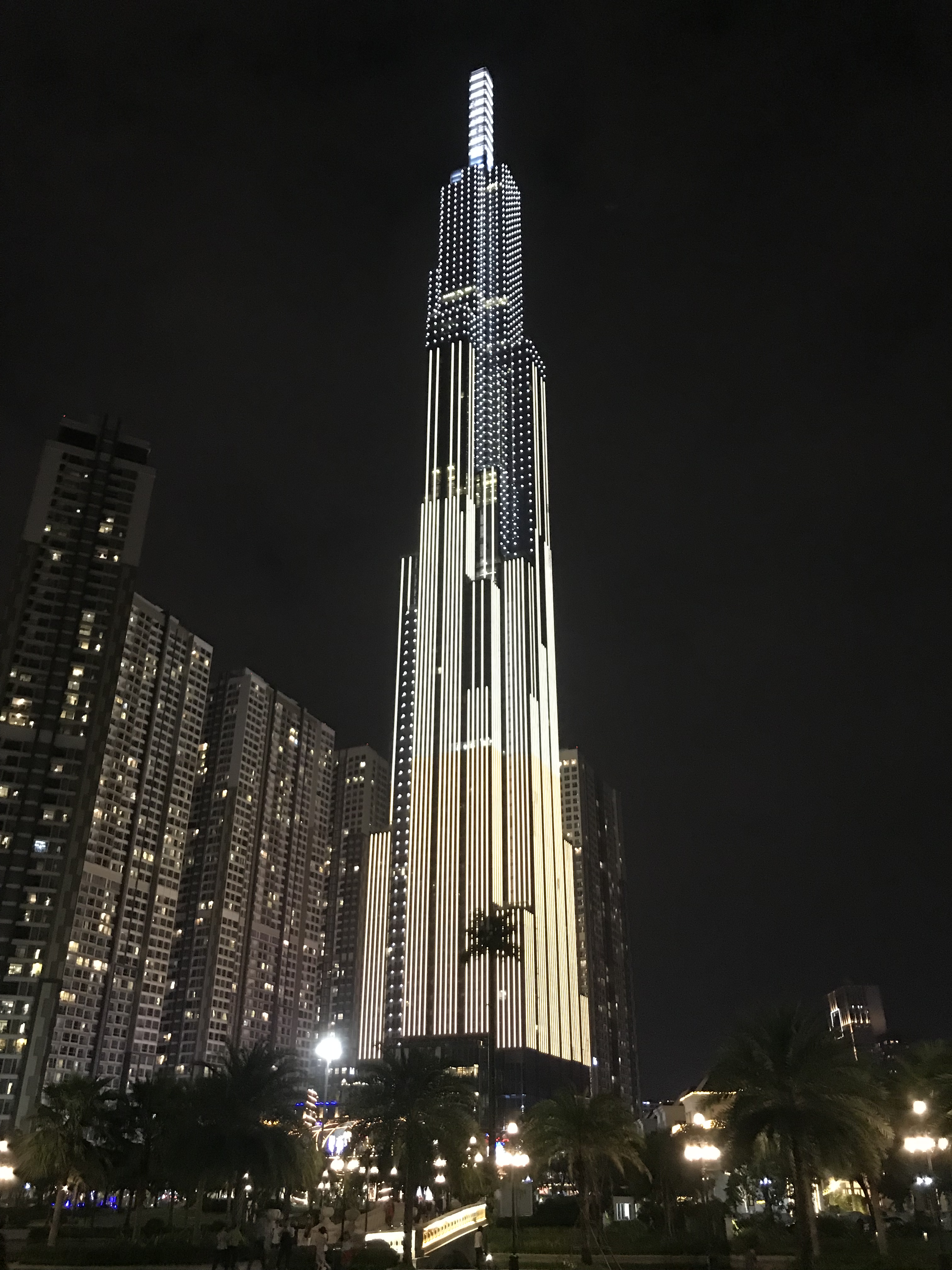
Vietnam's tallest skyscraper, the Landmark 81, located in Thạnh Mỹ Tây ward, Ho Chi Minh City.

In 1986, the Sixth National Congress of the CPV introduced socialist-oriented market economic reforms as part of the Đổi Mới reform programme. Private ownership began to be encouraged in industry, commerce, and agriculture, and state enterprises were restructured to operate under market constraints. This led to the five-year economic plans being replaced by the socialist-oriented market mechanism. As a result of these reforms, Vietnam achieved approximately 8% annual gross domestic product (GDP) growth between 1990 and 1997. The United States ended its economic embargo against Vietnam in 1994. While the 1997 Asian financial crisis caused an economic slowdown to 4–5% growth per year, its economy began to recover in 1999, and grew at around 7% per year from 2000 to 2005. On 11 January 2007, Vietnam became the 150th member of the WTO (World Trade Organization). According to the General Statistics Office of Vietnam (GSO), growth remained strong despite the late-2000s global recession, holding at 6.8% in 2010. Vietnam's year-on-year inflation rate reached 11.8% in December 2010, and the currency, the Vietnamese đồng, was devalued three times.

Deep poverty, defined as the percentage of the population living on less than $1 per day, has declined in Vietnam, and the relative poverty rate is now less than that of China, India, and the Philippines. This decline can be attributed to equitable economic policies aimed at improving living standards and preventing the rise of inequality. These policies have included egalitarian land distribution during the initial stages of the Đổi Mới programme, investment in poorer remote areas, and subsidising of education and healthcare. Since the 2000s, Vietnam has applied sequenced trade liberalisation, a two-track approach opening some sectors of the economy to international markets. Manufacturing, information technology and high-tech industries form a larger and growing part of the national economy. Vietnam is the third-largest oil producer in Southeast Asia with a total 2011 output of 318,000 barrels per day (50,600 m^{3}/d). In 2010, Vietnam was ranked as the eighth-largest crude petroleum producer in the Asia and Pacific region. The US bought the biggest share of Vietnam's exports, while goods from China were the most popular Vietnamese import.

Based on findings by the International Monetary Fund (IMF) in 2022, the unemployment rate in Vietnam was 2.3%, the nominal GDP US$406.452 billion, and a nominal GDP per capita $4,086. Besides the primary sector economy, tourism has contributed to Vietnam's economic growth with 7.94 million foreign visitors recorded in 2015.

=== Agriculture ===
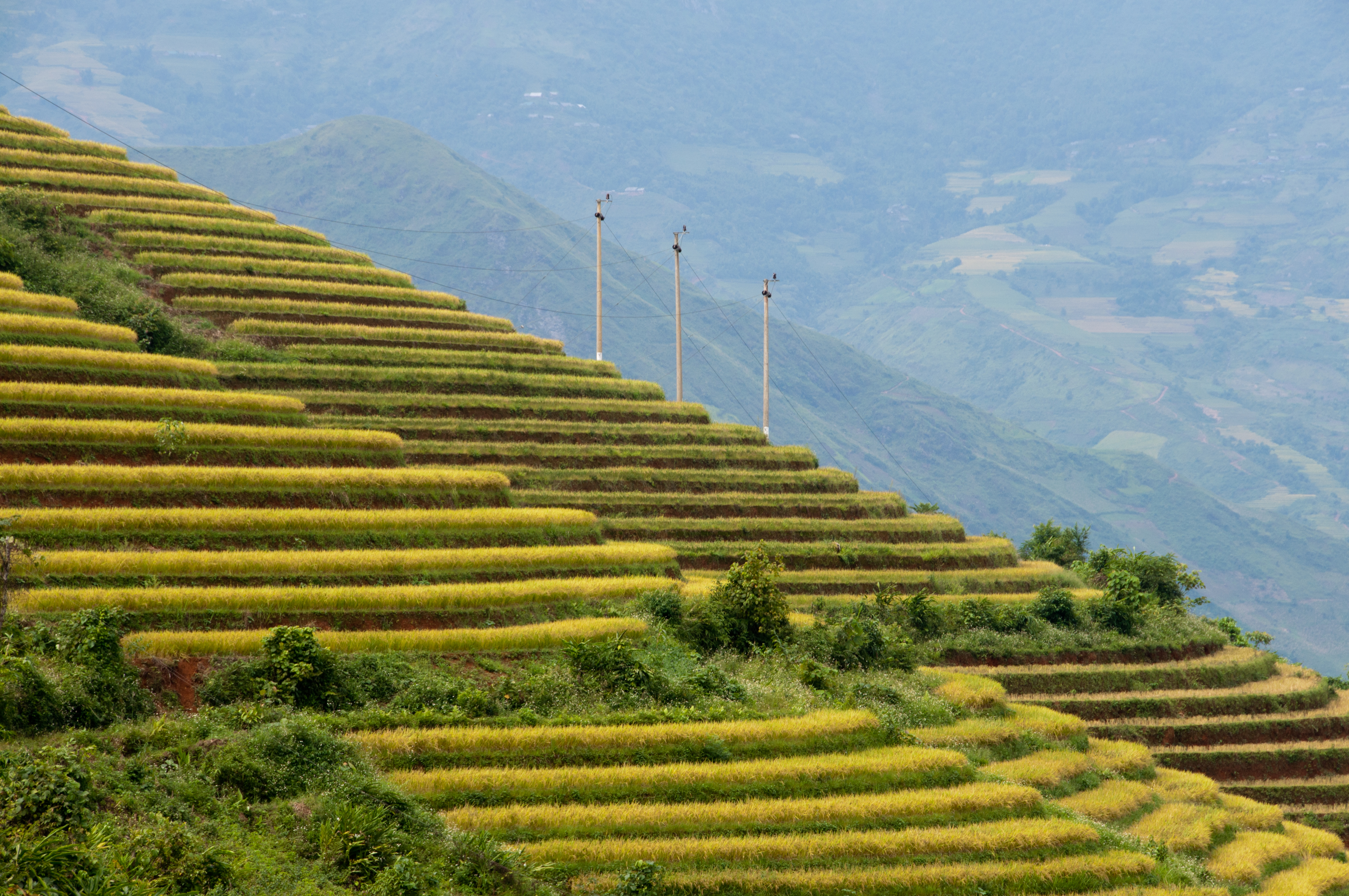
Terraced rice fields in Sa Pa

Vietnam is the world's largest producer of cashew nuts, with a one-third global share; the largest producer of black pepper, accounting for one-third of the world's market; and the second-largest rice exporter in the world after Thailand since the 1990s. Subsequently, Vietnam is also the world's second largest exporter of coffee. The country has the highest proportion of land use for permanent crops together with other states in the Greater Mekong Subregion.

The overall fisheries production of Vietnam from capture fisheries and aquaculture was 5.6 million MT in 2011 and 6.7 million MT in 2016. The output of Vietnam's fisheries sector has seen stronger growth, which could be attributed to the continued expansion of the aquaculture sub-sector.

=== Science and technology ===
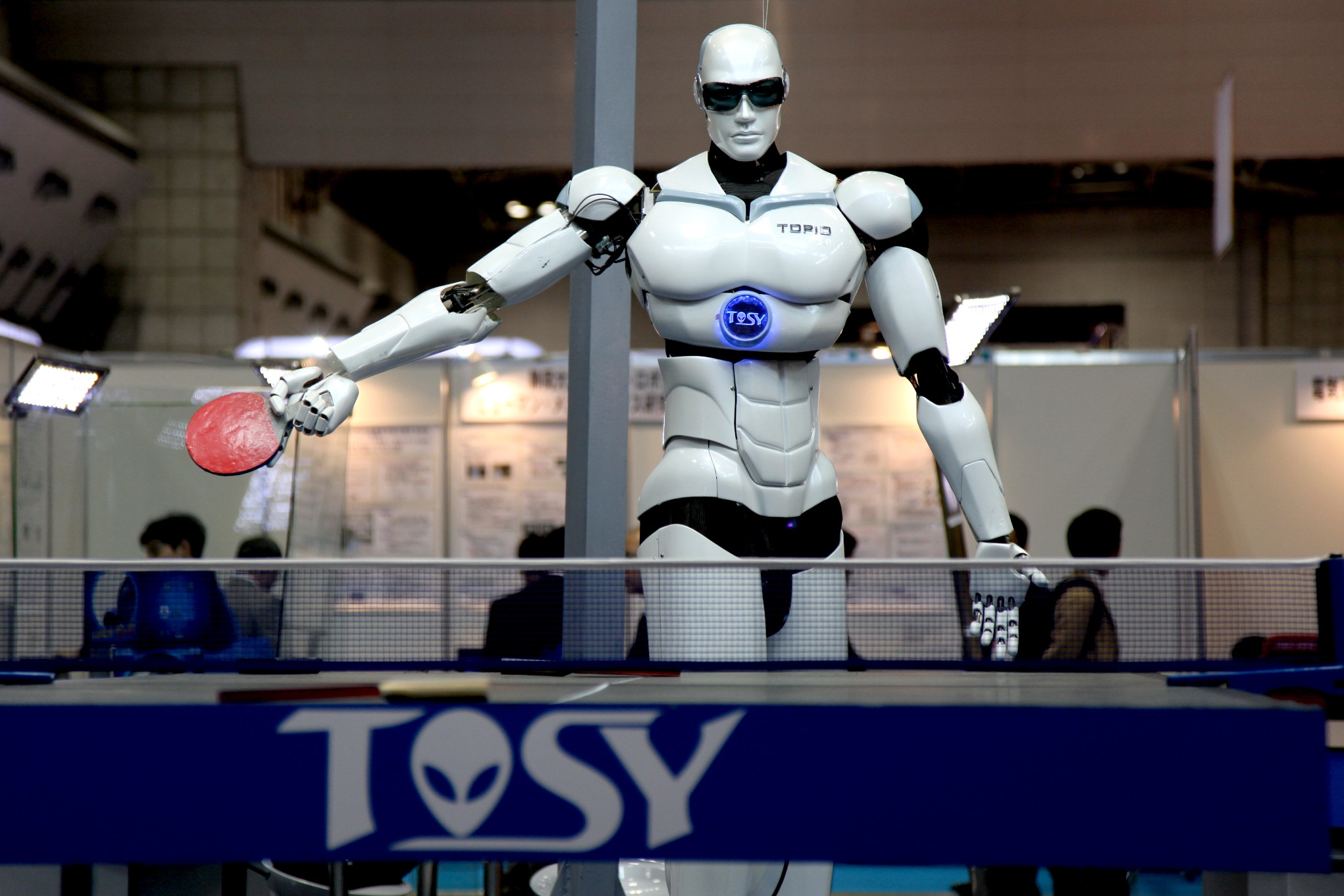
A Vietnamese-made TOPIO 3.0 humanoid ping-pong-playing robot displayed during the 2009 International Robot Exhibition (IREX) in Tokyo

In 2010, Vietnam's total state spending on science and technology amounted to roughly 0.45% of its GDP. Since the establishment of the Vietnam Academy of Science and Technology (VAST) by the government in 1975, the country is working to develop its first national space flight programme especially after the completion of the infrastructure at the Vietnam Space Centre (VSC) in 2018. Vietnam has made advances in the development of robots, such as the TOPIO humanoid model.

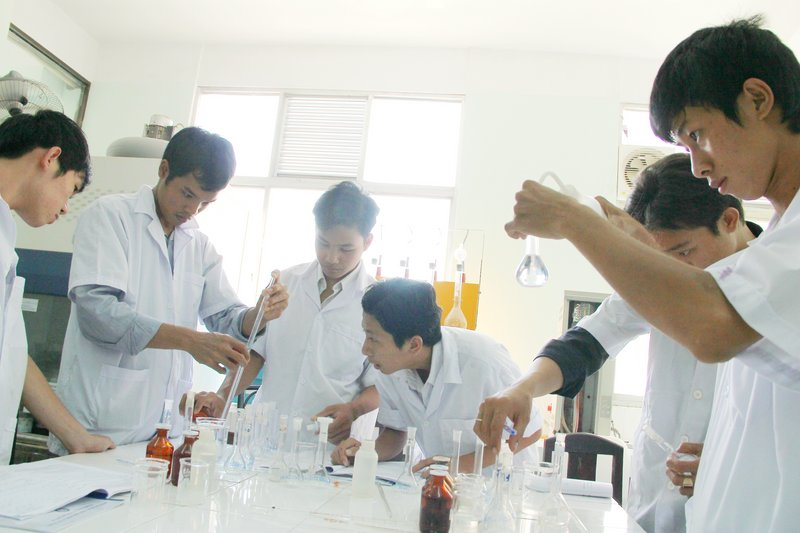
Vietnamese science students working on an experiment in their university lab

According to the UNESCO Institute for Statistics, Vietnam devoted 0.19% of its GDP to science research and development in 2011. Vietnam was ranked 44th in the Global Innovation Index in 2025. It has increased its ranking since 2012, when it was ranked 76th. Between 2005 and 2014, the number of Vietnamese scientific publications recorded in Thomson Reuters' Web of Science increased at a rate above the average for Southeast Asia. Publications focus mainly on life sciences (22%), physics (13%), and engineering (13%), which is consistent with advances in the production of diagnostic equipment and shipbuilding.

=== Tourism ===
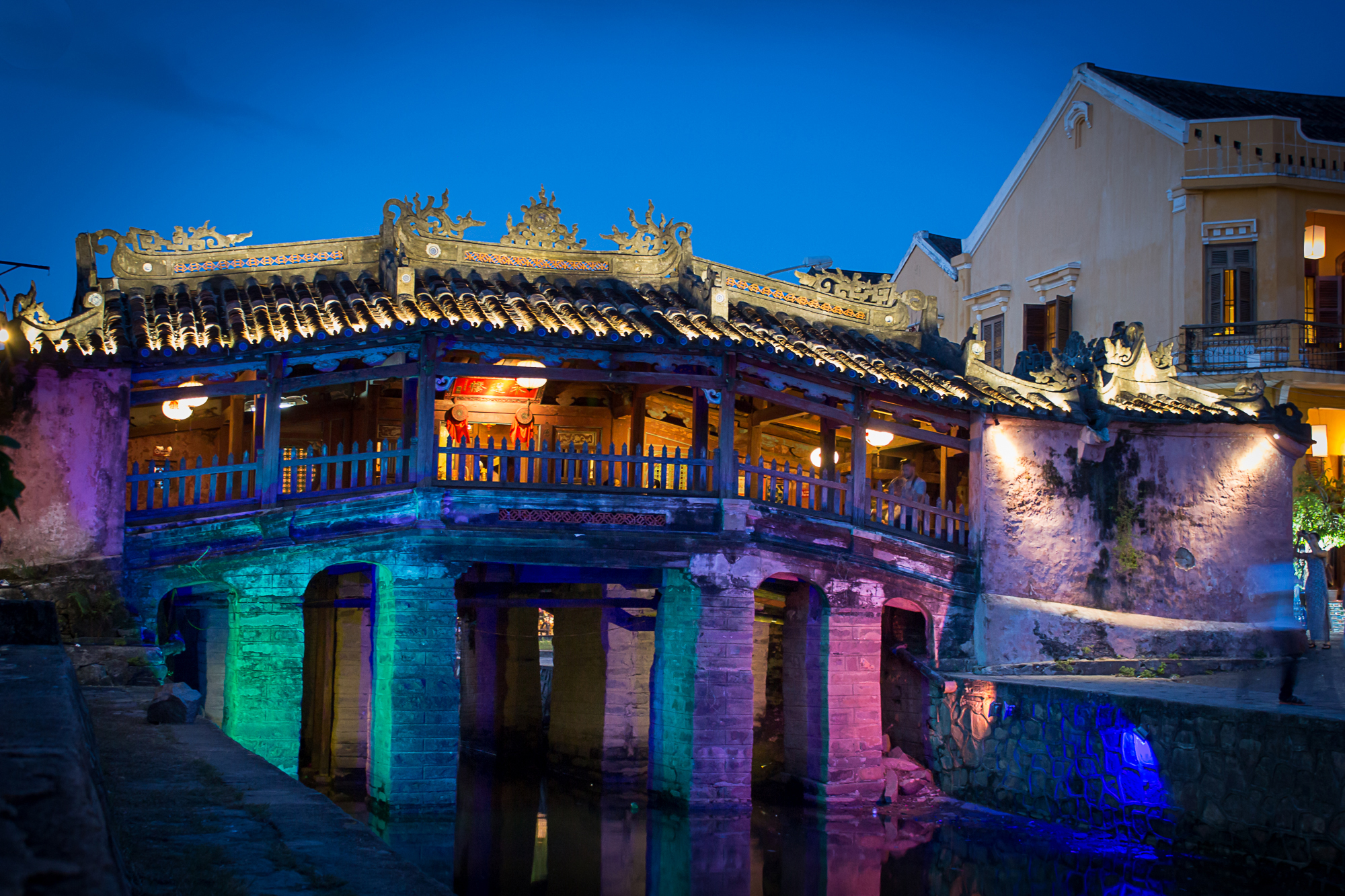
Hội An, a UNESCO World Heritage Site, is a tourist destination. The photo is Japanese Bridge.

Tourism contributes 7.5% of the total GDP of Vietnam. Vietnam hosted roughly 13 million tourists in 2017, an increase of 29.1% over the previous year. The majority of the tourists in the country, some 9.7 million, came from Asia; namely China (4 million), South Korea (2.6 million), and Japan (798,119). Vietnam also attracts visitors from Europe, with almost 1.9 million visitors in 2017; most European visitors came from Russia (574,164), followed by the United Kingdom (283,537), France (255,396), and Germany (199,872). Other international arrivals by nationality include the United States (614,117) and Australia (370,438).

The most visited destinations in Vietnam are the largest city, Ho Chi Minh City, with over 5.8 million international arrivals, followed by Hanoi with 4.6 million and Hạ Long, including Hạ Long Bay with 4.4 million arrivals. All three are ranked in the top 100 most-visited cities in the world. Vietnam is home to eight UNESCO World Heritage Sites. In 2018, Travel + Leisure ranked Hội An as one of the world's top 15 best destinations to visit.

=== Transport ===
Some of Vietnam's transportation network can trace its roots to the French colonial era, when it was used to facilitate the transportation of raw materials to its main ports. It was expanded and modernised following the partition of Vietnam. In 2010, Vietnam's road system had a total length of about 188,744 kilometres (117,280 mi) of which 93,535 kilometres (58,120 mi) are asphalt roads comprising national, provincial and district roads. The length of the national road system is about 15,370 kilometres (9,550 mi) with 15,085 kilometres (9,373 mi) of its length paved. The provincial road system has around 27,976 kilometres (17,383 mi) of paved roads, while 50,474 kilometres (31,363 mi) district roads are paved.

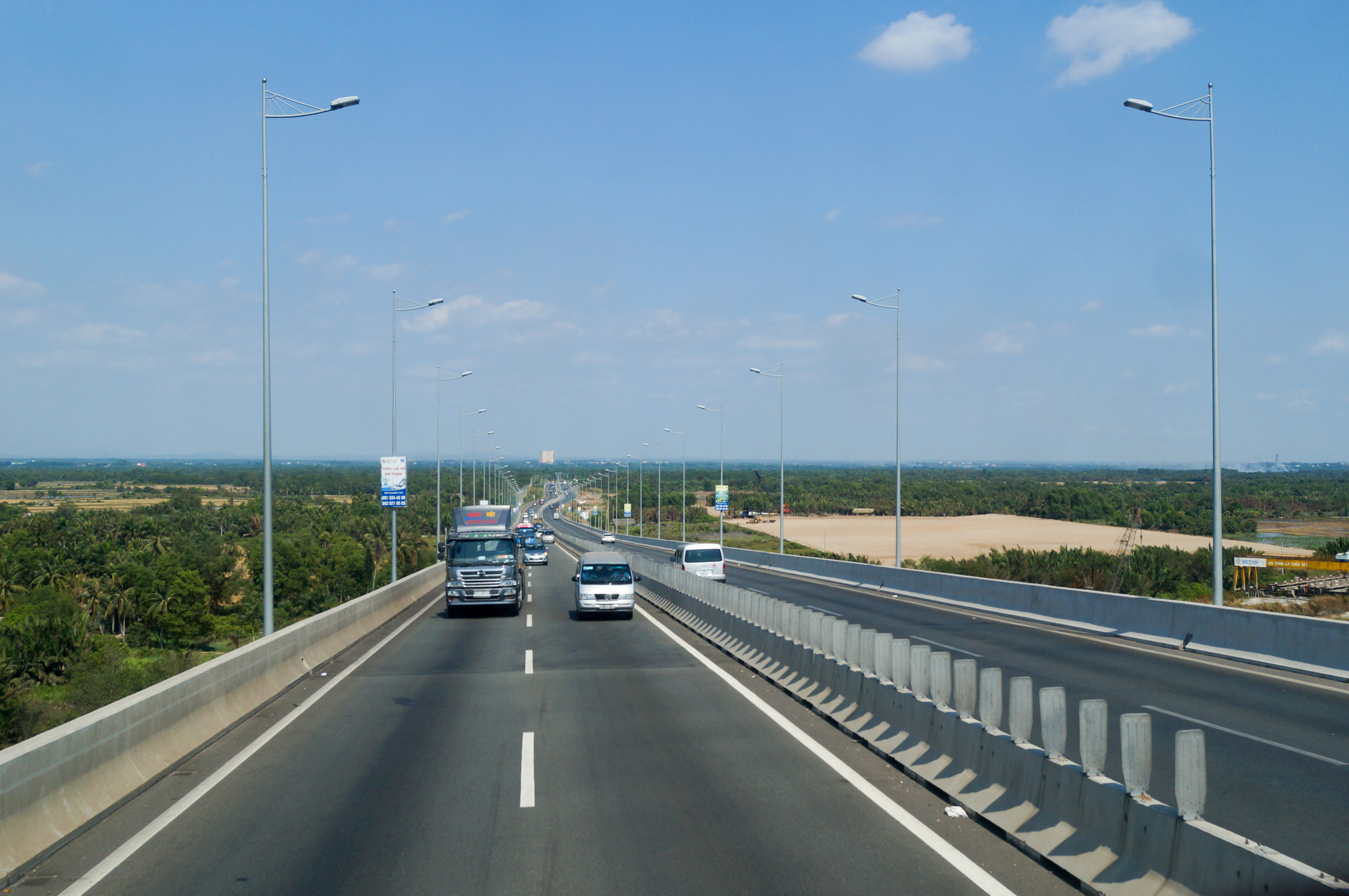
HCMC–LT–DG section of the North–South Expressway

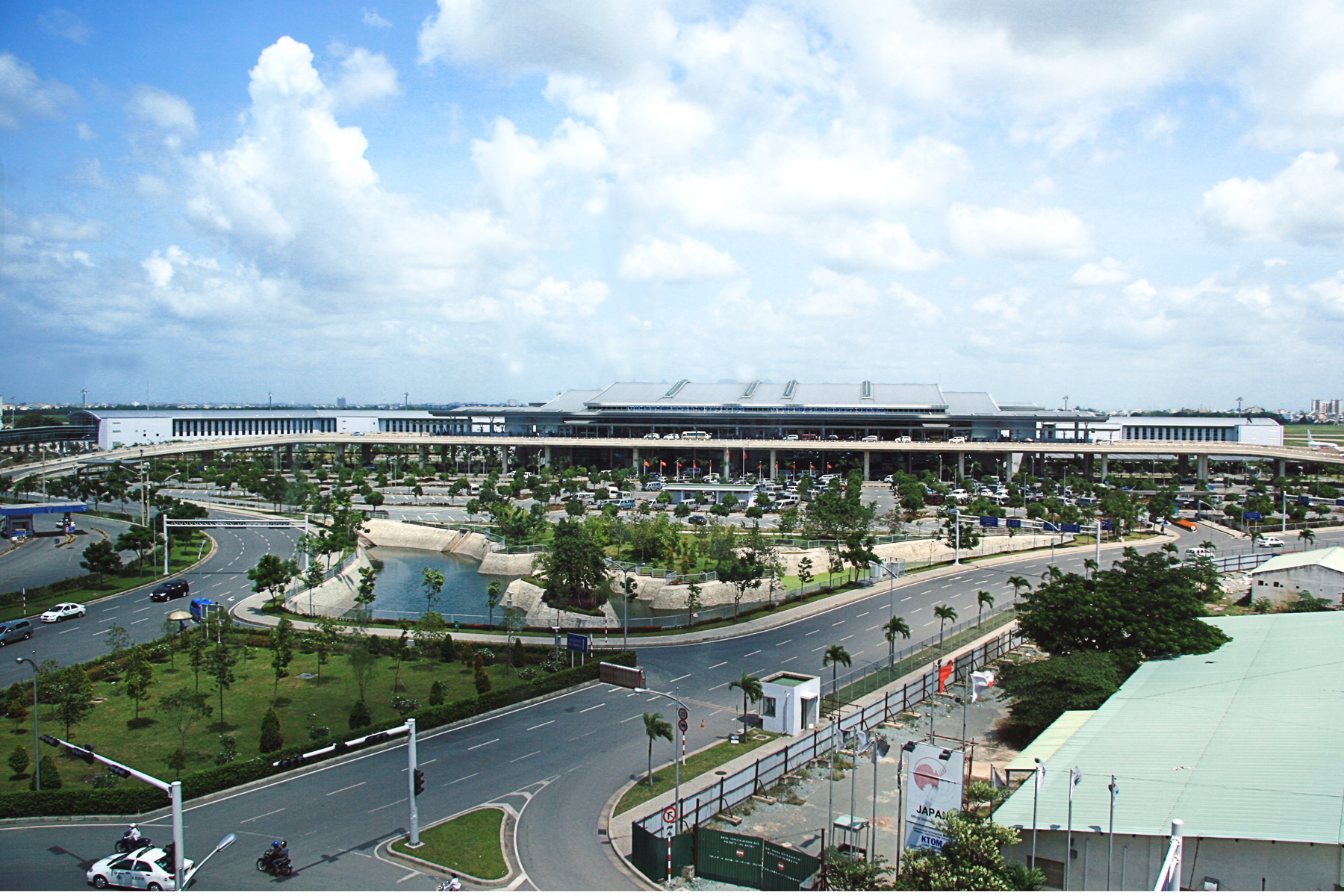
Tan Son Nhat International Airport is the busiest airport in the country.

Bicycles, motorcycles, and motor scooters remain the most popular forms of road transport in the country, a legacy of the French, while the number of privately owned cars has been increasing. Public buses operated by private companies are the main mode of long-distance travel for much of the population. Traffic collisions remain a safety issue of Vietnamese transportation, with an average of 30 people losing their lives daily. Traffic congestion is a growing problem in Hanoi and Ho Chi Minh City, especially with the growth of individual car ownership. Vietnam's primary cross-country rail service is the Reunification Express from Ho Chi Minh City to Hanoi, a distance of nearly 1,726 kilometres (1,072 mi). From Hanoi, railway lines branch out to the northeast, north, and west; the eastbound line runs from Hanoi to Hạ Long Bay, the northbound line from Hanoi to Thái Nguyên, and the northeast line from Hanoi to Lào Cai.

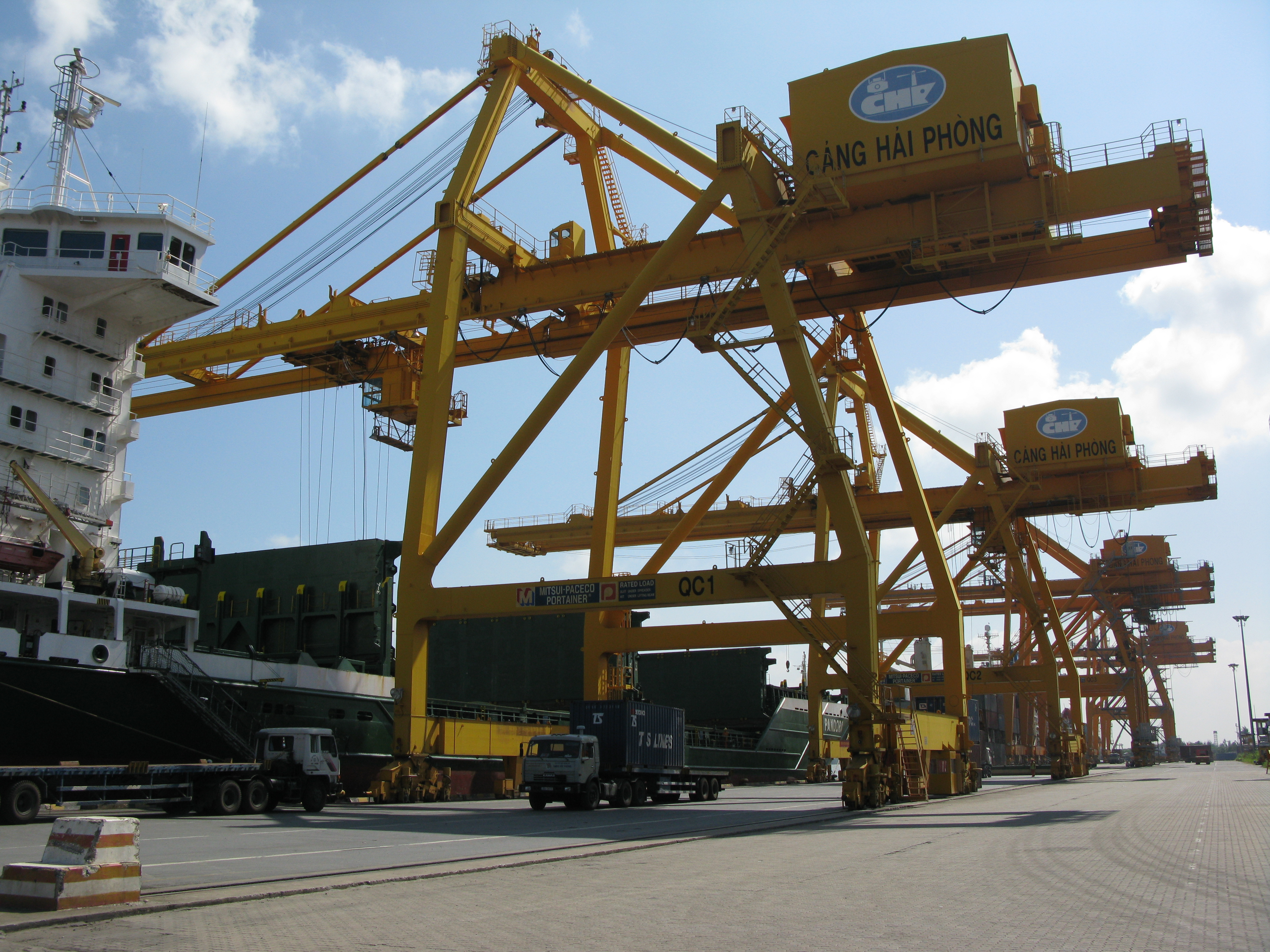
Port of Hai Phong

Vietnam operates 20 civil airports, including three international gateways: Noi Bai in Hanoi, Da Nang International Airport in Đà Nẵng, and Tan Son Nhat in Ho Chi Minh City. Tan Son Nhat is the country's largest airport, handling the majority of international passenger traffic. According to a government-approved plan, Vietnam will have another seven international airports by 2025, including Vinh International Airport, Phu Bai International Airport, Cam Ranh International Airport, Phu Quoc International Airport, Cat Bi International Airport, Can Tho International Airport, and Long Thanh International Airport. The planned Long Thanh International Airport will have an annual service capacity of 100 million passengers once it becomes fully operational in 2025. Vietnam Airlines, the state-owned national airline, maintains a fleet of 86 passenger aircraft and aims to operate 170 by 2020. Several private airlines also operate in Vietnam, including Air Mekong, Bamboo Airways, Jetstar Pacific Airlines, VASCO and VietJet Air. Vietnam has sea ports, including Cam Ranh, Đà Nẵng, Hải Phòng, Ho Chi Minh City, Hạ Long, Qui Nhơn, Vũng Tàu, Cửa Lò, and Nha Trang. Further inland, the country's network of rivers plays a role in rural transportation with over 47,130 kilometres (29,290 mi) of navigable waterways carrying ferries, barges, and water taxis.

=== Energy ===
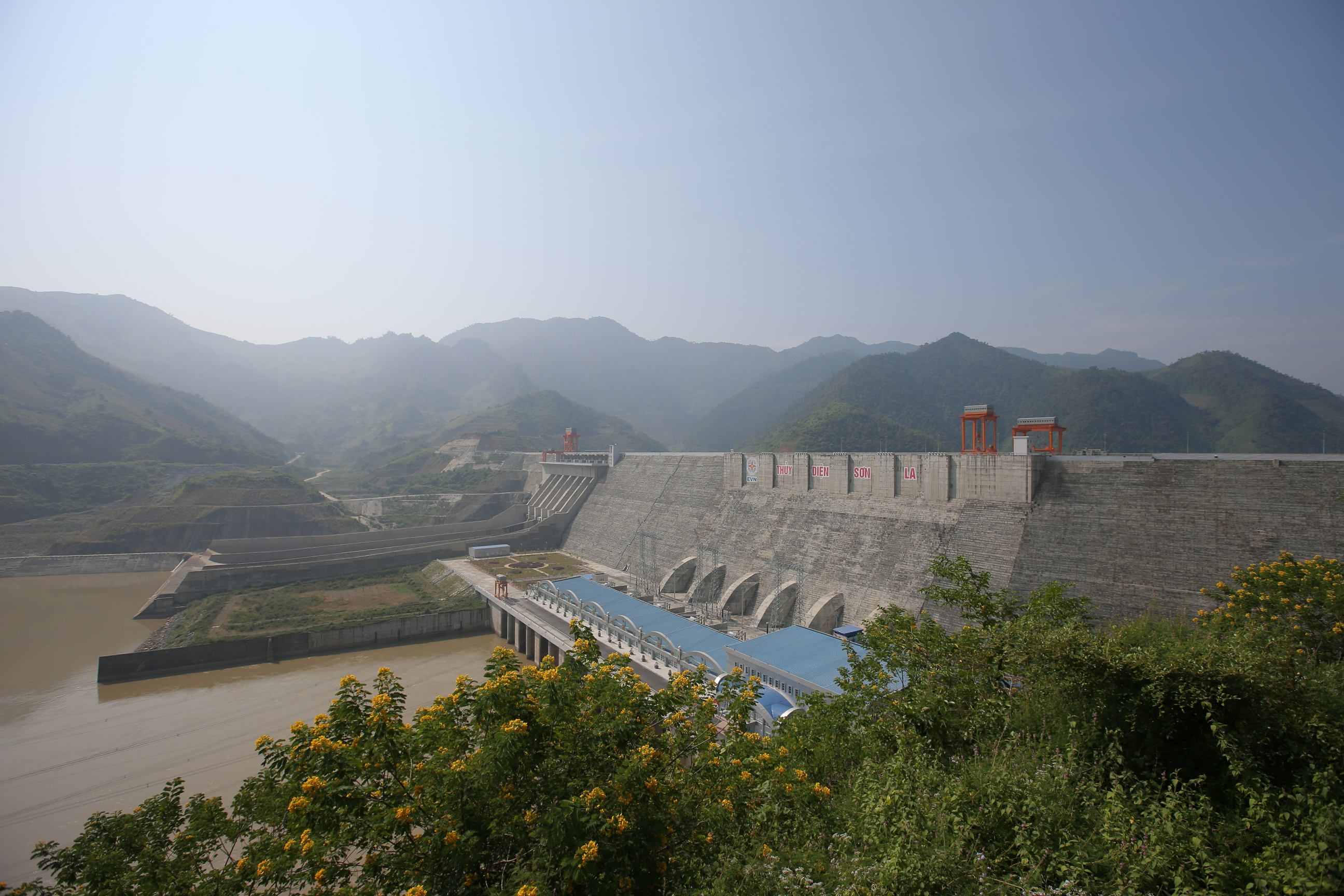
Sơn La Dam in northern Vietnam, the largest hydroelectric dam in Southeast Asia

Vietnam's energy sector is dominated largely by the state-controlled Vietnam Electricity Group (EVN). As of 2017, EVN made up about 61.4% of the country's power generation system with a total power capacity of 25,884 MW. Other energy sources are PetroVietnam (4,435 MW), Vinacomin (1,785 MW) and 10,031 MW from build–operate–transfer (BOT) investors.

Most of Vietnam's power is generated by either hydropower or fossil fuel power such as coal, oil and gas, while diesel, small hydropower and renewable energy supplies the remainder.

The household gas sector in Vietnam is dominated by PetroVietnam, which controls nearly 70% of the country's domestic market for liquefied petroleum gas (LPG). Since 2011, the company has also operated five renewable energy power plants, including the Nhơn Trạch 2 Thermal Power Plant (750 MW), Phú Quý Wind Power Plant (6 MW), Hủa Na Hydro-power Plant (180 MW), Dakdrinh Hydro-power Plant (125 MW), and Vũng Áng 1 Thermal Power Plant (1,200 MW).

According to statistics from BP, Vietnam is listed among the 52 countries that have proven crude oil reserves. In 2015, the reserve was approximately 4.4 billion barrels, ranking Vietnam in first place in Southeast Asia, while the proven gas reserves were about 0.6 trillion cubic metres (tcm) and ranking it third in Southeast Asia after Indonesia and Malaysia.

=== Telecommunication ===
Telecommunications services in Vietnam are wholly provided by the Vietnam Post and Telecommunications General Corporation (later the VNPT Group), which is a state-owned company. The VNPT retained its monopoly until 1986. The telecom sector was reformed in 1995 when the Vietnamese government began to implement a competitive policy with the creation of two domestic telecommunication companies, the Military Electronic and Telecommunication Company (Viettel, which is wholly owned by the Vietnamese Ministry of Defence) and the Saigon Post and Telecommunication Company (SPT or SaigonPostel), with 18% of it owned by VNPT. VNPT's monopoly was ended by the government in 2003 with the issuance of a decree. By 2012, the top three telecom operators in Vietnam were Viettel, Vinaphone, and MobiFone. The remaining companies included: EVNTelecom, Vietnammobile and S-Fone. With the shift towards a more market-oriented economy, Vietnam's telecommunications market is continuously being reformed to attract foreign investment, which includes the supply of services and the establishment of nationwide telecom infrastructure.

=== Water supply and sanitation ===
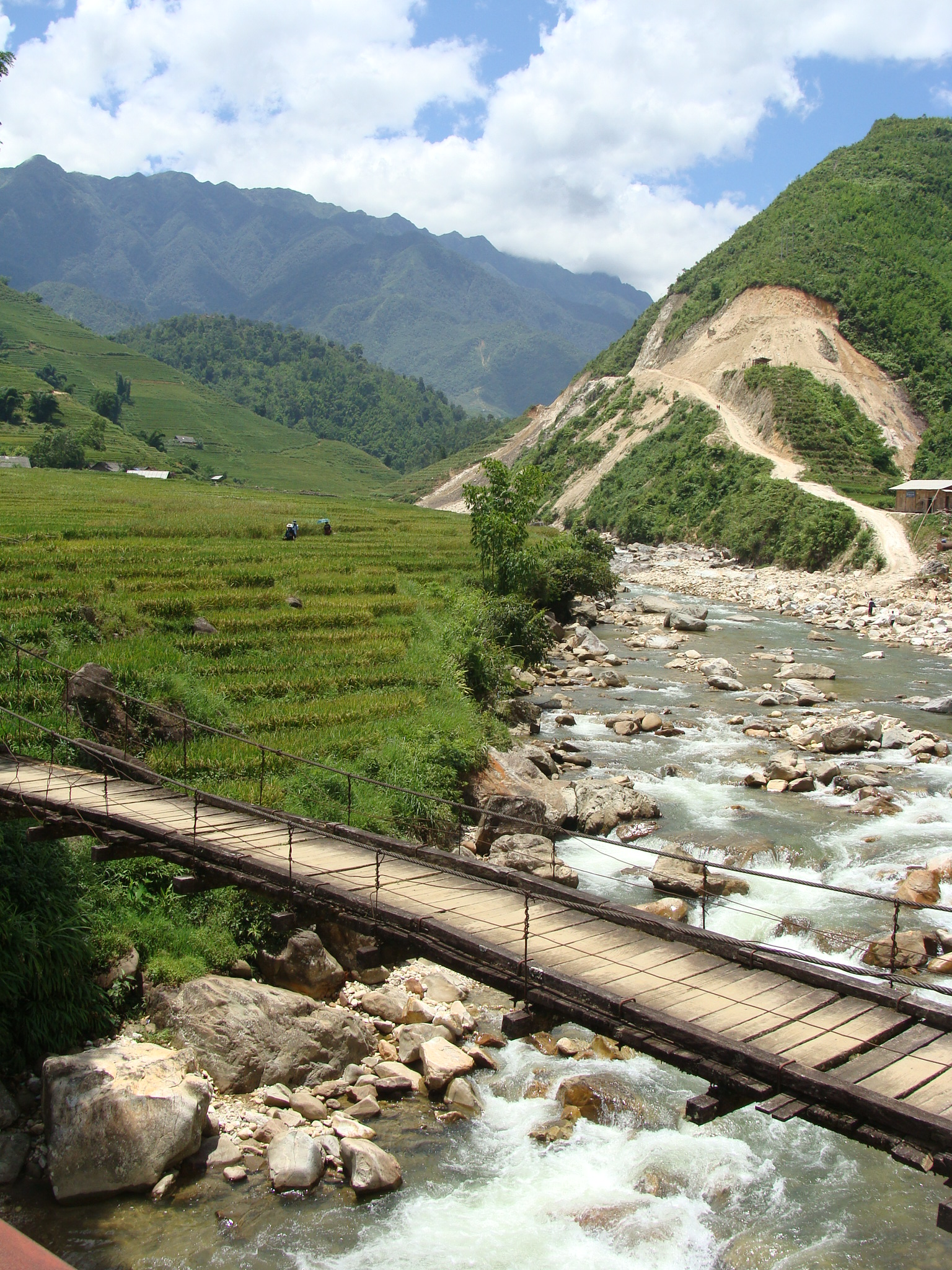
In rural areas of Vietnam, piped water systems are operated by a variety of institutions including a national organisation, people committees (local government), community groups, co-operatives and private companies.

Vietnam has 2,360 rivers with an average annual discharge of 310 billion m^{3}. The rainy season accounts for 70% of the year's discharge. Based on a 2008 survey by the Vietnam Water Supply and Sewerage Association (VWSA), existing water production capacity exceeded demand. About one-third of 727 district towns having some form of piped water supply. There is concern over the safety of existing water resources for urban and rural water supply systems. Most industrial factories release their untreated wastewater directly into the water sources. Where the government does not take measures to address the issue, most domestic wastewater is discharged, untreated, back into the environment and pollutes the surface water.

There have been some efforts and collaboration between local and foreign universities to develop access to safe water in the country by introducing water filtration systems. There is a growing concern among local populations over the public health issues associated with water contamination caused by pollution and the high levels of arsenic in groundwater sources. The government of Netherlands has been providing aid focusing its investments mainly on water-related sectors including water treatment projects. Regarding sanitation, 78% of Vietnam's population has access to "improved" sanitation—94% of the urban population and 70% of the rural population. There are about 21 million people in the country lacking access to "improved" sanitation according to a survey conducted in 2015. In 2018, the construction ministry said the country's water supply and drainage industry had been applying hi-tech methods and information technology (IT) to sanitation issues and faced problems like limited funding, climate change, and pollution. The health ministry has announced that water inspection units will be established nationwide beginning in June 2019. Inspections are to be conducted without notice, since there have been cases involving health issues caused by poor or polluted water supplies, and unhygienic conditions reported every year.

== Demographics ==
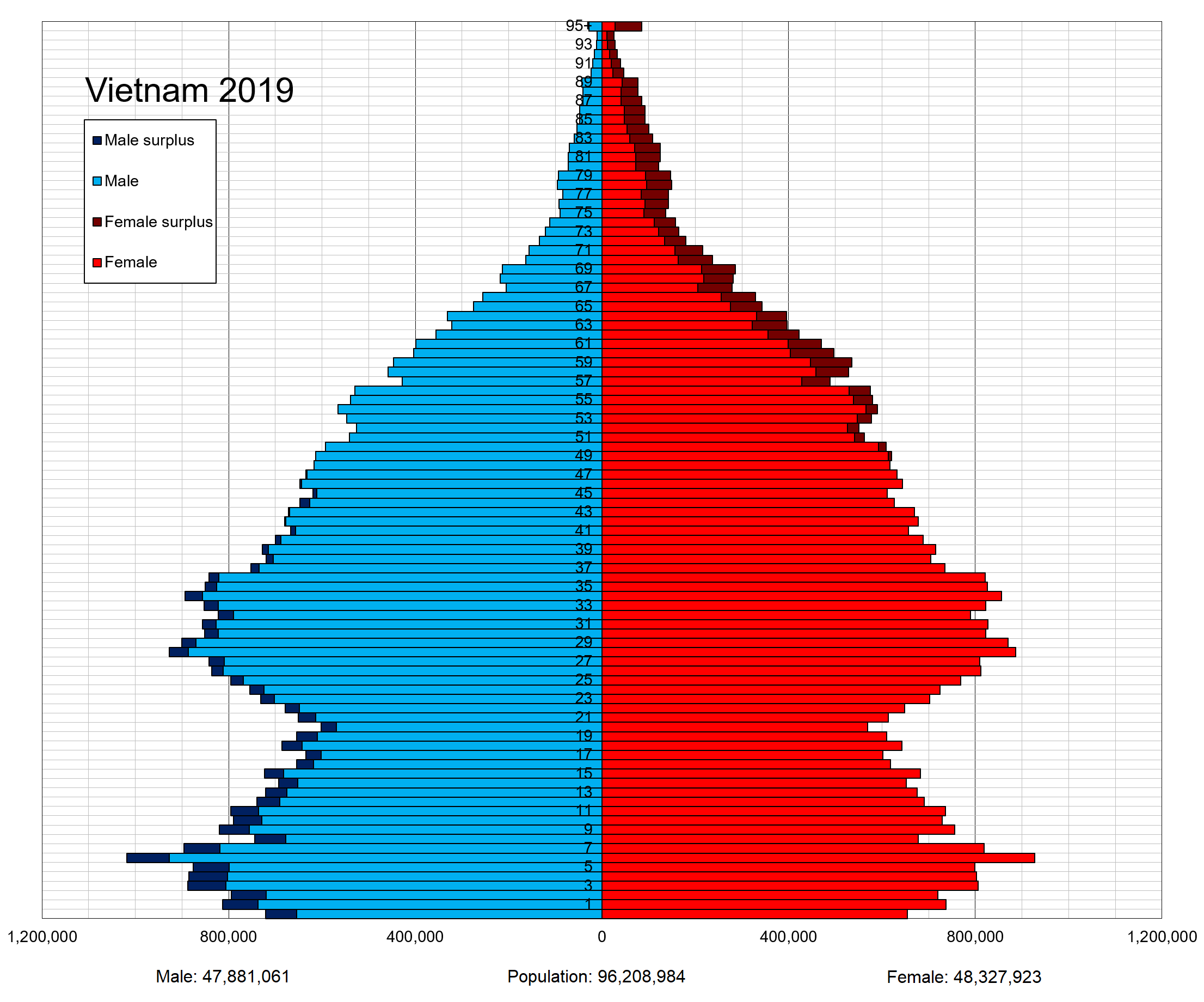
Vietnam population pyramid in 2019

Ethnic groups of Vietnam
1. Viet (85.3%)
2. Other (14.7%)

As of 2021, the population of Vietnam stands at approximately 97.5 million people. The population had grown from the 1979 census, which showed the total population of reunified Vietnam to be 52.7 million. According to the 2019 census, the country's population was 96,208,984. Based on the 2019 census, 65.6% of the Vietnamese population lives in rural areas while only 34.4% live in urban areas. The average growth rate of the urban population has increased, which is attributed mainly to migration and urbanisation. The dominant Viet or Kinh ethnic group constitute 82,085,826 people or 85.32% of the population. Most of their population is concentrated in the country's alluvial deltas and coastal plains. In Vietnam, 54 ethnic groups are officially recognised, including the Tày, Thái, Nùng, Hmong, and Dao. Some ethnic minorities, including the Mường who are more closely related to the Kinh, dwell in the highlands, which cover two-thirds of Vietnam's territory.

Before the 20th century, the Central Highlands was predominantly inhabited by the indigenous Montagnard peoples, comprising more than 40 tribal groups. The South Vietnamese government later enacted a programme of resettling Kinh in the areas. The Hoa (ethnic Chinese), Cham, and Khmer Krom people are mainly lowlanders. Throughout Vietnam's history, Chinese people, largely from South China, migrated to the country as administrators, merchants, and refugees. Since the reunification in 1976, an increase in communist policies nationwide resulted in the nationalisation and confiscation of property, especially from the Hoa in the south and the wealthy in cities. This led some of them to leave Vietnam.

=== Urbanisation ===
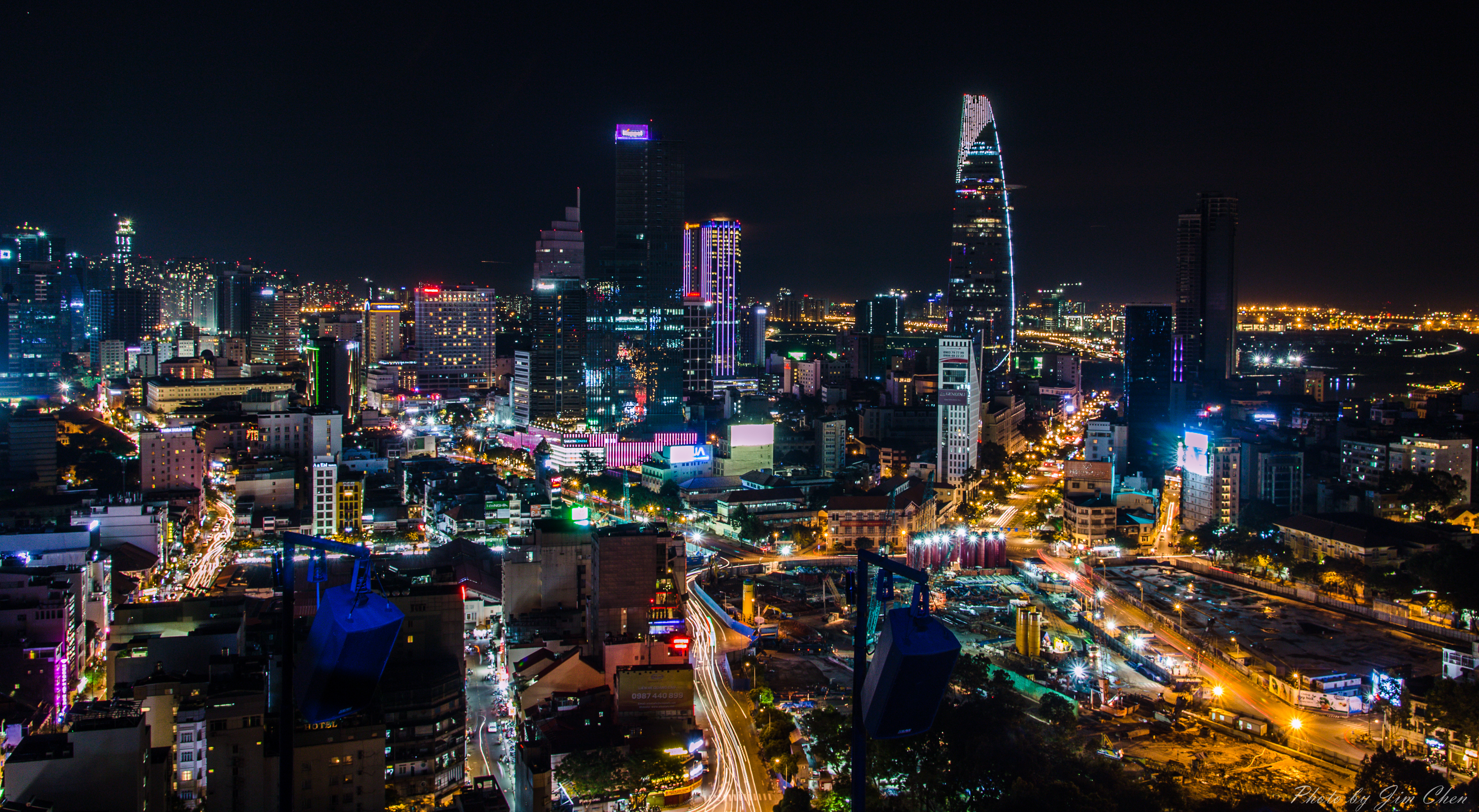
District 1, Ho Chi Minh City

The number of people who live in urbanised areas in 2019 was 33,122,548 people (with the urbanisation rate at 34.4%). Since 1986, Vietnam's urbanisation rates have surged after the Vietnamese government implemented the Đổi Mới economic programme, changing the system into a socialist one and liberalising property rights. As a result, Hanoi and Ho Chi Minh City increased their share of the total urban population from 8.5% and 24.9% to 15.9% and 31% respectively. The Vietnamese government, through its construction ministry, forecasts the country will have a 45% urbanisation rate by 2020, while it was confirmed to be 34.4% according to the 2019 census. The urbanisation movement in Vietnam is mainly between the rural areas and the country's Southeast region.

A study shows that rural-to-urban area migrants have a higher standard of living than non-migrants in rural areas and non-migrants in urban areas. This results in changes to economic structures. In 1985, agriculture made up 37.2% of Vietnam's GDP; in 2008, that number had declined to 18.5%. In 1985, industry made up only 26.2% of Vietnam's GDP; by 2008, that number had increased to 43.2%. Urbanisation also helps to improve basic services, which increase people's standards of living. Access to electricity grew from 14% of total households with electricity in 1993 to above 96% in 2009. In terms of access to fresh water, data from 65 utility companies show that 12% of households in the area covered by them had access to the water network in 2002; by 2007, more than 70% of the population was connected. Urbanisation also creates more traffic, and air and water pollution.

Some Vietnamese use mopeds for transportation. Their numbers have been known to cause traffic congestion and air pollution in Vietnam. In the capital city alone, the number of mopeds increased from 0.5 million in 2001 to 4.7 million in 2013. With development, factories have sprung up which indirectly pollute the air and water, for example, in the 2016 Vietnam marine life disaster. The government is intervening and attempting solutions to decrease air pollution by decreasing the number of motorcycles while increasing public transportation. It has introduced more regulations for waste handling. The amount of solid waste generated in urban areas of Vietnam has increased by more than 200% from 2003 to 2008. Industrial solid waste accounted for 181% of that increase. One of the government's efforts includes attempting to promote campaigns that encourage locals to sort household waste, since waste sorting is still not practised by most of Vietnamese society.

Largest cities and provincial wards in Vietnam Source: 2019 Vietnamese census, National Assembly (Note: Some cities were established or expanded after the 2019 census was conducted, including Thủ Đức, Thuận An, Huế, Dĩ An, Vinh, Tân Uyên, Thanh Hóa, Thủy Nguyên, Bắc Giang, Hạ Long.) (Note: Excluding converted population (including temporary residents).)
Rank	Name	Province	Pop.	Rank	Name	Province	Pop.
1	Ho Chi Minh City	Municipality	14,002,598	11	Trấn Biên	Đồng Nai	197,060
2	Hanoi	Municipality	8,807,523	12	Nam Định	Ninh Bình	188,751
3	Haiphong	Municipality	4,664,124	13	Buôn Ma Thuột	Đắk Lắk	169,596
4	Cần Thơ	Municipality	4,199,824	14	Long Bình	Đồng Nai	168,614
5	Bắc Ninh	Municipality	3,619,433	15	Long Xuyên	An Giang	154,858
6	Da Nang	Municipality	3,065,628	16	Hoa Lư	Ninh Bình	148,406
7	Quảng Ninh	Municipality	1,497,447	17	Trường Vinh	Nghệ An	141,477
8	Huế	Municipality	1,432,986	18	Tam Hiệp	Đồng Nai	139,441
9	Rạch Giá	An Giang	250,661	19	Cao Lãnh	Đồng Tháp	137,387
10	Hạc Thành	Thanh Hóa	197,142	20	Nha Trang	Khánh Hòa	136,118

=== Languages ===
The national language of the country is Vietnamese, a tonal Vietic language in the Austroasiatic language family, which is spoken by the majority of the population. Vietnam's minority groups speak a variety of languages, including: Tày, Nùng, Mường, Cham, Khmer, Chinese (largely Cantonese, Teochew, and Hakka), and Hmong. The Montagnard peoples of the Central Highlands also speak distinct languages, some belonging to the Austroasiatic and others to the Malayo-Polynesian language families.

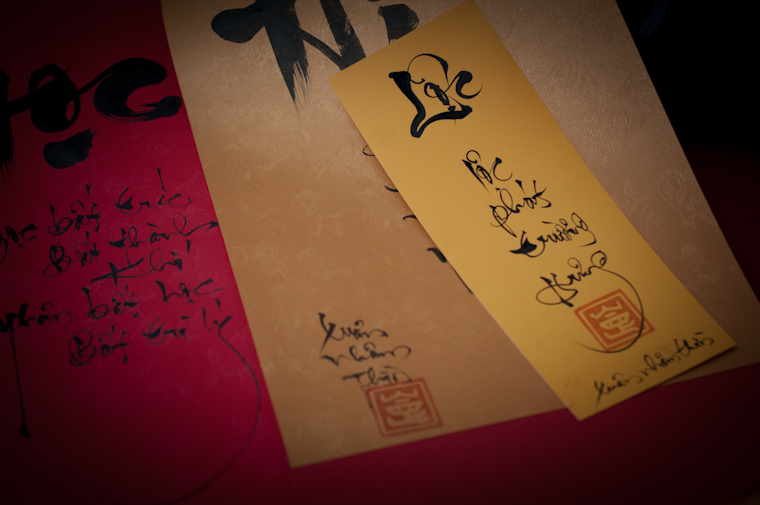
Vietnamese calligraphy in Latin alphabet

The French language, a legacy of colonial rule, is spoken by some educated Vietnamese as a second language, especially among those educated in the former South Vietnam, where it was a principal language in administration, education, and commerce. Vietnam remains a full member of the International Organisation of the Francophonie (La Francophonie) and education has revived some interest in the language. Russian, and to a lesser extent German, Czech, and Polish are known among some northern Vietnamese whose families had ties with the Eastern Bloc during the Cold War. With improved relations with Western countries and reforms in Vietnamese administration, English has been increasingly used as a second language, and the study of English is obligatory in most schools either alongside or in place of French. The popularity of Japanese, Korean, and Mandarin Chinese has also grown as the country's ties with other East Asian nations have strengthened. Third-graders can choose one of seven languages (English, Russian, French, Chinese, Japanese, Korean, German) as their first foreign language. In Vietnam's high school graduation examinations, students can take their foreign language exam in one of the above-mentioned languages.

=== Religion ===
Religion in Vietnam (2021)
1. Vietnamese folk religion or no religion (73.0%)
2. Buddhism (14.3%)
3. Catholicism (7.10%)
4. Protestantism (1.20%)
5. Hoahaoism (1.50%)
6. Caodaism (1.20%)
7. Islam (0.08%)
8. Others (1.62%)

Article 70 of the 1992 Constitution of Vietnam declares freedom of belief and religion for all citizens. Accordingly, places of worship are protected under Vietnamese law, while religious beliefs and practices are subject to laws and regulations governing religion. According to a 2007 survey 81% of Vietnamese people did not believe in a god. Based on government findings in 2009, the number of religious people increased by 932,000. The official statistics, presented by the Vietnamese government to the United Nations special rapporteur in 2014, indicate the overall number of followers of recognised religions is about 24 million of a total population of almost 90 million.

According to the white paper Religions and Religious Policy in Vietnam (2023), in 2021 Vietnam had 36 denominational organizations belonging to 16 religions that had received state recognition and registration to operate, with 26.5 million adherents accounting for 27% of the population. According to the white paper, Buddhists accounted for 14.3% of the total population, Catholics 7.1%, Protestants 1.2%, Hoahaoist 1.5%, and Caodaists 1.2%. Other government-recognized religions include Tịnh độ cư sĩ, Islam, Baháʼí, Adventists, Tứ Ân Hiếu Nghĩa, Minh Sư đạo, Minh Lý đạo, Hinduism, Latter-day Saints, Bửu Sơn Kỳ Hương, and Hiếu Nghĩa Tà Lơn.

The majority of Vietnamese do not follow any organised religion, while some of them observe some form of Vietnamese folk religion and elements of Buddhism. Confucianism as a system of social and ethical philosophy still has certain influences in modern Vietnam. Mahāyāna is the dominant branch of Buddhism, while Theravada is practised mostly by the Khmer minority. Due to the ambiguity of what constitutes being Buddhist and the influence of Buddhism on Vietnamese culture, estimates of the Buddhist population vary, with the Vietnam Buddhist Sangha claiming about 10 million adherents in 2010. About 8 to 9% of the population is Christian, made up of Catholics and Protestants. Catholicism was introduced to Vietnam in the 16th century and was firmly established by Jesuit missionaries (mainly Portuguese and Italian) in the 17th century from nearby Portuguese Macau. French missionaries (from the Paris Foreign Missions Society) and Spanish missionaries (from the Dominican Order) engaged in missionary work in the 18th, 19th, and first half of the 20th century. A number of Vietnamese people, especially in the South, are also adherents of two indigenous religions of syncretic Caodaism and semi-Buddhist Hoahaoism. Protestantism was spread by Canadian and American missionaries in the 20th century; the largest Protestant denomination is the Evangelical Church of Vietnam. Around 770,000 of the country's Protestants are members of ethnic minorities, particularly the highland Montagnards and Hmong people. Protestantism has experienced more significant growth in Vietnam in the 21st century. Several other minority faiths exist in Vietnam; these include Sunni, non-denominational, and syncretic Bani schools of Islam, which are practised primarily among the ethnic Cham minority. There are also Kinh adherents of Islam, other minority adherents of Baháʼí, and Hindus among the Cham.

=== Education ===
General education in Vietnam is divided into five categories: kindergarten, elementary schools, middle schools, high schools, and universities. A number of public schools have been constructed across the country to raise the national literacy rate, which stood at 90% in 2008. Most universities are located in cities of Hanoi and Ho Chi Minh City, with the country's education system continuously undergoing a series of reforms by the government. Some families may have trouble paying tuition fees for their children without some form of public or private assistance. The number of colleges and universities increased in the 2000s from 178 in 2000 to 299 in 2005. In higher education, the government provides subsidised loans for students through the national bank, while there are concerns about access to the loans and the burden on students to repay them. Since 1995, enrolment in higher education has grown tenfold to over 2.2 million with 84,000 lecturers and 419 institutions of higher education. Some foreign universities operate private campuses in Vietnam, including Harvard University (United States) and the Royal Melbourne Institute of Technology (Australia). In 2018, a decree on university autonomy allowing them to operate independently without ministerial control was in its final stages of approval. The government will continue investing in education, especially for the poor, to have access to basic education.

=== Health ===
Development of life expectancy in Vietnam since 1950

By 2015, 97% of the population had access to improved water sources. In 2016, Vietnam's national life expectancy stood at 80.9 years for women and 71.5 for men, and the infant mortality rate was 17 per 1,000 live births. Since the partition, North Vietnam has established a public health system that has reached down to the hamlet level. After the national reunification in 1975, a nationwide health service was established. In the 1980s, the quality of healthcare declined to some degree as a result of budgetary constraints, a shift of responsibility to the provinces, and the introduction of charges. Inadequate funding has also contributed to a shortage of nurses, midwives and hospital beds; in 2000, Vietnam had 24.7 hospital beds per 10,000 people before declining to 23.7 in 2005 as stated in the annual report of Vietnamese Health Ministry.

Since the 2000s, Vietnam has made progress in combating malaria. The malaria mortality rate fell to about 5% of its 1990s equivalent by 2005 after the country introduced improved antimalarial drugs and treatment. Tuberculosis (TB) cases are on the rise. TB has become the second most infectious disease in the country after respiratory-related illness. With an intensified vaccination programme, better hygiene, and foreign assistance, Vietnam hopes to reduce sharply the number of TB cases and new TB infections. In 2004, government subsidies covered about 15% of health care expenses. That year, the United States announced Vietnam would be one of 15 states to receive funding as part of its global AIDS relief plan. By the following year, Vietnam had diagnosed 101,291 human immunodeficiency virus (HIV) cases, of which 16,528 progressed to acquired immune deficiency syndrome (AIDS); 9,554 had died. The actual number of HIV-positive individuals is estimated to be higher. On average, between 40 and 50 new infections are reported daily in the country. In 2007, 0.4% of the population was estimated to be infected with HIV. More global aid is being delivered through The Global Fund to Fight AIDS, Tuberculosis and Malaria to fight the spread of the disease in the country. In September 2018, the Hanoi People's Committee urged the citizens of the country to stop eating dog and cat meat as it can cause diseases like rabies and leptospirosis. More than 1,000 stores in the capital city of Hanoi were found to be selling both meats. The decision prompted positive comments among Vietnamese on social media, while some noted that the consumption of dog meat will remain an ingrained habit among many people.

== Culture ==
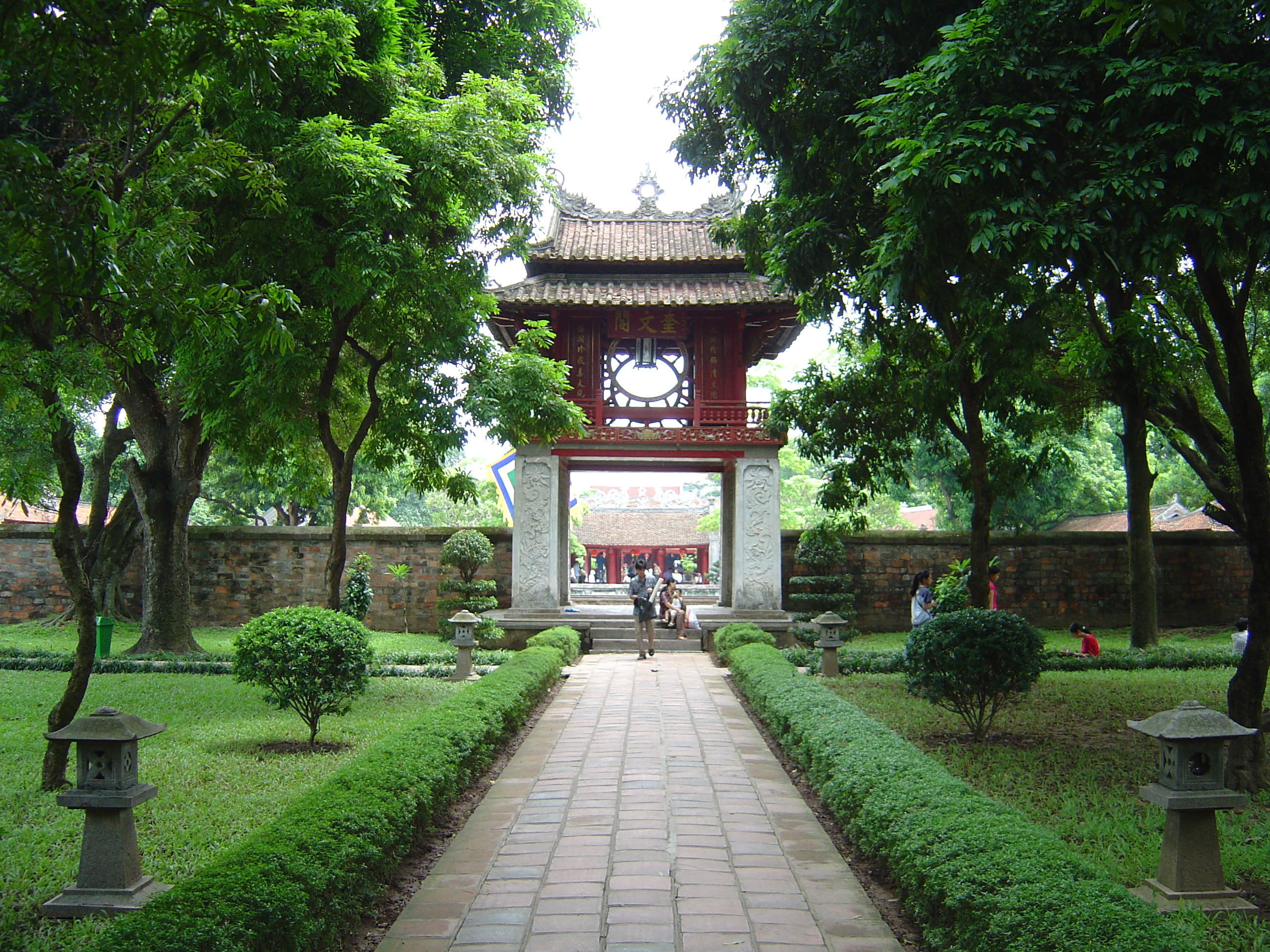
The Temple of Literature in Hanoi

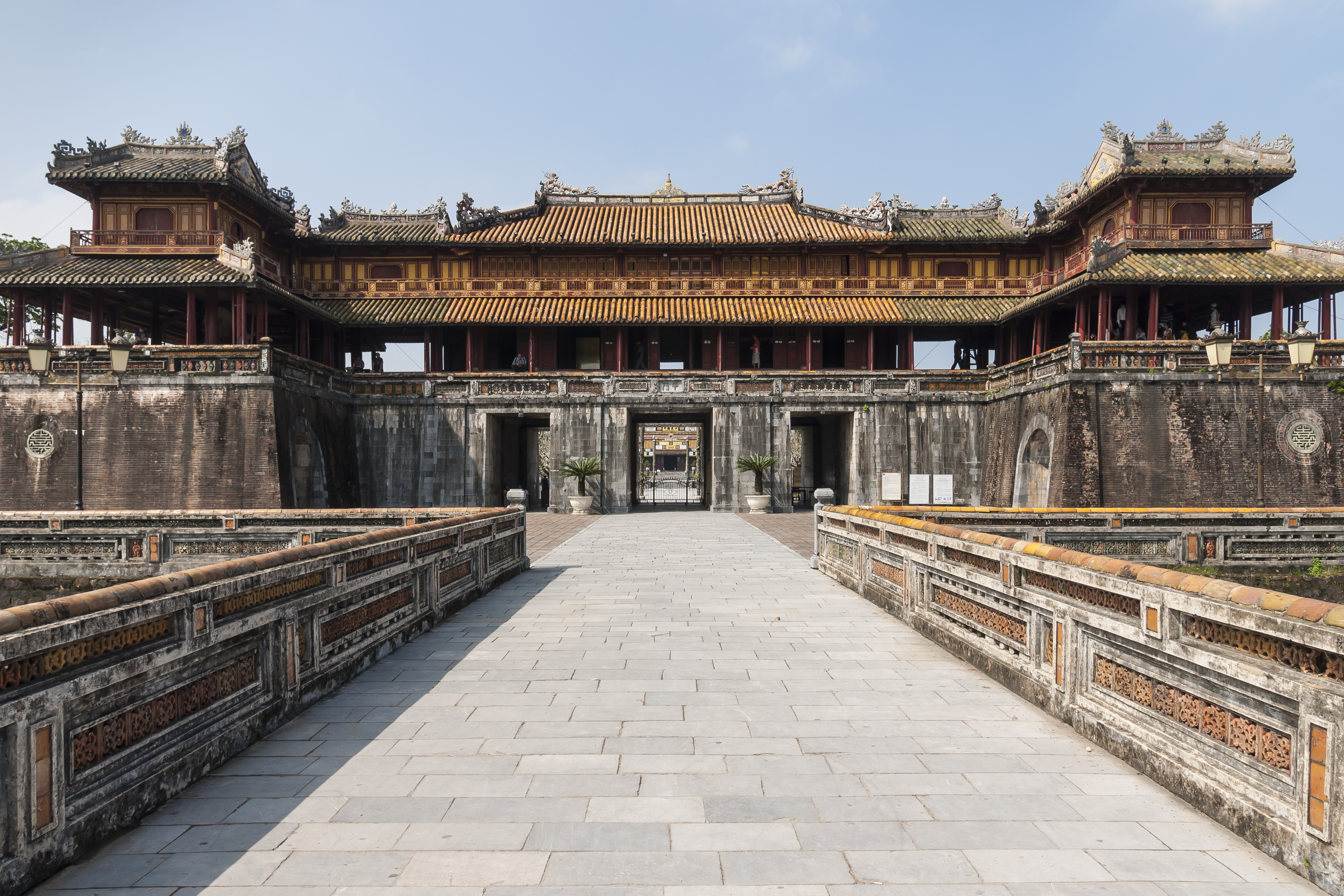
The Imperial City of Huế

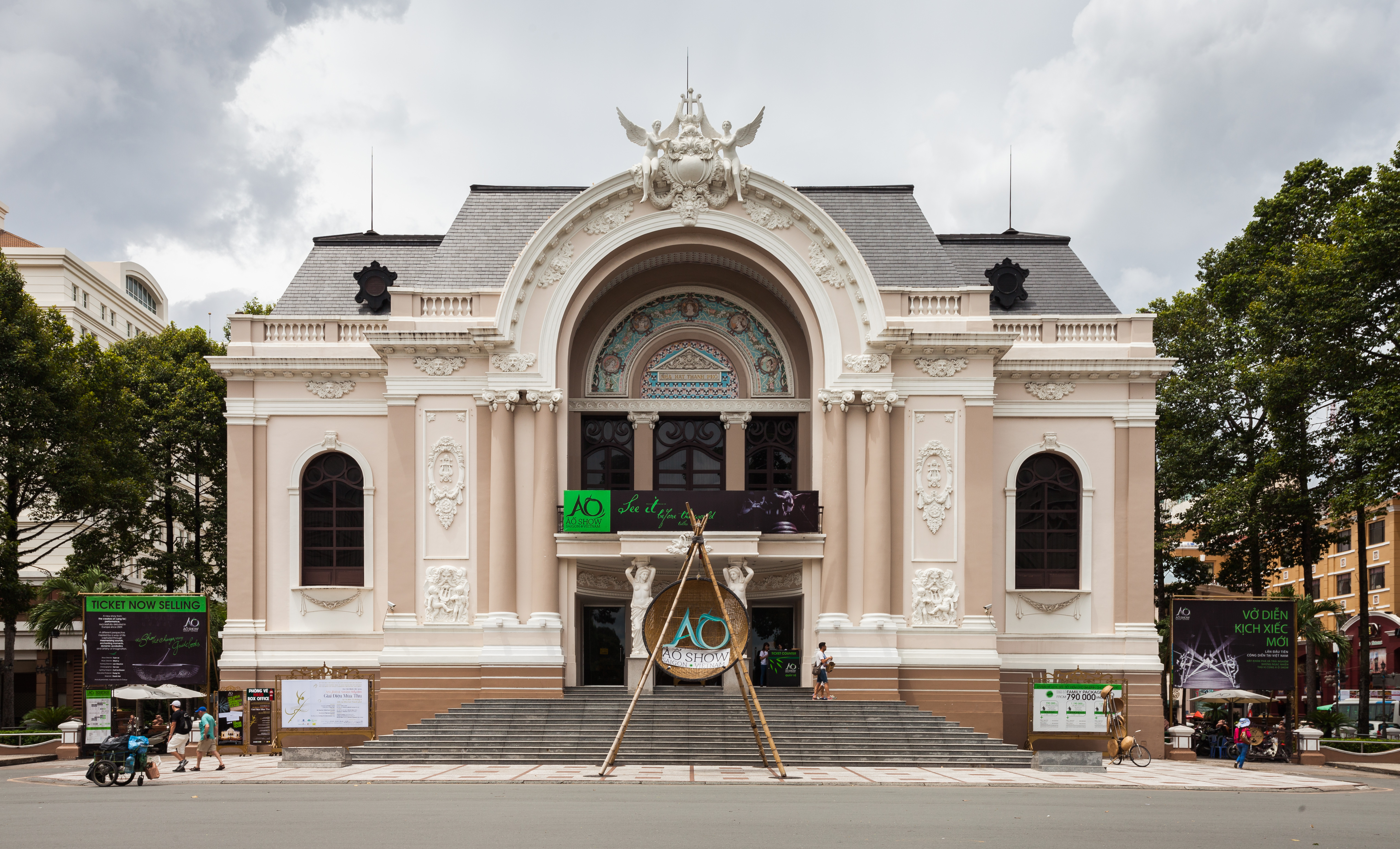
The Municipal Theatre (Saigon Opera House) in Ho Chi Minh City

Vietnam's culture has developed over the centuries from the indigenous ancient Đông Sơn culture with wet rice cultivation as its economic base. Some elements of the nation's culture have Chinese origins, drawing on elements of Confucianism, Mahāyāna Buddhism, and Taoism in its political system and philosophy. Historically, Vietnamese society has been structured around làng (villages). Vietnamese mark a common ancestral anniversary on the tenth day of the third lunar month. The influence of Chinese culture is more evident in the north, affecting both elite traditions and popular customs. There are several Chinatowns in the south, such as in Chợ Lớn, where some ethnic Chinese have intermarried with Kinh and are no longer distinguishable from them. In the central and southern parts of Vietnam, traces of Champa and Khmer culture are evidenced through the remains of ruins, artefacts, and within their population as the successor of the ancient Sa Huỳnh culture. In later centuries, Western cultures have become popular among later generations of Vietnamese.

The traditional focuses of Vietnamese culture are based on humanity (nhân nghĩa) and harmony (hòa), in which family and community values are highly regarded. Vietnam reveres a number of cultural symbols, such as the Vietnamese dragon which is derived from crocodile and snake imagery. Other images that are also revered are the turtle, buffalo, and horse. Some Vietnamese also believe in the supernatural and spiritualism where illness can be brought on by a curse or sorcery or caused by non-observance of a religious ethic. Traditional medical practitioners, amulets, and other forms of spiritual protection and religious practices may be employed to treat the ill person.

A Vietnamese formal dress, the áo dài, is worn for special occasions such as weddings and religious festivals. Other examples of Vietnamese clothing include the áo tứ thân, a four-piece woman's dress; the áo ngũ, a form of the thân in five-piece form, mostly worn in the north of the country; the yếm, a woman's undergarment; the áo bà ba, rural working "pyjamas" for men and women; the áo gấm, a formal brocade tunic for government receptions; and the áo the, a variant of the áo gấm worn by grooms at weddings. Traditional headwear includes the standard conical nón lá, the "lampshade-like" nón quai thao, and the traditional turban, khăn vấn.

=== Literature ===
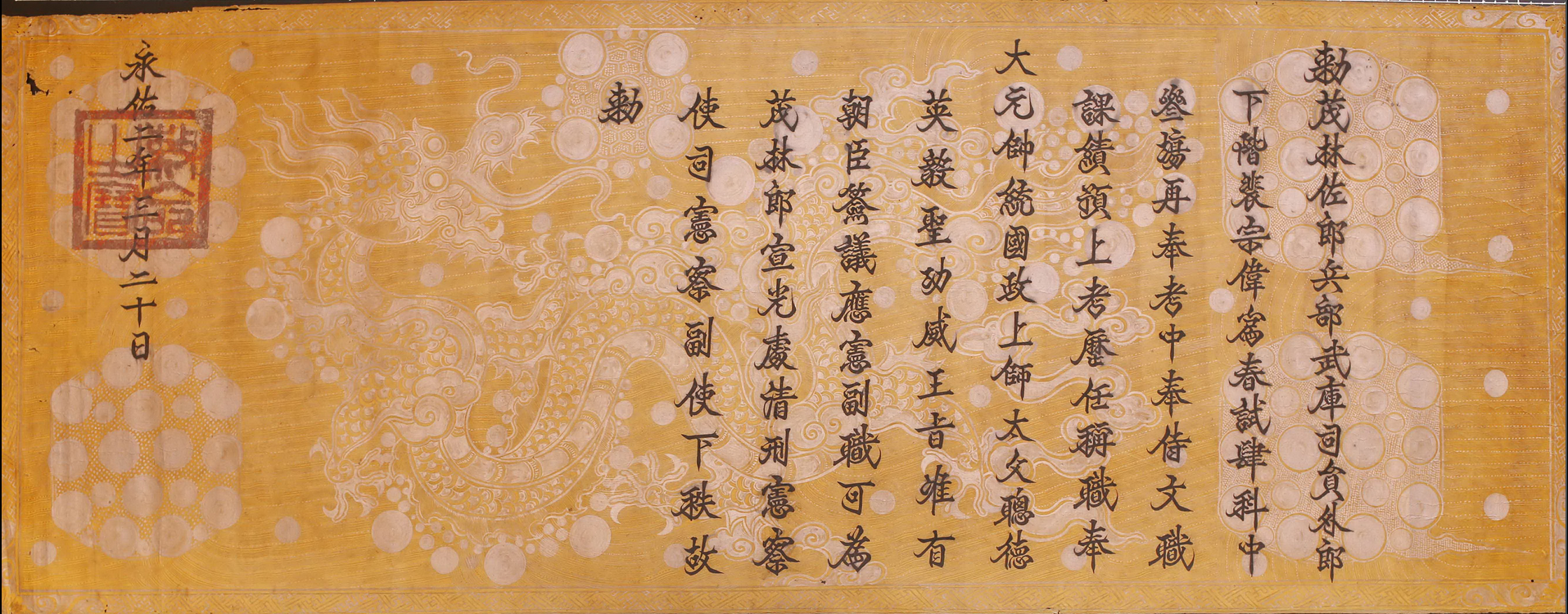
Vietnamese dragon on Emperor Vĩnh Hựu's c. 1736 edict conferring a title

Vietnamese literature has a centuries-deep history and the country has a tradition of folk literature based on the typical–to-eight-verse poetic form (lục bát) called ca dao. Written literature has been found dating back to the 10th century Ngô dynasty. Some literary genres play a role in theatrical performance, such as hát nói in ca trù. Some poetic unions have also been formed in Vietnam, such as the tao đàn. Vietnamese literature has been influenced by Western styles in later times, with the first literary transformation movement of thơ mới emerging in 1932. Vietnamese folk literature is an intermingling of forms. It is not only an oral tradition, but a mixing of three media: hidden (only retained in the memory of folk authors), fixed (written), and shown (performed). Folk literature exists in versions, passed down orally, and has unknown authors. Myths consist of stories about supernatural beings, heroes, and creator gods, and reflect the viewpoint of ancient people about human life. They consist of creation stories, stories about their origins, culture heroes, and other folklore tales.

=== Music ===
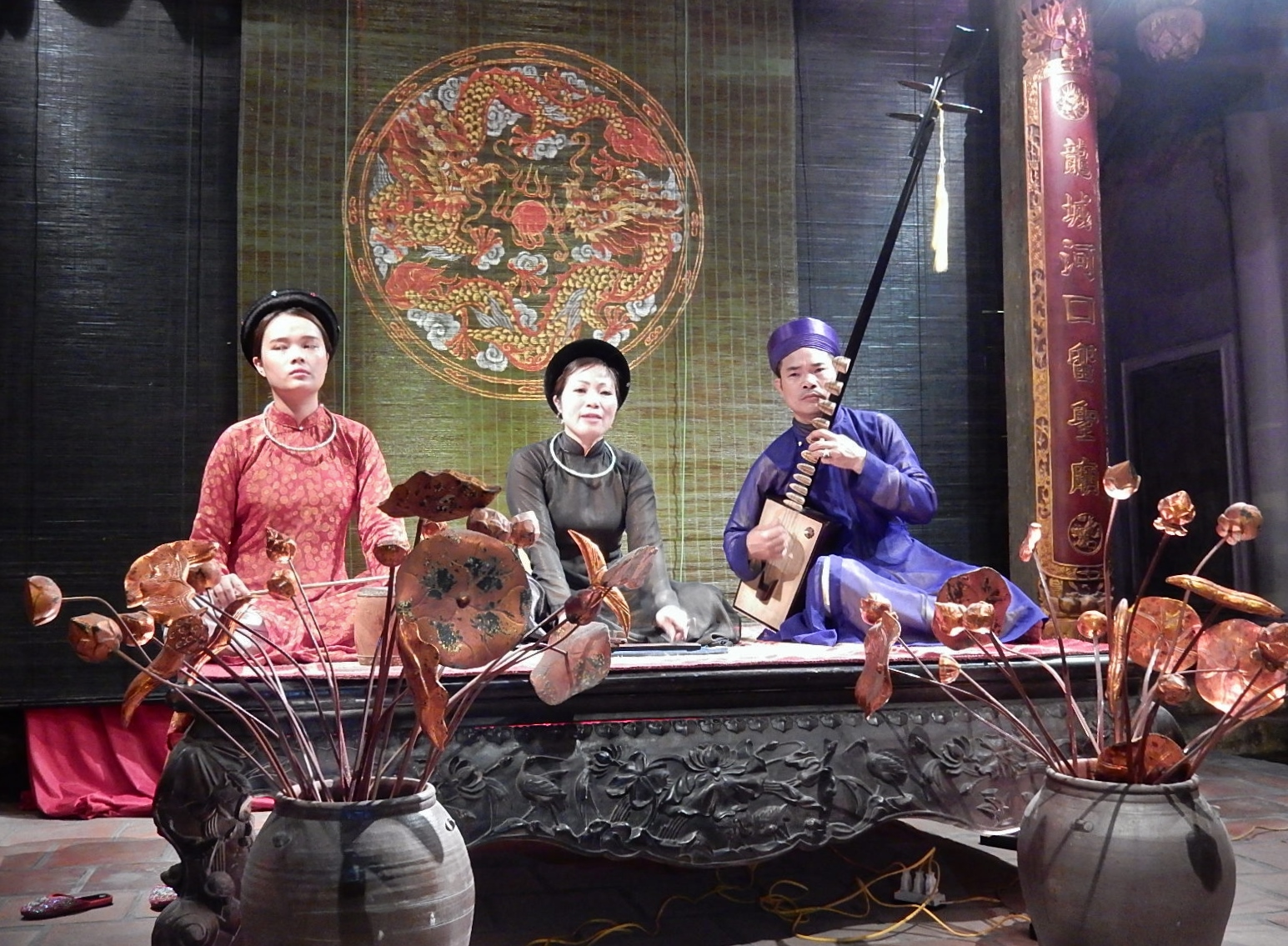
Ca trù trio performance in northern Vietnam

Traditional Vietnamese music varies between the country's northern and southern regions. Northern classical music is Vietnam's oldest musical form and is traditionally more formal. The origins of Vietnamese classical opera (tuồng) can be traced to the Mongol invasions in the 13th century when the Vietnamese captured a Chinese opera troupe. Throughout its history, Vietnam has been the most heavily impacted by the Chinese musical tradition along with those of Japan, Korea and Mongolia. Nhã nhạc is a refined form of imperial court music, chèo is a form of generally satirical musical theatre, while xẩm is a type of Vietnamese folk music. Quan họ (alternate singing) is most popular in the Bắc Ninh province. Another form of music called chầu văn is used to invoke spirits during ceremonies. Nhạc dân tộc cải biên is a form of Vietnamese folk music which arose in the 1950s, while ca trù is a form of sung poetry. Hò is a genre of work songs performed in central and southern Vietnam. There is a range of traditional instruments, including the đàn bầu (a monochord zither), the đàn gáo (a two-stringed fiddle with coconut body), and the đàn nguyệt (a two-stringed fretted moon lute). There have been some efforts at mixing Vietnamese traditional music—especially folk music—with modern music to revive and promote national music in the modern context and educate the younger generations about Vietnam's traditional musical instruments and singing styles. Bolero music has gained popularity in the country since the 1930s, with a different style—a combination of traditional Vietnamese music with Western elements. In the 21st century, the Vietnamese pop music industry known as V-pop incorporates elements of genres worldwide, such as electronic, dance and R&B.

=== Media ===
Vietnam Television (VTV), the main state television station

Vietnam's media sector is regulated by the government under the 2004 Law on Publication. It is perceived that the country's media sector is controlled by the government and follows the official communist party line. The Voice of Vietnam (VOV) is the official state-run national radio broadcasting service, broadcasting internationally via shortwave using rented transmitters in other countries and providing broadcasts from its website, while Vietnam Television (VTV) is the national television broadcasting company. Since 1997, Vietnam has regulated public internet access using legal and technical means. The resulting lockdown is referred to as the "Bamboo Firewall". The collaborative project OpenNet Initiative classifies Vietnam's level of online political censorship to be "pervasive", while Reporters Without Borders (RWB) considers Vietnam to be one of 15 global "internet enemies". While the government of Vietnam maintains that such censorship is necessary to safeguard the country against obscene or sexually explicit content, some political and religious websites that are deemed to be undermining state authority are also blocked.

=== Cuisine ===
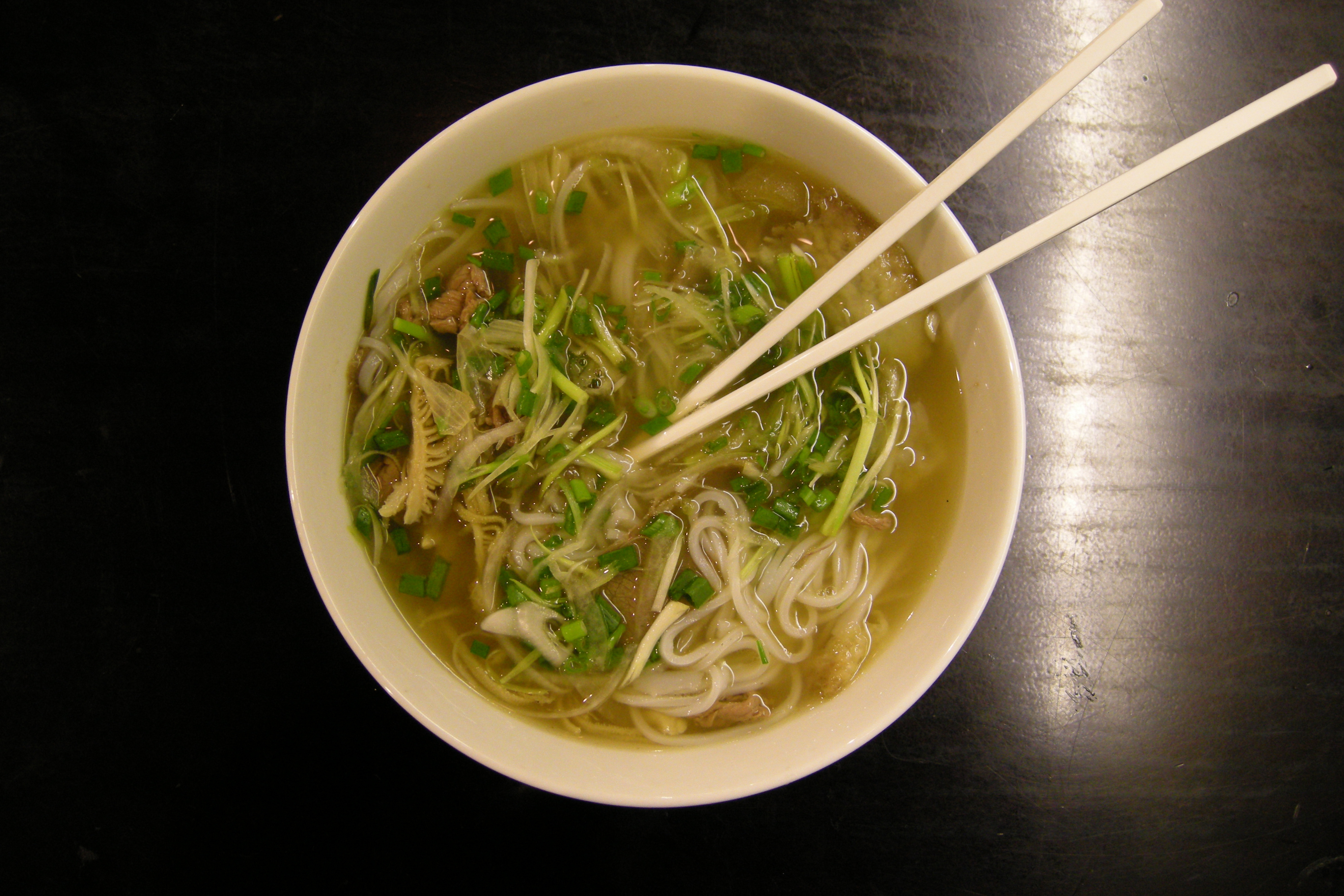
A bowl of phở in Ho Chi Minh City

Traditionally, Vietnamese cuisine is based around five fundamental taste "elements" (Vietnamese: ngũ vị): spicy (metal), sour (wood), salty (water), bitter (fire), and sweet (earth). Ingredients include fish sauce, shrimp paste, soy sauce, rice, fresh herbs, fruits, and vegetables. Vietnamese recipes use lemongrass, ginger, mint, rau răm, long coriander, Saigon cinnamon, bird's eye chilli, lime and basil leaves.

Traditional Vietnamese cooking is known for its fresh ingredients, minimal use of oil, and reliance on herbs and vegetables. Instead freshwater fish, crustaceans (particularly crabs), and molluscs became more widely used. Fish sauce, soy sauce, prawn sauce, and limes are among the main flavouring ingredients. Vietnam has a street food culture, with 40 popular dishes found throughout the country. Some dishes such as gỏi cuốn (salad roll), bánh cuốn (rice noodle roll), bún riêu (rice vermicelli soup) and phở noodles originated in the north and were introduced to central and southern Vietnam by northern migrants.

Local foods in the north are often less spicy than southern dishes, as the colder northern climate limits the production and availability of spices.

While drinks are usually served cold with ice cubes, especially during the summer, hot drinks, such as tea, may be served to treat illnesses and welcome guests. Some examples of basic Vietnamese drinks include cà phê đá (Vietnamese iced coffee), cà phê trứng (egg coffee), chanh muối (salted pickled lime juice), cơm rượu (glutinous rice wine), nước mía (sugarcane juice) and trà sen (Vietnamese lotus tea).

=== Holidays and festivals ===
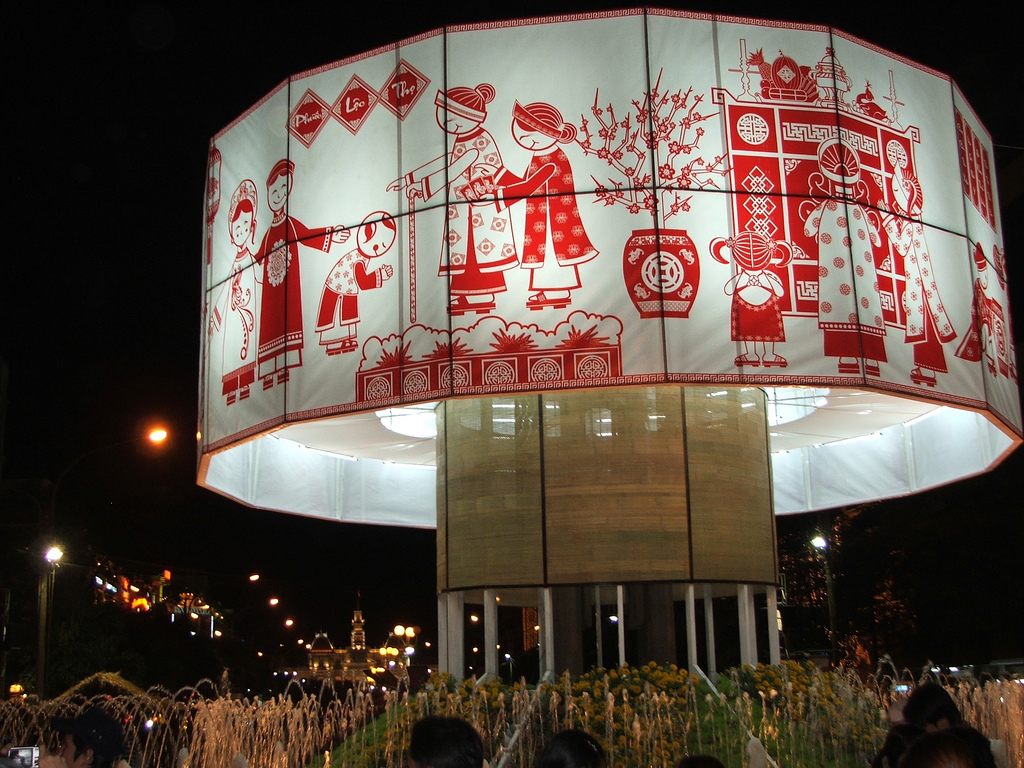
Tết decoration in the country seen during the holiday

The country has eleven nationally recognised holidays. These include: New Year's Day on 1 January; lunisolar Vietnamese New Year (Tết Nguyên Đán) from the last day of the last lunar month to fifth day of the first lunar month; Hùng Kings' Festival on the 10th day of the third lunar month; Reunification Day on 30 April; International Workers' Day on 1 May; and National Day on 2 September. During Tết, some Vietnamese from cities return to their hometowns or villages for family reunions and to pray for dead ancestors. Older people may give the young a lì xì (red envelope), while holiday food, such as bánh chưng (rice cake) in a square shape together with variety of dried fruits, are presented in the house for visitors. Other festivals include Tết Nguyên Tiêu, Tết Trung Thu, and temple and nature festivals. In the highlands, Elephant Race Festivals are held annually in spring; riders will ride their elephants for about 1.6 km (0.99 mi) and the winning elephant will be given sugarcane.

=== Sports ===
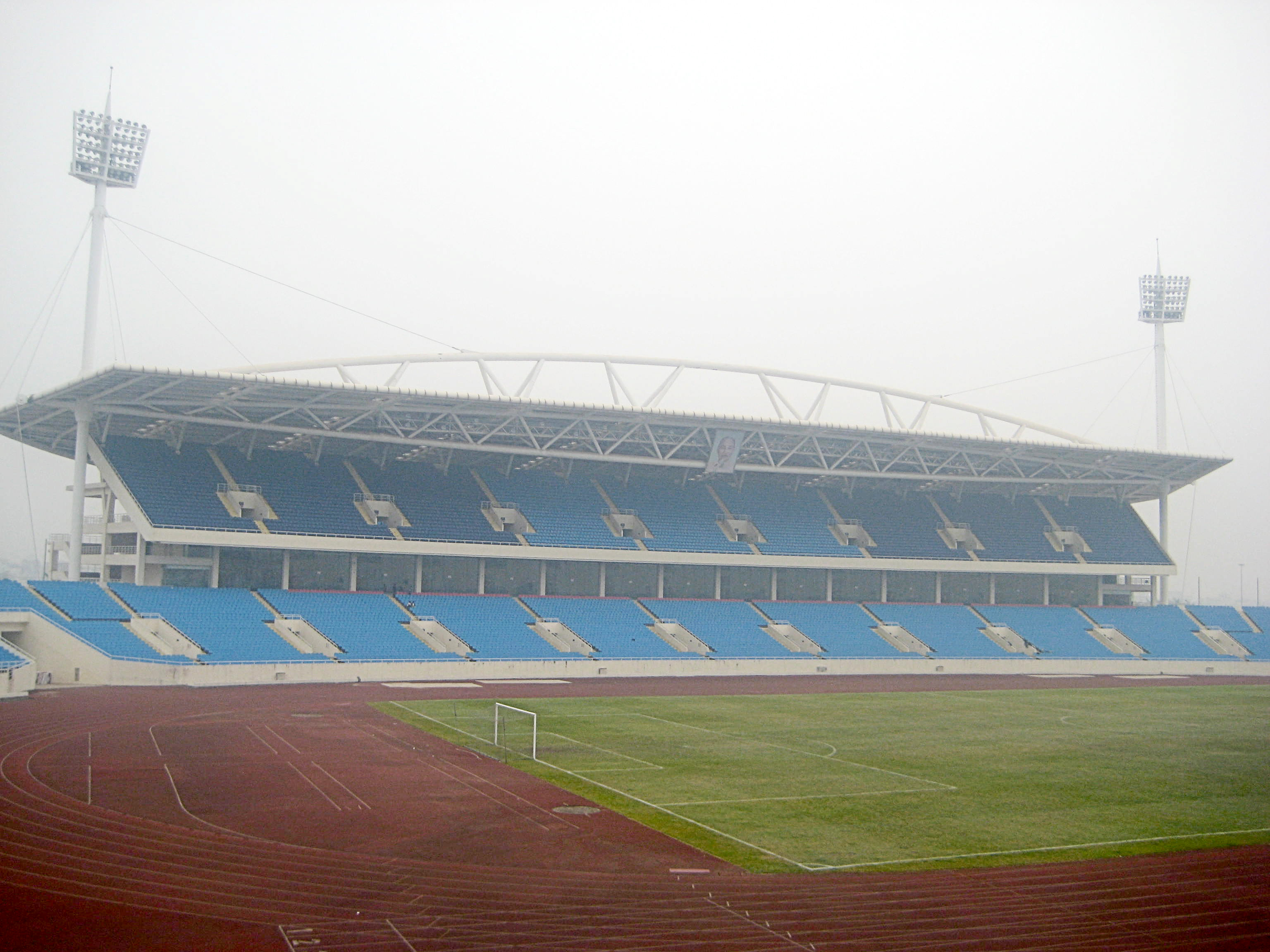
Mỹ Đình National Stadium in Hanoi

The Vovinam, Kim Kê and Võ Bình Định are practiced in Vietnam. Western sports such as association football, badminton, chess, ping-pong, tennis, and volleyball are also practiced. Vietnam has participated in the Summer Olympic Games since 1952. After the partition of the country in 1954, only South Vietnam competed in the games, sending athletes to the 1956 and 1972 Olympics. Since the reunification of Vietnam in 1976, it has competed as the Socialist Republic of Vietnam, attending every Summer Olympics from 1988 onwards. TheVietnam Olympic Committee was formed in 1976 and recognised by the International Olympic Commi ttee (IOC) in 1979. In 2016, Vietnam won its first gold medal at the Olympics. Basketball has become an increasingly popular sport in Vietnam, especially in Ho Chi Minh City, Hanoi and Can Tho (formerly Soc Trang).

== See also ==
- Outline of Vietnam

== Sources ==
=== Print ===
- Proceedings of the Regional Dialogue on Biodiversity and Natural Resources Management in Mainland Southeast Asian Economies, Kunming Institute of Botany, Yunnan, China, 21–24 February 1995. Natural Resources and Environment Program, Thailand Development Research Institute Foundation. 1995.
- Vietnam: Selected Issues. International Monetary Fund. 1999. ISBN 978-1-4519-8721-8.
- Selections from Regional Press. Vol. 20. Institute of Regional Studies. 2001.
- Peasant and Labour. University of California. 1972.
- Adhikari, Ramesh; Kirkpatrick, Colin H.; Weiss, John (1992). Industrial and Trade Policy Reform in Developing Countries. Manchester University Press. ISBN 978-0-7190-3553-1.
- Akazawa, Takeru; Aoki, Kenichi; Kimura, Tasuku (1992). The evolution and dispersal of modern humans in Asia. Hokusen-sha. ISBN 978-4-938424-41-1.
- Alterman, Eric (2005). When Presidents Lie: A History of Official Deception and Its Consequences. Penguin. ISBN 978-0-14-303604-3.
- Anderson, James A.; Whitmore, John K. (2014). China's Encounters on the South and Southwest: Reforging the Fiery Frontier Over Two Millennia. Brill Publishers. ISBN 978-90-04-28248-3.
- Anderson, Wanni Wibulswasdi; Lee, Robert G. (2005). Displacements and Diasporas: Asians in the Americas. Rutgers University Press. ISBN 978-0-8135-3611-8.
- Asian Development Bank (2010). Asian Development Outlook 2010 Update. Asian Development Bank. ISBN 978-92-9092-181-3.
- Boobbyer, Claire; Spooner, Andrew (2013). Vietnam, Cambodia & Laos Footprint Handbook. Footprint Travel Guides. ISBN 978-1-907263-64-4.
- Asselin, Pierre (2024). Vietnam's American War: A New History. Cambridge University Press. ISBN 978-1-009-22930-2. Archived from the original on 30 May 2025.
- Brigham, Robert Kendall (1998). Guerrilla Diplomacy: The NLF's Foreign Relations and the Viet Nam War. Cornell University Press. ISBN 978-0-8014-3317-7.
- Buttinger, Joseph (1968). Vietnam: A Political History. New York City: Praeger.
- Calo, Ambra (2009). Trails of Bronze Drums Across Early Southeast Asia: Exchange Routes and Connected Cultural Spheres. Archaeopress. ISBN 978-1-4073-0396-3.
- Chen, Steven (2018). The Design Imperative: The Art and Science of Design Management. Springer Publishing. ISBN 978-3-319-78568-4.
- Chesneaux, Jean (1966). The Vietnamese Nations: Contribution to a History. Current Book Distributors.
- Chico, Beverly (2013). Hats and Headwear around the World: A Cultural Encyclopedia: A Cultural Encyclopedia. ABC-CLIO. ISBN 978-1-61069-063-8.
- Cook, Bernard A. (2001). Europe Since 1945: An Encyclopedia. Taylor & Francis. ISBN 978-0-8153-4057-7.
- Cooke, Nola; Li, Tana; Anderson, James (2011). The Tongking Gulf Through History. University of Pennsylvania Press. ISBN 978-0-8122-4336-9.
- Cortada, James W. (1994). Spain in the Nineteenth-century World: Essays on Spanish Diplomacy, 1789–1898. Greenwood Press. ISBN 978-0-313-27655-2.
- Cosslett, Tuyet L.; Cosslett, Patrick D. (2013). Water Resources and Food Security in the Vietnam Mekong Delta. Springer Science + Business Media. ISBN 978-3-319-02198-0.
- Cosslett, Tuyet L.; Cosslett, Patrick D. (2017). Sustainable Development of Rice and Water Resources in Mainland Southeast Asia and Mekong River Basin. Springer Publishing. ISBN 978-981-10-5613-0.
- Cottrell, Robert C. (2009). Vietnam. Infobase Publishing. ISBN 978-1-4381-2147-5.
- Dayley, Robert (2018). Southeast Asia in the New International Era. Taylor & Francis. ISBN 978-0-429-97424-3.
- de Laet, Sigfried J.; Herrmann, Joachim (1996). History of Humanity: From the seventh century B.C. to the seventh century A.D. Routledge. ISBN 978-92-3-102812-0.
- de Mora, Javier Calvo; Wood, Keith (2014). Practical Knowledge in Teacher Education: Approaches to teacher internship programmes. Taylor & Francis. ISBN 978-1-317-80333-1.
- Dennell, Robin; Porr, Martin (2014). Southern Asia, Australia, and the Search for Human Origins. Cambridge University Press. ISBN 978-1-107-72913-1.
- DK (2017). The Vietnam War: The Definitive Illustrated History. Dorling Kindersley. ISBN 978-0-241-30868-4.
- Dodd, Jan; Lewis, Mark (2003). Vietnam. Rough Guides. ISBN 978-1-84353-095-4.
- Dohrenwend, Bruce P.; Turse, Nick; Wall, Melanie M.; Yager, Thomas J. (2018). Surviving Vietnam: Psychological Consequences of the War for US Veterans. Oxford University Press. ISBN 978-0-19-090444-9.
- Duc Tran, Hong; Thu Ha, Anh (2000). A Brief Chronology of Vietnam's History. Thế Giới Publishers.
- Duy Hinh, Nguyen; Dinh Tho, Tran (2015). The South Vietnamese Society. Normanby Press. ISBN 978-1-78625-513-6.
- Eggleston, Michael A. (2014). Exiting Vietnam: The Era of Vietnamization and American Withdrawal Revealed in First-Person Accounts. McFarland Publishing. ISBN 978-0-7864-7772-2.
- Elliott, Mai (2010). RAND in Southeast Asia: A History of the Vietnam War Era. RAND Corporation. ISBN 978-0-8330-4915-5.
- Englar, Mary (2006). Vietnam: A Question and Answer Book. Capstone Publishers. ISBN 978-0-7368-6414-5.
- Frankum, Ronald B. Jr. (2011). Historical Dictionary of the War in Vietnam. Scarecrow Press. ISBN 978-0-8108-7956-0.
- Frohlich, Holger L.; Schreinemachers, Pepijn; Stahr, Karl; Clemens, Gerhard (2013). Sustainable Land Use and Rural Development in Southeast Asia: Innovations and Policies for Mountainous Areas. Springer Science + Business Media. ISBN 978-3-642-33377-4.
- Gettleman, Marvin E.; Franklin, Jane; Young, Marilyn B.; Franklin, H. Bruce (1995). Vietnam and America: A Documented History. Grove Press. ISBN 978-0-8021-3362-5.
- Gibbons, William Conrad (2014). The U.S. Government and the Vietnam War: Executive and Legislative Roles and Relationships, Part III: 1965–1966. Princeton University Press. ISBN 978-1-4008-6153-8.
- Gilbert, Adrian (2013). Encyclopedia of Warfare: From the Earliest Times to the Present Day. Taylor & Francis. ISBN 978-1-135-95697-4.
- Goscha, Christopher (2016). Vietnam: A New History. Basic Books. ISBN 978-0-465-09437-0. Archived from the original on 30 June 2025.
- Gravel, Mike (1971). The Pentagon Papers: The Defense Department History of United States Decision-making on Vietnam. Beacon Press. ISBN 978-0-8070-0526-2.
- Green, Thomas A. (2001). Martial Arts of the World: A-Q. ABC-CLIO. ISBN 978-1-57607-150-2.
- Guillemot, François (2004). "Au coeur de la fracture vietnamienne : l'élimination de l'opposition nationaliste et anticolonialiste dans le Nord du Vietnam (1945–1946)". In Goscha, Christopher E.; de Tréglodé, Benoît (eds.). Naissance d'un État-Parti: Le Viêt Nam depuis 1945. Paris: Les Indes savantes. pp. 175–216. ISBN 978-2-84654-064-3. Archived from the original on 22 May 2022.
- Gunn, Geoffrey C. (2014). Rice Wars in Colonial Vietnam: The Great Famine and the Viet Minh Road to Power. Rowman & Littlefield Publishers. ISBN 978-1-4422-2303-5.
- Gustafsson, Mai Lan (2010). War and Shadows: The Haunting of Vietnam. Cornell University Press. ISBN 978-0-8014-5745-6.
- Hampson, Fen Osler (1996). Nurturing Peace: Why Peace Settlements Succeed Or Fail. US Institute of Peace Press. ISBN 978-1-878379-55-9.
- Heneghan, George Martin (1969). Nationalism, Communism and the National Liberation Front of Vietnam: Dilemma for American Foreign Policy. Department of Political Science, Stanford University.
- Hien Le, Nang (2003). Three victories on the Bach Dang river. Nhà xuất bản Văn hóa-thông tin.
- Hoang, Anh Tuan (2007). Silk for Silver: Dutch-Vietnamese Relations, 1637–1700. Brill Publishers. ISBN 978-90-04-15601-2.
- Holcombe, Alec (2020). Mass Mobilization in the Democratic Republic of Vietnam, 1945–1960. University of Hawaiʻi Press. ISBN 978-0-8248-8447-5. JSTOR j.ctv105bb0z. Archived from the original on 12 February 2022.
- Holmgren, Jennifer (1980). Chinese colonisation of northern Vietnam: administrative geography and political development in the Tongking Delta, first to sixth centuries A.D. Australian National University, Faculty of Asian Studies: distributed by Australian University Press. ISBN 978-0-909879-12-9.
- Hong Lien, Vu; Sharrock, Peter (2014). Descending Dragon, Rising Tiger: A History of Vietnam. Reaktion Books. ISBN 978-1-78023-388-8.
- Howard, Michael C. (2016). Textiles and Clothing of Việt Nam: A History. McFarland & Company. ISBN 978-1-4766-2440-2.
- Howe, Brendan M. (2016). Post-Conflict Development in East Asia. Routledge. ISBN 978-1-317-07740-4.
- Isserman, Maurice; Bowman, John Stewart (2009). Vietnam War. Infobase Publishing. ISBN 978-1-4381-0015-9.
- Joes, Anthony James (1992). Modern Guerrilla Insurgency. ABC-CLIO. ISBN 978-0-275-94263-2.
- Jones, John R. (1998). Guide to Vietnam. Bradt Publications. ISBN 978-1-898323-67-9.
- Jukes, Geoffrey (1973). The Soviet Union in Asia. University of California Press. ISBN 978-0-520-02393-2.
- Karlstrom, Anna; Kallen, Anna (2002). Southeast Asian Archaeology. Östasiatiska Samlingarna (Stockholm, Sweden), European Association of Southeast Asian Archaeologists. International Conference. Museum of Far Eastern Antiquities, Stockholm. ISBN 978-91-970616-0-5.
- Keith, Charles (2012). Catholic Vietnam: A Church from Empire to Nation. University of California Press. ISBN 978-0-520-95382-6.
- Keyes, Charles F. (1995). The Golden Peninsula: Culture and Adaptation in Mainland Southeast Asia. University of Hawaii Press. ISBN 978-0-8248-1696-4.
- Khanh Huynh, Kim (1986). Vietnamese Communism, 1925–1945. Cornell University Press. ISBN 978-0-8014-9397-3.
- Khoo, Nicholas (2011). Collateral Damage: Sino-Soviet Rivalry and the Termination of the Sino-Vietnamese Alliance. Columbia University Press. ISBN 978-0-231-15078-1.
- Kiernan, Ben (2017). Việt Nam: A History from Earliest Times to the Present. Oxford University Press. ISBN 978-0-19-516076-5.
- Kissi, Edward (2006). Revolution and Genocide in Ethiopia and Cambodia. Lexington Books. ISBN 978-0-7391-1263-2.
- Knoblock, John; Riegel, Jeffrey (2001). The Annals of Lü Buwei. Stanford University Press. ISBN 978-0-8047-3354-0.
- Koblitz, Neal (2009). Random Curves: Journeys of a Mathematician. Springer Science + Business Media. ISBN 978-3-540-74078-0.
- Kort, Michael G. (2017). The Vietnam War Reexamined. Cambridge University Press. doi:10.1017/9781107110199. ISBN 978-1-107-11019-9.
- Koskoff, Ellen (2008). The Concise Garland Encyclopedia of World Music: The Middle East, South Asia, East Asia, Southeast Asia. Routledge. ISBN 978-0-415-99404-0.
- Ky Phuong, Trần; Lockhart, Bruce M. (2011). The Cham of Vietnam: History, Society and Art. NUS Press. ISBN 978-9971-69-459-3.
- Lamport, Mark A. (2018). Encyclopedia of Christianity in the Global South. Rowman & Littlefield Publishers. ISBN 978-1-4422-7157-9.
- Largo, V. (2002). Vietnam: Current Issues and Historical Background. Nova Publishers. ISBN 978-1-59033-368-6.
- Leonard, Jane Kate (1984). Wei Yuan and China's Rediscovery of the Maritime World. Harvard Univ Asia Center. ISBN 978-0-674-94855-6.
- Levinson, David; Christensen, Karen (2002). Encyclopedia of Modern Asia. Charles Scribner's Sons. ISBN 978-0-684-31247-7.
- Lewandowski, Elizabeth J. (2011). The Complete Costume Dictionary. Scarecrow Press. ISBN 978-0-8108-4004-1.
- Lewy, Guenter (1980). America in Vietnam. Oxford University Press. ISBN 978-0-19-991352-7.
- Li, Tana (1998). Nguyễn Cochinchina: Southern Vietnam in the Seventeenth and Eighteenth Centuries. SEAP Publications. ISBN 978-0-87727-722-4.
- Li, Xiaobing (2012). China at War: An Encyclopedia. ABC-CLIO. ISBN 978-1-59884-415-3.
- Lieberman, Victor (2003). Strange Parallels: Integration of the Mainland Southeast Asia in Global Context, c. 800–1830, Vol 1. Cambridge University Press.
- Lim, David (2014). Economic Growth and Employment in Vietnam. Taylor & Francis. ISBN 978-1-317-81859-5.
- Litvack, Jennie; Litvack, Jennie Ilene; Rondinelli, Dennis A. (1999). Market Reform in Vietnam: Building Institutions for Development. Greenwood Publishing Group. ISBN 978-1-56720-288-5.
- Lockard, Craig A. (2010). Societies, Networks, and Transitions, Volume 2: Since 1450. Cengage Learning. ISBN 978-1-4390-8536-3.
- Marr, David G. (2013). Vietnam: State, War, and Revolution (1945–1946). University of California Press. ISBN 978-0-520-95497-7. Archived from the original on 8 July 2025.
- McLeod, Mark W. (1991). The Vietnamese Response to French Intervention, 1862–1874. Greenwood Publishing Group. ISBN 978-0-275-93562-7.
- Meggle, Georg (2004). Ethics of Humanitarian Interventions. Walter de Gruyter. ISBN 978-3-11-032773-1.
- Miettinen, Jukka O. (1992). Classical Dance and Theatre in South-East Asia. Oxford University Press. ISBN 978-0-19-588595-8.
- Miller, Robert Hopkins (1990). United States and Vietnam 1787–1941. DIANE Publishing. ISBN 978-0-7881-0810-5.
- Moise, Edwin E. (2017). Land Reform in China and North Vietnam: Consolidating the Revolution at the Village Level. University of North Carolina Press. ISBN 978-0-8078-7445-5.
- Muehlenbeck, Philip Emil; Muehlenbeck, Philip (2012). Religion and the Cold War: A Global Perspective. Vanderbilt University Press. ISBN 978-0-8265-1852-1.
- Murray, Geoffrey (1997). Vietnam Dawn of a New Market. St. Martin's Press. ISBN 978-0-312-17392-0.
- Neville, Peter (2007). Britain in Vietnam: Prelude to Disaster, 1945–46. Routledge. ISBN 978-1-134-24476-8.
- Olsen, Mari (2007). Soviet-Vietnam Relations and the Role of China 1949–64: Changing Alliances. Routledge. ISBN 978-1-134-17413-3.
- Olson, Gregory A. (2012). Mansfield and Vietnam: A Study in Rhetorical Adaptation. MSU Press. ISBN 978-0-87013-941-3.
- Ooi, Keat Gin; Anh Tuan, Hoang (2015). Early Modern Southeast Asia, 1350–1800. Routledge. ISBN 978-1-317-55919-1.
- Ooi, Keat Gin (2004). Southeast Asia: A Historical Encyclopedia, from Angkor Wat to East Timor. ABC-CLIO. ISBN 978-1-57607-770-2.
- Oxenham, Marc; Buckley, Hallie (2015). The Routledge Handbook of Bioarchaeology in Southeast Asia and the Pacific Islands. Routledge. ISBN 978-1-317-53401-3.
- Oxenham, Marc; Tayles, Nancy (2006). Bioarchaeology of Southeast Asia. Cambridge University Press. ISBN 978-0-521-82580-1.
- Pelley, Patricia M. (2002). Postcolonial Vietnam: New Histories of the National Past. Duke University Press. ISBN 978-0-8223-2966-4.
- Phan, Khoang (1976). Việt sử: xứ đàng trong, 1558–1777. Cuộc nam-tié̂n của dân-tộc Việt-Nam. Nhà Sách Khai Trí (in Vietnamese). Xuân thu. Archived from the original on 4 January 2024.
- Phuong Linh, Huynh Thi (2016). State-Society Interaction in Vietnam. LIT Verlag Münster. ISBN 978-3-643-90719-6.
- Pike, Francis (2011). Empires at War: A Short History of Modern Asia Since World War II. I.B. Tauris. ISBN 978-0-85773-029-9.
- Protected Areas and Development Partnership (2003). Review of Protected Areas and Development in the Four Countries of the Lower Mekong River Region. ICEM. ISBN 978-0-9750332-4-1.
- Rabett, Ryan J. (2012). Human Adaptation in the Asian Palaeolithic: Hominin Dispersal and Behaviour During the Late Quaternary. Cambridge University Press. ISBN 978-1-107-01829-7.
- Ramsay, Jacob (2008). Mandarins and Martyrs: The Church and the Nguyen Dynasty in Early Nineteenth-century Vietnam. Stanford University Press. ISBN 978-0-8047-7954-8.
- Richardson, John (1876). A school manual of modern geography. Physical and political. Publisher not identified.
- Sharma, Gitesh (2009). Traces of Indian Culture in Vietnam. Rajkamal Prakashan. ISBN 978-81-905401-4-8.
- Smith, Anthony L. (2005). Southeast Asia and New Zealand: A History of Regional and Bilateral Relations. Victoria University Press. ISBN 978-0-86473-519-5.
- Smith, T. (2007). Britain and the Origins of the Vietnam War: UK Policy in Indo-China, 1943–50. Palgrave Macmillan UK. ISBN 978-0-230-59166-0.
- Taylor, Keith Weller (1983). The Birth of Vietnam. University of California Press. ISBN 978-0-520-04428-9.
- Thai Nguyen, Van; Mung Nguyen, Van (1958). A Short History of Viet-Nam. Vietnamese-American Association.
- Thaker, Aruna; Barton, Arlene (2012). Multicultural Handbook of Food, Nutrition and Dietetics. John Wiley & Sons. ISBN 978-1-118-35046-1.
- Thanh Hai, Do (2016). Vietnam and the South China Sea: Politics, Security and Legality. Taylor & Francis. ISBN 978-1-317-39820-2.
- Tonnesson, Stein; Antlov, Hans (1996). Asian Forms of the Nation. Routledge. ISBN 978-0-7007-0442-2.
- Tonnesson, Stein (2011). Vietnam 1946: How the War Began. University of California Press. ISBN 978-0-520-26993-4.
- Tran, Anh Q. (2017). Gods, Heroes, and Ancestors: An Interreligious Encounter in Eighteenth-Century Vietnam. Vol. 1. Oxford University Press. doi:10.1093/oso/9780190677602.001.0001. ISBN 978-0-19-067760-2. Archived from the original on 26 September 2019.
- Tran, Nhung Tuyet; Reid, Anthony, eds. (2006). Viet Nam: Borderless Histories. University of Wisconsin Press. ISBN 978-0-299-21773-0.
- Tran, Nu-Anh (2022). Disunion: Anticommunist Nationalism and the Making of the Republic of Vietnam. University of Hawaiʻi Press. ISBN 978-0-8248-8786-5. Archived from the original on 19 May 2022.
- Tran, Tri C.; Le, Tram (2017). Vietnamese Stories for Language Learners: Traditional Folktales in Vietnamese and English Text (MP3 Downloadable Audio Included). Tuttle Publishing. ISBN 978-1-4629-1956-7.
- Tran, Tu Binh (1985). David G. Marr (ed.). The Red Earth: A Vietnamese Memoir of Life on a Colonial Rubber Plantation. Southeast Asia Series. Translated by John Spragens, Jr. Athens, Ohio: Ohio University Press. ISBN 978-0-896-80119-6.
- Travel, DK (2017). DK Eyewitness Travel Guide Vietnam and Angkor Wat. Dorling Kindersley. ISBN 978-0-241-30136-4.
- Trieu Dan, Nguyen (2017). A Vietnamese Family Chronicle: Twelve Generations on the Banks of the Hat River. McFarland Publishing. ISBN 978-0-7864-8779-0.
- Tucker, Spencer C. (2011). The Encyclopedia of the Vietnam War: A Political, Social, and Military History [4 volumes] (2nd ed.). ABC-CLIO. ISBN 978-1-85109-961-0.
- Turner, Robert F. (1975). Vietnamese communism, its origins and development. Hoover Institution Press, Stanford University. ISBN 978-0-8179-6431-3.
- van Dijk, Ruud; Gray, William Glenn; Savranskaya, Svetlana; Suri, Jeremi; et al. (2013). Encyclopedia of the Cold War. Routledge. ISBN 978-1-135-92311-2.
- Vierra, Kimberly; Vierra, Brian (2011). Vietnam Business Guide: Getting Started in Tomorrow's Market Today. John Wiley & Sons. ISBN 978-1-118-17881-2.
- Vo, Nghia M. (2011). Saigon: A History. McFarland & Company. ISBN 978-0-7864-8634-2.
- Vo, Nghia M. (2012). Legends of Vietnam: An Analysis and Retelling of 88 Tales. McFarland & Company. ISBN 978-0-7864-9060-8.
- Vu, Tu Lap (1979). Vietnam: Geographical Data. Foreign Languages Publishing House.
- Waite, James (2012). The End of the First Indochina War: A Global History. Routledge. ISBN 978-1-136-27334-6.
- Willbanks, James H. (2013). Vietnam War Almanac: An In-Depth Guide to the Most Controversial Conflict in American History. Skyhorse Publishing. ISBN 978-1-62636-528-5.
- Woods, L. Shelton (2002). Vietnam: a global studies handbook. ABC-CLIO. ISBN 978-1-57607-416-9.
- Yao, Alice (2016). The Ancient Highlands of Southwest China: From the Bronze Age to the Han Empire. Oxford University Press. ISBN 978-0-19-936734-4.
- Yue Hashimoto, Oi-kan (1972). Phonology of Cantonese. Cambridge University Press. ISBN 978-0-521-08442-0.
- Zhu, Ying; Ren, Shuang; Collins, Ngan; Warner, Malcolm (2017). Business Leaders and Leadership in Asia. Taylor & Francis. ISBN 978-1-317-56749-3.

=== Legislation and government ===
- Anh, Van (2018). "Vietnam and Netherlands reaffirm economic relations". Vietnam Investment Review – vir. Archived from the original on 16 January 2019.
- Fong-Sam, Yolanda (2010). "2010 Minerals Yearbook" (PDF). United States Geological Survey. Archived from the original (PDF) on 2 March 2013.
- Garamone, Jim (2016). "Lifting Embargo Allows Closer U.S., Vietnam Cooperation, Obama, Carter Say". United States Department of Defense. Archived from the original on 16 October 2018.
- General Statistics Office of Vietnam (2019). "Completed Results of the 2019 Viet Nam Population and Housing Census" (PDF). Statistical Publishing House (Vietnam). ISBN 978-604-75-1532-5. Archived from the original on 10 January 2021.
- Green, Michael (2012). "Foreign policy and diplomatic representation". Te Ara: The Encyclopedia of New Zealand. Archived from the original on 16 October 2018.
- Nielsen, Chantal Pohl (2007). "Vietnam's Rice Policy: Recent Reforms and Future Opportunities" (PDF). Ministry of Agriculture and Rural Development. Vietnam. Archived from the original (PDF) on 5 October 2018.
- Taylor, Claire; Rutherford, Tom (2011). "Military Balance in Southeast Asia [Research Paper 11/79]" (PDF). House of Commons Library. Archived (PDF) from the original on 19 November 2018.
- Trung Chien, Tran Thi (2006). "Vietnam Health Report" (PDF). Ministry of Health. Vietnam. Archived from the original (PDF) on 9 October 2018.
- "Vietnamese general company of rubber-prospect of being a foremost Vietnamese agriculture group". AgroViet Newsletter. 2007. Archived from the original on 21 February 2008.
- "Annexe au procès-verbal de la séance du 1er octobre 1997". French Senate (in French). 1997. Archived from the original on 31 August 2013.
- "MEDIA RELEASE: The 2009 Population and Housing Census". General Statistics Office of Vietnam. 2009. Archived from the original on 13 November 2010.
- "Transport, Postal Services and Telecommunications". General Statistics Office of Vietnam. 2010. Archived from the original on 6 October 2018.
- "Monthly statistical information – Social and economic situation, 8 months of 2011 [Traffic accidents]". General Statistics Office of Vietnam. 2011. Archived from the original on 6 October 2018.
- "Overview on Vietnam geography". Government of Vietnam. Archived from the original on 30 November 2018.
- "About Vietnam (Political System)". Government of Vietnam. Archived from the original on 21 September 2013.
- "Minister Schultz signs agreement on water treatment project in Vietnam". Government of the Netherlands. 2016. Archived from the original on 16 January 2019.
- "Speech by Cora van Nieuwenhuizen, Minister of Infrastructure and Water Management, at the celebration of 45 years of bilateral relations with Vietnam, Hilton Hotel The Hague, 26 March 2018". Government of the Netherlands. 2018. Archived from the original on 16 January 2019.
- "UK aid helps clear lethal landmines in war-torn countries following generosity of British public". Government of the United Kingdom. 2017. Archived from the original on 16 October 2018.
- "UK trade with Vietnam – looking to the next 45 years". Government of the United Kingdom. 2018. Archived from the original on 26 October 2018.
- "An Overview of Spatial Policy in Asian and European Countries". Ministry of Land, Infrastructure, Transport and Tourism. Japan. Archived from the original on 18 April 2018.
- "Vietnam [The Full Picture of Vietnam]" (PDF). Ministry of Citizenship and Immigration. Canada. 2013. Archived from the original (PDF) on 11 October 2018.
- "Russia and Vietnam draft International Military Activity Plan 2020". Ministry of Defence. Russia. 2018. Archived from the original on 16 October 2018.
- "Vietnam Foreign Policy". Ministry of Foreign Affairs. Vietnam. 2007. Archived from the original on 18 January 2009.
- "General Information about Countries and Regions [List of countries which maintains diplomatic relations with the Socialist Republic of Vietnam (as April 2010)]". Ministry of Foreign Affairs. Vietnam. 2013. Archived from the original on 16 November 2017.
- "Continue moving forward with intensive international integration". Ministry of Foreign Affairs. Vietnam. 2014. Archived from the original on 16 October 2018.
- "Vietnam and International Organisations". Ministry of Foreign Affairs. Vietnam. 2018. Archived from the original on 26 July 2008.
- "Constitution of Vietnam". 1992. Archived from the original on 13 October 2018 – via Ministry of Justice (Vietnam).
- "Penal Code (No. 15/1999/QH10)". Ministry of Justice. Vietnam. 1999. Archived from the original on 2 October 2013.
- "Law on Publication (No. 30/2004/QH11)". Ministry of Justice. Vietnam. 2004. Archived from the original on 18 December 2011.
- "Ordinance of Beliefs and Religion [No. 21]". Ministry of Justice. Vietnam. 2004. Archived from the original on 14 October 2018.
- "Bộ Luật Lao Động (No. 10/2012/QH13)". Ministry of Justice (in Vietnamese). Vietnam. 2012. Archived from the original on 16 October 2018.
- "Báo cáo Hiện trạng môi trường quốc gia 2005 Chuyên đề Đa dạng sinh học". Ministry of Natural Resources and Environment (in Vietnamese). Vietnam. Archived from the original on 23 February 2009.
- "Key ingredients: Vietnamese". Special Broadcasting Service. Australia. 2013. Archived from the original on 15 October 2018.
- "Environmental Remediation [Agent Orange]". United States Agency for International Development. 3 December 2018. Archived from the original on 20 October 2018.
- "International Religious Freedom Report 2006". United States Department of State. 2005. Archived from the original on 11 April 2022.
- "U.S. Humanitarian Mine Action Programs: Asia". United States Department of State. 2006. Archived from the original on 18 April 2020.
- "Nha Trang city: Vietnamese cultural cuisine festival 2014 opens". Vietnam Culture Information Network. 2014. Archived from the original on 16 October 2018.
- "Contract signed for feasibility study for Long Thanh airport". Vietnam Investment Review – vir. 2018. Archived from the original on 7 October 2018.
- "Conquering the Fansipan". Vietnam National Administration of Tourism. 2014. Archived from the original on 2 October 2018.
- "International visitors to Viet Nam in December and 12 months of 2017". Vietnam National Administration of Tourism. 2018. Archived from the original on 8 January 2019.

=== Academic publications ===
- BirdLife International (2016). "Lophura edwardsi". The IUCN Red List of Threatened Species. doi:10.2305/IUCN.UK.2016-3.RLTS.T45354985A95145107.en.
- Amer, Ramses (1996). "Vietnam's Policies and the Ethnic Chinese since 1975". Sojourn: Journal of Social Issues in Southeast Asia. 11 (1) SJ11-1D: 76–104. doi:10.1355/SJ11-1D. JSTOR 41056928.
- Anh Dinh, Thuy (2016). The Causes and Effects of Korean Pop Culture on Vietnamese Consumer Behavior (PDF) (MA thesis). Thammasat University. Archived from the original (PDF) on 14 March 2023.
- Baccini, Leonardo; Impullitti, Giammario; Malesky, Edmund J. (2017). "Globalization and State Capitalism: Assessing Vietnam's Accession to the WTO". CESifo Working Paper Series. SSRN 3036319 – via Social Science Research Network.
- Banout, Jan; Urban, Ondrej; Musil, Vojtech; Szakova, Jirina; et al. (2014). "Agent Orange Footprint Still Visible in Rural Areas of Central Vietnam". Journal of Environmental and Public Health. 2014: 1–10. doi:10.1155/2014/528965. PMC 3930020. PMID 24639878.
- Berg, M; Stengel, C; Pham, TK; Pham, HV; et al. (2007). "Magnitude of arsenic pollution in the Mekong and Red River Deltas—Cambodia and Vietnam". Science of the Total Environment. 372 (2–3): 413–25. Bibcode:2007ScTEn.372..413B. doi:10.1016/j.scitotenv.2006.09.010. PMID 17081593.
- Chapman, Bruce; Liu, Amy Y.C. (2013). "Repayment Burdens of Student Loans for Vietnamese Higher Education". Crawford School Research Paper. SSRN 2213076 – via Social Science Research Network.
- Cira, Dean; Dastur, Arish; Kilroy, Austin; Lozano, Nancy; et al. (2011). Vietnam Urbanization Review (Report). World Bank. doi:10.13140/2.1.5100.6249 – via ResearchGate.
- "Rice in Vietnamese Culture and Economy". Mario Einaudi Center for International Studies – Southeast Asia Program. 25 September 2023. Archived from the original on 16 October 2018.
- Crook, Joe (2014). "Traveling Through Space: A Look at the Evolution of Transportation in Vietnam and its Implications". Independent Study Project (ISP) Collection. Archived from the original on 6 October 2018 – via SIT Digital Collections.
- Crozier, Brian (1955). "The Diem Regime in Southern Vietnam". Far Eastern Survey. 24 (4): 49–56. doi:10.2307/3023970. JSTOR 3023970.
- Cuong Le, Duc; Kubo, Tatsuhiko; Fujino, Yoshihisa; Minh Pham, Truong; et al. (2010). "Health Care System in Vietnam: Current Situation and Challenges". Asian Pacific Journal of Disease Management. 4 (2). Archived from the original on 5 October 2018 – via J-STAGE.
- Dang Vu, Hoai Nam; Nielsen, Martin Reinhardt (2018). "Understanding utilitarian and hedonic values determining the demand for rhino horn in Vietnam". Human Dimensions of Wildlife. 23 (5): 417–432. Bibcode:2018HDW....23..417D. doi:10.1080/10871209.2018.1449038. S2CID 46933047 – via Taylor & Francis.
- Endres, Kirsten W. (2001). "Local Dynamics of Renegotiating Ritual Space in Northern Vietnam: The Case of the "Dinh"". Journal of Social Issues in Southeast Asia. 16 (1) SJ16-1C: 70–101. doi:10.1355/sj16-1c. JSTOR 41057051. PMID 19195125.
- Feinberg, Richard E. (2016). "Principles and Power". Problems of Post-Communism. 63 (2): 75–83. doi:10.1080/10758216.2015.1083377. S2CID 156148830 – via Taylor & Francis.
- Fraser, SE (1980). "Vietnam's first census". POPLINE. 8 (8). Intercom: 326–331. Archived from the original on 16 October 2018.
- Freeman, Nick J. (2002). "United States's economic sanctions against Vietnam: International business and development repercussions". The Columbia Journal of World Business. 28 (2): 12–22. doi:10.1016/0022-5428(93)90038-Q. PMID 27044521.
- Gallup, John Luke (2002). "The wage labour market and inequality in Viet Nam in the 1990s". Policy Research Working Paper Series, World Bank. Policy Research Working Papers. doi:10.1596/1813-9450-2896. hdl:10986/19272. S2CID 18598221. Archived from the original on 8 May 2019 – via Research Papers in Economics.
- Goodkind, Daniel (1995). "Rising Gender Inequality in Vietnam Since Reunification". Pacific Affairs. 68 (3): 342–359. doi:10.2307/2761129. JSTOR 2761129.
- Greenfield, Gerard (1994). "The Development of Capitalism in Vietnam". Socialist Register. Archived from the original on 30 September 2018.
- Grigoreva, Nina V. (2014). "Legendary Ancestors, National Identity, and the Socialization of Children in Contemporary Vietnam" (PDF). Centre for Asian and African Studies. Archived from the original (PDF) on 15 October 2018.
- H. Dang, Hai-Anh; Glewwe, Paul W. (2017). "Well Begun, but Aiming Higher: A Review of Vietnam's Education Trends in the Past 20 Years and Emerging Challenges" (PDF). The Journal of Development Studies. 54 (7): 1171–1195. doi:10.1080/00220388.2017.1380797. hdl:10986/27610. PMC 6010051. PMID 29937575. Archived from the original (PDF) on 5 October 2018 – via Research on Improving Systems of Education.
- Ha Tran, Thi Thai (2014). "Education financing in Vietnam". Revue Internationale d'Éducation de Sèvres. doi:10.4000/ries.3895. S2CID 129299111. Archived from the original on 18 October 2018 – via OpenEdition Journals.
- Higham, C.F.W. (1984). "Prehistoric Rice Cultivation in Southeast Asia". Scientific American. 250 (4): 138–149. Bibcode:1984SciAm.250d.138H. doi:10.1038/scientificamerican0484-138. JSTOR 24969352.
- Hirschman, Charles; Preston, Samuel; Manh Loi, Vu (1995). "Vietnamese Casualties During the American War: A New Estimate". Population and Development Review. 21 (4): 783–812. doi:10.2307/2137774. JSTOR 2137774.
- Hoang Vuong, Quan; Dung Tran, Tri (2009). "The Cultural Dimensions of the Vietnamese Private Entrepreneurship". The IUP Journal of Entrepreneurship Development. SSRN 1442384 – via Social Science Research Network.
- Hong Phuong, Nguyen (2012). "Seismic Hazard Studies in Vietnam" (PDF). GEM Semi-Annual Meeting – Academia Sinica. Archived from the original (PDF) on 10 October 2018 – via Taiwan Earthquake Research Center.
- Hong Truong, Son; Ye, Qinghua; Stive, Marcel J. F. (2017). "Estuarine Mangrove Squeeze in the Mekong Delta, Vietnam". Journal of Coastal Research. 33 (4): 747–763. Bibcode:2017JCRes..33..747T. doi:10.2112/JCOASTRES-D-16-00087.1. S2CID 131892649 – via BioOne.
- Huu Chiem, Nguyen (1993). "Geo-Pedological Study of the Mekong Delta" (PDF). Southeast Asian Studies. 31 (2). Archived from the original (PDF) on 2 October 2018 – via Kyoto University.
- Huu Duc, Nguyen; Mai Hoa, Duong Thi; Thien Huong, Nguyen; Ngoc Bao, Nguyen (2013). "On Various Essential Data Related to Status Quo of Motorcycles in Vietnam". Journal of the Eastern Asia Society for Transportation Studies. 10. Archived from the original on 6 October 2018 – via J-STAGE.
- Kim Phuong, Tran (2014). "Vietnam: Highland bauxite Projects and initial economic effects". Vietnam Institute of Geosciences and Mineral Resources. Archived from the original on 4 October 2018 – via Metal Bulletin.
- Kimura, Tetsusaburo (1986). "Vietnam—Ten Years of Economic Struggle". Asian Survey. 26 (10): 1039–1055. doi:10.2307/2644255. JSTOR 2644255.
- Lieberman, Samuel S.; Wagstaff, Adam (2009). Health financing and delivery in Vietnam. World Bank. ISBN 978-0-8213-7782-6.
- Linh Le, Thi Phuong; Anh Trinh, Tu (2016). "Encouraging Public Transport Use to Reduce Traffic Congestion and Air Pollutant: A Case Study of Ho Chi Minh City, Vietnam". Procedia Engineering. 142: 236–243. doi:10.1016/j.proeng.2016.02.037.
- Manyin, Mark E. (2005). "U.S. Assistance to Vietnam" (PDF). CRS Report for Congress. Archived from the original (PDF) on 9 October 2018 – via Federation of American Scientists.
- Matsumura, Hirofumi; Lan Cuong, Nguyen; Kim Thuy, Nguyen; Anezaki, Tomoko (2001). "Dental Morphology of the Early Hoabinian, the Neolithic Da But and the Metal Age Dong Son Civilized Peoples in Vietnam". Zeitschrift für Morphologie und Anthropologie. 83 (1): 59–73. doi:10.1127/zma/83/2001/59. JSTOR 25757578. PMID 11372468.
- Matsumura, Hirofumi; Yoneda, Minoru; Yukio, Dodo; Oxenham, Marc; et al. (2008). "Terminal Pleistocene human skeleton from Hang Cho Cave, northern Vietnam: implications for the biological affinities of Hoabinhian people". Anthropological Science. 116 (3): 201–217. doi:10.1537/ase.070416. Archived from the original (PDF) on 24 September 2018 – via J-STAGE.
- McLeod, Mark W.; Thi Dieu, Nguyen (2001). Culture and Customs of Vietnam. Culture and Customs of Asia. Greenwood Press. ISBN 978-0-313-30485-9. ISSN 1097-0738.
- Meacham, William (1996). "Defining the Hundred Yue". Bulletin of the Indo-Pacific Prehistory Association. 15: 93–100. doi:10.7152/bippa.v15i0.11537 (inactive 13 September 2026).
- Merola, R. B.; Hien, T. T.; Quyen, D. T. T.; Vengosh, A. (2014). "Arsenic exposure to drinking water in the Mekong Delta". Science of the Total Environment. 511: 544–552. Bibcode:2015ScTEn.511..544M. doi:10.1016/j.scitotenv.2014.12.091. PMID 25585157.
- Miguel, Edward; Roland, Gérard (2005). "The Long Run Impact of Bombing Vietnam" (PDF). University of California, Berkeley. Archived from the original (PDF) on 3 October 2018.
- Minh Hoang, Truong; van Lap, Nguyen; Kim Oanh, Ta Thi; Jiro, Takemura (2016). "The influence of delta formation mechanism on geotechnical property sequence of the late Pleistocene–Holocene sediments in the Mekong River Delta". Heliyon. 2 (11) e00165. Bibcode:2016Heliy...200165H. doi:10.1016/j.heliyon.2016.e00165. PMC 5114594. PMID 27882357.
- Moise, Edwin E. (1988). "Nationalism and Communism in Vietnam". Journal of Third World Studies. 5 (2). University Press of Florida: 6–22. JSTOR 45193059.
- Momoki, Shiro (1996). "A Short Introduction to Champa Studies" (PDF). Kyoto University Research Information Repository. Archived from the original (PDF) on 18 October 2018 – via CORE.
- Nang Chung, Trinh; Giang Hai, Nguyen (2017). "Dong Son Culture in First Ten Centuries AD". Institute of Archaeology, Vietnam Academy of Social Sciences. Archived from the original on 18 October 2018.
- Nasuchon, Nopparat (2008). "Coastal Management and Community Management in Malaysia, Vietnam, Cambodia and Thailand, with a case study of Thai Fisheries Management" (PDF). United Nations-Nippon Foundation Fellow Research Presentation. Archived from the original (PDF) on 2 October 2018 – via United Nations.
- Nguyen, Lan Cuong (1985). "Two early Hoabinhian crania from Thanh Hoa Province, Vietnam". Zeitschrift für Morphologie und Anthropologie. 77 (1): 11–17. doi:10.1127/zma/77/1987/11. JSTOR 25757211. PMID 3564631.
- Nhu Nguyen, Quynh Thi (2016). "The Vietnamese Values System: A Blend of Oriental, Western and Socialist Values" (PDF). International Education Studies. 9 (12). Archived from the original (PDF) on 15 October 2018 – via Institute of Education Sciences.
- Norman, Jerry; Mei, Tsu-lin (1976). "The Austroasiatics in Ancient South China: Some Lexical Evidence". Monumenta Serica. 32: 274–301. doi:10.1080/02549948.1976.11731121.
- Obermeyer, Ziad; Murray, Christopher J L; Gakidou, Emmanuela (2008). "Fifty years of violent war deaths from Vietnam to Bosnia: analysis of data from the world health survey programme [Table 3]". BMJ. 336 (7659): 1482–6. doi:10.1136/bmj.a137. PMC 2440905. PMID 18566045.
- Odell, Andrew L.; Castillo, Marlene F. (2008). "Vietnam in a Nutshell: An Historical, Political and Commercial Overview" (PDF). NYBSA International Law Practicum. 21 (2). Archived from the original (PDF) on 12 October 2018 – via Duane Morris.
- Overland, Indra (2017). "Impact of Climate Change on ASEAN International Affairs: Risk and Opportunity Multiplier". Norwegian Institute of International Affairs (NUPI) and Myanmar Institute of International and Strategic Studies (MISIS). ISSN 1894-650X – via ResearchGate.
- Pham, Alice (2015). "The Vietnam Telecommunications Sector: Good Practices in Regulatory Reform in Relation to Competition Policy & Law Issues" (PDF). CUTS International. Archived from the original (PDF) on 25 February 2019.
- Pincus, Jonathan (2015). "Why Doesn't Vietnam Grow Faster?: State Fragmentation and the Limits of Vent for Surplus Growth" (PDF). Southeast Asian Economies. 32 (1): 26. doi:10.1355/ae32-1c. S2CID 154680467. Archived from the original (PDF) on 17 October 2018 – via Flanders Investment and Trade.
- Quach-Langlet, Tâm (1991). "Charles Fourniau: Annam-Tonkin 1885–1896. Lettrés et paysans vietnamiens face à la conquête coloniale. Travaux du Centre d'Histoire et Civilisations de la péninsule Indochinoise". Bulletin de l'École Française d'Extrême-Orient (in French). 78. Archived from the original on 3 March 2019 – via Persée.
- Quang Vinh, Bui. "Vietnam 2035: Toward Prosperity, Creativity, Equity, and Democracy" (PDF). George Washington University. Archived from the original (PDF) on 17 October 2018.
- Reilly, Brett (2018). The Origins of the Vietnamese Civil War and the State of Vietnam (PhD). University of Wisconsin–Madison. Archived from the original on 11 June 2025.
- Riehl, Herbert; Augstein, Ernst (1973). "Surface interaction calculations over the Gulf of Tonkin". Tellus. 25 (5): 424–434. Bibcode:1973Tell...25..424R. doi:10.3402/tellusa.v25i5.9694.
- Shaofei, YE; Guoqing, Zhang (2016). "The relationship between Nanyue and Annam in the ancient historical records of China and Vietnam". Honghe Prefecture Center for Vietnamese Studies, Honghe University. Archived from the original on 16 October 2018 – via CNKI Journal Translation Project.
- Sohr, Alexander; Brockfeld, Elmar; Sauerlander, Anke; Melde, Eric (2016). "Traffic Information System for Hanoi". Procedia Engineering. 142: 221–228. doi:10.1016/j.proeng.2016.02.035.
- Thayer, Carlyle A. (1994). "Sino-Vietnamese Relations: The Interplay of Ideology and National Interest". Asian Survey. 34 (6): 513–528. doi:10.2307/2645338. JSTOR 2645338.
- Thomas, Martin (2012). Rubber, coolies and communists: In Violence and Colonial Order: Police, Workers and Protest in the European Colonial Empires, 1918–1940 (Critical Perspectives on Empire from Part II – Colonial case studies: French, British and Belgian). pp. 141–176. doi:10.1017/CBO9781139045643.009. ISBN 978-1-139-04564-3.
- Tran, Nu-Anh (2023). "Denouncing the 'Việt Cộng': Tales of revolution and betrayal in the Republic of Vietnam". Journal of Southeast Asian Studies. 53 (4): 686–708. doi:10.1017/S0022463422000790.
- Trinh, Q. M.; Nguyen, H. L.; Do, T. N.; Nguyen, V. N.; et al. (2016). "Tuberculosis and HIV co-infection in Vietnam". International Journal of Infectious Diseases. 46 (2): 12–22. doi:10.1016/0022-5428(93)90038-Q. PMID 27044521.
- Truong, Ngân (2018). "Solid Waste Management in Vietnam" (PDF). Degree Programme in Environmental Engineering. Archived from the original (PDF) on 8 January 2019.
- Truong, Nhu; Vo, Dang H.; Nguyen, Dzung (2018). Mekong State of Land (PDF). University of Bern. Archived from the original (PDF) on 6 October 2018.
- Tung Hieu, Ly (2015). "Confucian Influences on Vietnamese Culture". Vietnam Social Sciences. 5 (169). Archived from the original on 15 October 2018 – via Vietnam Journals Online.
- Van De, Nguyen; Douglas, Ian; McMorrow, Julia; Lindley, Sarah; et al. (2008). "Erosion and Nutrient Loss on Sloping Land under Intense Cultivation in Southern Vietnam". Geographical Research. 46 (1): 4–16. Bibcode:2008GeoRs..46....4V. doi:10.1111/j.1745-5871.2007.00487.x. S2CID 128887874. Archived from the original on 18 April 2021.
- Van Hoang, Chung (2017). "Evangelizing Post-Đổi Mới Vietnam: The Rise of Protestantism and the State's Response" (PDF). Perspective (34). ISEAS–Yusof Ishak Institute. ISSN 2335-6677. Archived from the original (PDF) on 14 October 2018.
- Van Nam, Nguyen; de Vries, Peter J.; Van Toi, Le; Nagelkerke, Nico (2005). "Malaria control in Vietnam: the Binh Thuan experience". Tropical Medicine & International Health. 10 (4): 357–365. doi:10.1111/j.1365-3156.2005.01387.x. PMID 15807800. S2CID 22083432.
- Van Tho, Tran (2003). "Economic development in Vietnam during the second half of the 20th century: How to avoid the danger of lagging behind" (PDF). The Vietnamese Economy: Awakening the Dorming Dragon (2). Archived from the original (PDF) on 5 October 2018 – via Waseda University.
- Van Van, Hoang. "The Current Situation and Issues of the Teaching of English in Vietnam" (PDF). 立命館言語文化研究. 22 (1). Archived from the original (PDF) on 12 October 2018.
- Viet Trung, Le; Quoc Viet, Tran; Van Chat, Pham (2016). "An Overview of Vietnam's Oil and Gas Industry" (PDF). Petroleum Economics & Management. 10. Archived from the original (PDF) on 10 October 2018 – via Vietnam Petroleum Institute.
- Wagstaff, Adam; van Doorslaer, Eddy; Watanabe, Naoko (2003). "On decomposing the causes of health sector inequalities with an application to malnutrition inequalities in Vietnam" (PDF). Journal of Econometrics. 112 (1): 207–223. doi:10.1016/S0304-4076(02)00161-6. hdl:10986/19426. S2CID 122165846. Archived (PDF) from the original on 14 September 2015.
- Wai-ming, Ng (2002). "The Impact of Japanese Comics and Animation in Asia" (PDF). Journal of Japanese Trade & Industry. Archived (PDF) from the original on 16 October 2018 – via Chinese University of Hong Kong.
- Wilkey, Robert Neil (2002). "Vietnam's Antitrust Legislation and Subscription to E-ASEAN: An End to the Bamboo Firewall Over Internet Regulation". The John Marshall Journal of Information Technology and Privacy Law. 20 (4). Archived from the original on 19 November 2018.
- Xuan Dinh, Quan (2000). "The Political Economy of Vietnam's Transformation Process". Contemporary Southeast Asia. 22 (2) CS22-2g: 360–388. doi:10.1355/CS22-2G. JSTOR 25798497.
- Zinoman, Peter (2000). "Colonial Prisons and Anti-Colonial Resistance in French Indochina: The Thai Nguyen Rebellion, 1917". Modern Asian Studies. 34 (1): 57–98. doi:10.1017/S0026749X00003590. JSTOR 313112. S2CID 145191678.
- Zuckerman, Phil (2007). "Atheism: Contemporary Rates and Patterns" ( (PDF)). Cambridge Companion to Atheism. Archived from the original on 12 June 2009 – via Pitzer College.

=== News and magazines ===
- Anh, Lan (2016a). "Ba Be, the biggest mountain lake in Vietnam". Voice of Vietnam. Archived from the original on 15 January 2019.
- Anh, Lan (2016b). "Vietnamese family reunion during Tet". Voice of Vietnam. Archived from the original on 16 October 2018.
- Batruny, Joe (2014). "20 Vietnamese dishes and drinks you need to try". Matador Network. Archived from the original on 16 October 2018.
- Borel, Brooke (2010). "A Ping-Pong-Playing Terminator". Popular Science. Archived from the original on 3 March 2019.
- Brown, Vanessa (2018). "Dark side of Vietnam reveals cost of war". news.com.au. Archived from the original on 16 October 2018.
- Buleen, Chad (2017). "Average Temperature in Vietnam". USA Today. Archived from the original on 16 October 2018.
- Cerre, Mike (2016). "Agent Orange's legacy continues to haunt Vietnam and Veterans". KABC-TV. Archived from the original on 16 October 2018.
- Chi, Kim (2017). "Vietnam builds north-south highway, but not a railway". Vietnam Net. Archived from the original on 16 October 2018.
- Chin, Stephen (2018). "Vietnam plays catch up with high speed rail". The ASEAN Post. Archived from the original on 16 October 2018.
- Clark, Helen; Miller, Karryn (2017). "Vietnamese food: 40 delicious dishes you'll love". CNN Travel. Archived from the original on 16 October 2018.
- Cockburn, Patrick (1994). "US finally ends Vietnam embargo". The Independent. Archived from the original on 20 February 2020.
- Corapi, Annie (2010). "The 10 healthiest ethnic cuisines". CNN Health. Archived from the original on 1 October 2018.
- Dall, Nick (2017). "How Vietnam learned to stop poaching and love its beasts". Ozy. Archived from the original on 16 October 2018.
- Duy, Dinh (2016). "The Revival of Boléro in Vietnam". The Diplomat. Archived from the original on 15 October 2018.
- Giap, Trong (2017). "Vietnam signs global treaty to ban nuclear weapons". VnExpress. Archived from the original on 13 August 2019.
- Gillet, Kit (2011). "Riding Vietnam's Ho Chi Minh trail". The Guardian. Archived from the original on 12 April 2016.
- Gomes, Alaric (2019). "Asian Cup: Vietnam continue to chase their dream with quarters berth". Gulf News. Archived from the original on 6 February 2019.
- Ha, K. Oanh; Giang, Nguyen Kieu; Denslow, Neil (2012). "Vietnam Air Aims to Win Southeast Asia's No. 2 Title by 2020". Bloomberg L.P. Archived from the original on 29 October 2013.
- Haberman, Clyde (12 May 2014). "Agent Orange's Long Legacy, for Vietnam and Veterans". The New York Times. Archived from the original on 24 July 2017.
- Hirano, Ko (2016). "Japanese language studies taking root in Vietnam elementary schools". The Japan Times Online. The Japan Times. Archived from the original on 16 October 2018.
- Huong, Minh (2010). "Folk poetry preservation a labour of love". Việt Nam News. Archived from the original on 16 October 2018.
- Hutt, David (13 July 2020). "US, Vietnam ties have never been better". Asia Times. Archived from the original on 18 April 2021.
- Kinver, Mark (2011). "Javan rhino 'now extinct in Vietnam'". BBC News. Archived from the original on 13 March 2024.
- Loan, Doan (2018). "Vietnam's 2019 holiday plan includes 9-day Tet break". VnExpress. Archived from the original on 16 October 2018.
- MacLeod, Calum (2012). "Fifty years later, U.S., Vietnam deal with Agent Orange". USA Today. Archived from the original on 16 October 2018.
- Mai, Thanh (2017). "Vietnam remains world's No 1 exporter of cashews". Vietnam Net. Archived from the original on 16 October 2018.
- McNeil, Donald G. Jr. (2016). "Vietnam's Battle With Tuberculosis". The New York Times. Archived from the original on 16 October 2018.
- Mitchell, Alison (12 July 1995). "Opening to Vietnam: The Overview; U.S. Grants Vietnam Full Ties; Time for Healing, Clinton Says". The New York Times. Archived from the original on 16 October 2018.
- Mydans, Seth (24 December 2009). "Vietnam Charges Lawyer With Capital Crime". The New York Times. Archived from the original on 6 April 2019.
- Nghia, Son; Luan, Nguyen (2017). "Unique Fighting-Cock Martial Arts". Báo Ảnh Việt Nam. Archived from the original on 16 October 2018.
- Nguyen, Andrea (2011). "Heaven in a Bowl: The Original *Pho*". Saveur. Archived from the original on 3 March 2019.
- Nguyen, Mai; Binh Minh, Ho; Pham, My; Burmistrova, Svetlana; et al. (2016). "Vietnam abandons plan for first nuclear power plants". Reuters. Archived from the original on 16 October 2018.
- Norton, Barley (2015). "Ca Trù Singing in Vietnam". Smithsonian Folkways. Archived from the original on 19 November 2018.
- Pham, Hiep (2012). "Government's student loan scheme inadequate to ensure access". University World News. Archived from the original on 18 October 2018.
- Phuong, Lan (2018). "Jiyeon (T-ara) chủ động diễn cảnh tình cảm với Soobin Hoàng Sơn" [Jiyeon (T-ara) took the initiative to act out a love scene with Soobin Hoàng Son] (in Vietnamese). Zing.vn. Archived from the original on 9 January 2019.
- Phuong, Le (2012). "Vietnam's cultural integration seen by researchers". Voice of Vietnam. Archived from the original on 3 March 2019.
- Pike, Matthew (2018). "11 Traditional Vietnamese Tết Dishes". Culture Trip. Archived from the original on 16 October 2018.
- Quy, Nguyen (2018). "Three Vietnam hotspots among 100 most visited cities". VnExpress.
- Raslan, Karim (2017). "How Vietnam's answer to Whatsapp, Zalo, began with a hack". South China Morning Post. Archived from the original on 16 October 2018.
- Rick, August (2018). "How Vietnamese Soccer Upset The Odds That China Is Banking On". Forbes. Archived from the original on 3 September 2018.
- Shenon, Philip (23 April 1995). "20 Years After Victory, Vietnamese Communists Ponder How to Celebrate". The New York Times. Archived from the original on 29 June 2019.
- Sims, Alexandra (2016). "Rio 2016: Vietnam wins first ever Olympic gold medal". The Independent. Archived from the original on 28 August 2017.
- Stewart, Phil (2018). "U.S. prepares for biggest-ever Agent Orange clean-up in Vietnam". Reuters. Archived from the original on 20 October 2018.
- Summers, Chris (2014). "How Vietnam became a coffee giant". BBC News. Archived from the original on 19 March 2018.
- Tatarski, Michael (2017). "Vietnam's tale of two metros, one built by the Japanese and the other by the Chinese". South China Morning Post. Archived from the original on 16 October 2018.
- Terzian, Peter (2018). "The World's Top 15 Cities". Travel + Leisure. Archived from the original on 19 December 2018.
- Tiezzi, Shannon (2016). "It's Official: Formosa Subsidiary Caused Mass Fish Deaths in Vietnam". The Diplomat. Archived from the original on 8 January 2019.
- Tran, Bich T. (15 July 2020). "Will We See a US-Vietnam Strategic Partnership?". The Diplomat. Archived from the original on 18 April 2021.
- Van Thanh, Vo (2016). "Vietnam draws up danger-zone map of unexploded bombs". VnExpress. Archived from the original on 16 October 2018.
- Williams, Vicki (2017). "Why a Vietnamese food journey is sure to tantalise diners from north to south". South China Morning Post. Archived from the original on 16 October 2018.
- Yan, Sophia (2016). "Vietnam's defense spending is $5 billion and rising fast". CNNMoney. Archived from the original on 16 October 2018.
- Yan; Jun, Tao; Long, Bui (2018). "Feature: Football mania spreads after Vietnam makes history at Asiad". Xinhua News Agency. Archived from the original on 30 August 2018.
- AFP staff (2016). "The US is helping to clean up Agent Orange residue, 50 years since the Vietnam War". TheJournal.ie. Agence France-Presse. Archived from the original on 16 October 2018.
- BBC News (1997). "Vietnam: changing of the guard". BBC News. Archived from the original on 16 October 2018.
- BBC News (2005). "The legacy of Agent Orange". BBC News. Archived from the original on 19 July 2018.
- BBC News (2009). "Vietnam lawyer charged with subversion". BBC News. Archived from the original on 18 December 2019.
- BBC News (2018). "Vietnamese capital Hanoi asks people not to eat dog meat". BBC News. Archived from the original on 12 September 2018.
- China Daily (2008). "Vietnam win first int'l title". China Daily. Sina English. Archived from the original on 8 January 2019.
- DigInfo (2007). "TOSY TOPIO – Table Tennis Playing Robot". DigInfo. Archived from the original on 21 May 2009.
- FourFourTwo (2017). "The time has come for Vietnam to turn beautiful football into real success". FourFourTwo. Archived from the original on 16 October 2018.
- NHK World-Japan (2018). "Japan, Vietnam to launch dioxin cleanup project". NHK World-Japan. Archived from the original on 3 October 2018.
- Nikkei Asian Review. "Petrovietnam Gas JSC". Nikkei Asian Review. Archived from the original on 16 October 2018.
- Nikkei Asian Review (2018). "Vietnam's Agent Orange cleanup enlists Japanese tech". Nikkei Asian Review. Archived from the original on 16 October 2018.
- "Vietnam outlines collectivization goals". The Spokesman-Review. 1977. Archived from the original on 9 March 2021.
- Thanh Nien (2010). "Vietnam's 2010 growth fastest in three years". Thanh Niên. Archived from the original on 5 October 2018.
- Thanh Nien (2015). "Horrific photos recall Vietnamese Famine of 1945". Thanh Niên. Archived from the original on 31 October 2018.
- The Economic Times (2018). "Indian, Vietnamese armies hold first military exercise". The Economic Times. Archived from the original on 16 October 2018.
- The Economist (2008). "A bit of everything [Vietnam's quest for role models]". The Economist. Archived from the original on 21 October 2012.
- The Harvard Crimson (1972). "Med School Professor Praises North Vietnam's Medical Care". The Harvard Crimson. Archived from the original on 19 November 2018.
- The Japan Times (2009). "Vietnam opts for Japanese bullet trains". The Japan Times Online. The Japan Times. Archived from the original on 16 October 2018.
- The Japan Times (2015). "Japan defense vessel to stop at Vietnam naval base in South China Sea". The Japan Times. Archived from the original on 16 October 2018.
- The New York Times (3 July 1976). "2 Parts of Vietnam Officially Reunited; Leadership Chosen". The New York Times. Archived from the original on 16 February 2018.
- "Major Vietnam high speed railway to be elevated, tunnelled: draft report". The New York Times. 2018. Archived from the original on 1 July 2017.
- The Saigon Times Daily (2018). "Wild celebrations in Hanoi as Vietnam win regional title". The Saigon Times Daily. Archived from the original on 7 January 2019.
- The Telegraph. "In pictures: Inside Hang Son Doong, the world's largest caves in Vietnam". The Daily Telegraph. Archived from the original on 15 January 2019.
- The Telegraph (2012). "Vietnam begins naval exercises with the US". The Daily Telegraph. Archived from the original on 16 October 2018.
- Tuoi Tre News (2012). "Vietnam to be listed top economies by 2050: HSBC". Tuổi Trẻ. Archived from the original on 16 January 2012.
- UPI.com (2013). "Oil production starts offshore Vietnam". United Press International. Archived from the original on 16 October 2018.
- Viet Nam News (2012). "Top three telecoms control 95 per cent of market share". Việt Nam News. Archived from the original on 25 February 2019.
- Viet Nam News (2016). "Seismologists predict potential earthquakes". Việt Nam News. Archived from the original on 10 October 2018.
- "Tech, science spending too low". Việt Nam News. 2010. Archived from the original on 9 October 2018.
- "The constitution of the socialist republic of Viet Nam". Việt Nam News. 2014. Archived from the original on 1 May 2019.
- "Monsanto court ruling bolsters the hope for millions of Vietnamese Agent Orange victims". Việt Nam News. 2018a. Archived from the original on 5 October 2018.
- "US continues to be key export market for Việt Nam". Việt Nam News. 2018b. Archived from the original on 5 October 2018.
- "Water industry needs smart tech". Việt Nam News. 2018c. Archived from the original on 16 January 2019.
- "Water quality inspections to be held nationwide". Việt Nam News. 2018d. Archived from the original on 16 January 2019.
- "Rare photos of Vietnam's famine in 1945". Vietnam Net. 2015. Archived from the original on 16 October 2018.
- "Tourism contributes significantly to Vietnam's economy". Vietnam Net. Vietnam News Agency. 2016a. Archived from the original on 16 October 2018.
- "Decree on university autonomy in final stages". Vietnam Net. VN Economic Times. 2016b. Archived from the original on 16 October 2018.
- "Top 15 tourist attractions in Vietnam". Vietnam Net. Zing/Voice of Vietnam. 2017a. Archived from the original on 30 November 2018.
- "Northern mountain frozen as temperatures drop". Vietnam Net. Dân Trí News. 2018a. Archived from the original on 16 October 2018.
- "$58b for North–South high speed train: consultants". Vietnam Net. VNS. 2018b. Archived from the original on 16 October 2018.
- Vietnam+ (2008). "High speed railway engineers to be trained in Japan". Vietnam+. Archived from the original on 16 October 2018.
- Voice of Vietnam (2016). "Vietnam joins int'l naval exercise in Brunei and Singapore". Voice of Vietnam. Archived from the original on 3 March 2019.
- Voice of Vietnam (2018b). "Chief of General Staff of Lao People's Army visits Vietnam". Voice of Vietnam. Archived from the original on 3 March 2019.
- Voice of Vietnam (2018c). "Vietnam's pepper industry about to burst". Voice of Vietnam. Archived from the original on 5 October 2018.
- Voice of Vietnam (2018d). "Vietnam's folk music treasure promoted". Voice of Vietnam. Archived from the original on 9 January 2019.

=== Websites ===
- Bich Loan, Hoang Thi (2007). "Consistently pursuing the socialist orientation in developing the market economy in Vietnam". Ministry of Culture and Information (Vietnam). Communist Review. Archived from the original on 10 May 2011.
- Bielefeldt, Heiner (2014). "Press Statement on the visit to the Socialist Republic of Viet Nam by the Special Rapporteur on freedom of religion or belief". United Nations Special Rapporteur on Freedom of Religion or Belief. Office of the United Nations High Commissioner for Human Rights. Archived from the original on 13 October 2018.
- Chonchirdsin, Sud (2016). "Mythical creatures in Vietnamese culture". British Library. Archived from the original on 15 October 2018.
- Dallek, Matthew (2018). "How the Tet Offensive Shocked Americans into Questioning if the Vietnam War Could be Won". History. Archived from the original on 16 October 2018.
- Datta, Ajoy; Mendizabal, Enrique (2018). "Political and economic transition in Vietnam and its impact on think tank traditions". Medium. Archived from the original on 16 October 2018.
- Gallop, Annabel (2017). "Vietnam and Dragons". British Library. Archived from the original on 15 October 2018.
- Hoang Vuong, Quan (2014). "Vietnam's Political Economy in Transition (1986–2016)". Stratfor. Archived from the original on 16 October 2018.
- Hoang, Hai (2016). "[Listing Note] Riding the boom of passenger traffic growth" (PDF). Airports Corporation of Vietnam (ACV). Viet Capital Securities. Archived from the original (PDF) on 7 October 2018.
- Koppes, Steve (2010). "Ngô Bao Châu receives Fields Medal, highest honor in mathematics". University of Chicago. Archived from the original on 9 October 2018.
- Le, Thomas D. (2008). "Vietnamese Poetry". Le World. Archived from the original on 15 September 2009.
- McKinney, Brennan (2009). "The Human Migration: Homo Erectus and the Ice Age". Yahoo! Voices. Archived from the original on 12 November 2012.
- Nam Dang, Vu Hoai; Nielsen, Martin (2019). "We asked people in Vietnam why they use rhino horn. Here's what they said". Public Radio International. Archived from the original on 27 May 2019.
- Sagan, Ginetta; Denny, Stephen (1982). "Re-education in unliberated Vietnam: Loneliness, Suffering and Death". The Indochina Newsletter. University of California, Berkeley. Archived from the original on 28 April 2019.
- Thi Anh, Do. "Flood in Vietnam". Asian Disaster Preparedness Center. Archived from the original on 10 October 2018.
- Tran, Anh Q. (2018). "The Historiography of the Jesuits in Vietnam: 1615–1773 and 1957–2007". Brill. Archived from the original on 31 December 2019.
- Van Phuc, Vu (2014). "Reform policy of the Communist Party of Vietnam after nearly 30 years of renewal". Ministry of Culture and Information (Vietnam). Communist Review. Archived from the original on 29 September 2018.
- Vandemoortele, Milo; Bird, Kate (2010). "Viet Nam's Progress on Economic Growth and Poverty Reduction: Impressive improvements". Development Progress Stories. Archived from the original on 14 May 2011 – via Overseas Development Institute.
- Vandemoortele, Milo (2010). "The MDG fundamentals: improving equity for development". Overseas Development Institute. ODI Briefing Papers. Archived from the original on 15 May 2010.
- Vu, Tuong (2007). "Newly released documents on the land reform". Naval Postgraduate School. University of Washington Libraries. Archived from the original on 20 April 2011.
- South East Asia Iron and Steel Institute (2009). "Japan-Vietnam alliance to advise high-speed railway project". Thanh Niên. South East Asia Iron and Steel Institute. Archived from the original on 16 October 2018.
- Agent Orange Record. "Dealing With the Damage". Agent Orange Record. Archived from the original on 11 October 2018.
- Berkman Klein Center (2006). "OpenNet Initiative Vietnam Report: University Research Team Finds an Increase in Internet Censorship in Vietnam". Berkman Klein Center for Internet & Society. Archived from the original on 19 November 2018.
- British Business Group Vietnam (2017). "Vietnam Water Sector Briefing" (PDF). British Business Group Vietnam. Archived from the original (PDF) on 11 January 2019.
- CNRS (2010). "2010 Fields Medal awarded to mathematician Ngô Bao Châu". Centre national de la recherche scientifique. Archived from the original on 9 October 2018.
- Cultural Orientation Resource Centre. "The Montagnards – Culture Profile [Language and Literacy]" (PDF). Cultural Orientation Resource Center. Archived from the original (PDF) on 12 October 2018.
- Electricity of Vietnam (2017). "Vietnam Electricity [Annual Report]" (PDF). Electricity of Vietnam. Archived from the original (PDF) on 7 October 2018.
- Embassy of Vietnam in USA. "Government Structure". Embassy of the Socialist Republic of Vietnam in the United States of America. Archived from the original on 8 April 2018.
- History (2018). "U.S. withdraws from Vietnam [1973]". History. Archived from the original on 19 October 2018.
- Index Mundi (2016). "Vietnam – Improved water source (% of population with access)". Index Mundi. Archived from the original on 16 October 2018.
- Index Mundi (2018). "Waterways [km]". Index Mundi. Archived from the original on 16 October 2018.
- Intellasia (2010). "Huge hydro plant starts operation in Vietnam, says official". Intellasia. Archived from the original on 23 July 2011.
- International Olympic Committee (2018). "Vietnam". International Olympic Committee. Archived from the original on 29 October 2018.
- LM Report (2000). "Denmark Mine Removal Action Funding [Table 1. Governmental donations to mine action in calendar year 1999]". International Campaign to Ban Landmines. Archived from the original on 16 October 2018.
- Montagnard Human Rights Organisation. "Under South Vietnam Rule (1955–1975)". Montagnard Human Rights Organization. Archived from the original on 6 October 2012.
- OpenNet Initiative (2012). "Country Profiles [Vietnam]". OpenNet Initiative. Archived from the original on 26 September 2018.
- Oxford Business Group (2017). "Operators in Vietnam bolster infrastructure and introduce new products and services in telecoms sector". Oxford Business Group. Archived from the original on 25 February 2019.
- Reporters Without Borders. "Internet Enemies [Vietnam]". Reporters Without Borders. Archived from the original on 17 March 2011.
- UNESCO Intangible Cultural Heritage (2012). "Worship of Hùng kings in Phú Thọ". Intangible cultural heritage. UNESCO. Archived from the original on 15 October 2018.
- UNESCO Media Services (2016). "ASEAN Economic Community likely to spur scientific co-operation, says report". UNESCO. Archived from the original on 8 October 2018.
- UNESCO Publishing. "UNESCO Science Report: towards 2030" (PDF). UNESCO. Archived (PDF) from the original on 30 June 2017.
- UNESCO World Heritage Convention (1994). "Ha Long Bay". World Heritage Convention. UNESCO. Archived from the original on 28 November 2018.
- UNESCO World Heritage Convention (2003). "Phong Nha-Ke Bang National Park". World Heritage Convention. UNESCO. Archived from the original on 28 November 2018.
- UNICEF. "At a glance: Viet Nam [Statistics]". UNICEF. Archived from the original on 11 January 2008.
- UNICEF (2015). "Viet Nam [Sanitation]". UNICEF. Archived from the original on 11 January 2019.
- United Nations Department of Economic and Social Affairs. "Data Query". United Nations Department of Economic and Social Affairs. Archived from the original on 15 June 2020.
- United Nations Development Programme (2018). "Viet Nam: Mine Action Project launched with support from Korea". United Nations Development Programme. Archived from the original on 16 October 2018.
- United Nations Population Fund (2009). "Migration and Urbanization in Vietnam: Patterns, Trends and Differentials" (PDF). United Nations Population Fund Vietnam. Archived from the original (PDF) on 8 January 2019.
- United Nations Treaty Collection. "Treaty on the Prohibition of Nuclear Weapons [Vietnam]". United Nations Treaty Collection. Archived from the original on 6 August 2019.
- University of Technology Sydney (2018). "Hundreds of Vietnamese children access safe water". University of Technology Sydney. Archived from the original on 11 January 2019.
- Vietnam Academy of Science and Technology (2017). "Recent development and implementation plan 2017–2022 of Vietnam Space Center Project". Vietnam Academy of Science and Technology. Archived from the original on 8 October 2018.
- Vietnam National Space Centre (2016). "History of Establishment and Development [The period of 2016–2020]". Vietnam National Space Center. Archived from the original on 8 October 2018.
- Vietnam News Agency (2018). "China tops Vietnam's list of importers". VEN.vn. Archived from the original on 16 October 2018.
- Vietnam Women's Union (2005). "Vietnam set priorities for HIV/AIDS prevention in 2006". Vietnam Women's Union. Archived from the original on 9 October 2018.
- Vietnamese Waters Zone. "Catches by Taxon in the waters of Viet Nam". Sea Around Us. Archived from the original on 23 February 2016.
- Vietnamese-American Association. "Lạc Long Quân & Âu Cơ" (PDF). Vietnamese-American Association of Raleigh, North Carolina. Archived from the original (PDF) on 15 October 2018.
- Waitemata District Health Board (2015). "Vietnamese Culture" (PDF). Waitemata District Health Board, New Zealand. Archived from the original (PDF) on 9 January 2019.
- World Bank (2002). "Issues and Dynamics: Urban Systems in Developing East Asia" (PDF). Urbanization Dynamics and Policy Frameworks in Developing East Asia, East Asia Infrastructure Department. World Bank. Archived from the original (PDF) on 8 January 2019.
- World Bank (2013). "School enrollment, primary (% net)". World Bank. Archived from the original on 16 October 2018.
- World Bank (2015). "Progression to secondary school (%)". World Bank. Archived from the original on 16 October 2018.
- World Bank (2016b). "Life expectancy at birth, male (years)". World Bank. Archived from the original on 26 August 2018.
- World Bank (2018a). "Prevalence of HIV, total (% of population ages 15–49)". World Bank. Archived from the original on 16 October 2018.

=== Free content ===
This article incorporates text from a free content work. Licensed under CC BY-SA IGO 3.0. Text taken from UNESCO Science Report: towards 2030, 713–714, UNESCO, UNESCO Publishing.
This article incorporates public domain material from "(U.S. Relations With Vietnam)". U.S. Bilateral Relations Fact Sheets. United States Department of State.
