= 2019 Vietnamese census =

Fifth national census of reunified Vietnam

2019 Vietnam Population and Housing census
- 1 April 2019
- Cover of the published final report

General information
- Country: Vietnam
- Authority: General Statistics Office of Vietnam
- Website: tongdieutradanso.vn

Results
- Total population: 96,208,984 (▲1.14%/year)
- Most populous locality: Ho Chi Minh City (8,993,082)
- Least populous locality: Bắc Kạn Province (313,905)

The 2019 Vietnamese census, officially the 2019 Viet Nam Population and Housing Census (Vietnamese: Tổng điều tra dân số và nhà ở năm 2019, lit. 'Total investigation on the population and housing of the year 2019') was the fifth national census of Vietnam since the country's reunification, and the eighth census conducted by the General Statistics Office of Vietnam. Census work began on 1 April 2019, and the census response period ended on 25 April 2019. Involving 147,000 enumerators and almost 2 years of preparation, the 2019 census was the largest census up to that time in Vietnam, and was the first Vietnamese census to extensively use technology in all stages.

The census was conducted in all 63 of Vietnam's provinces and municipalities, along with three ministries: the Ministry of National Defence, the Ministry of Public Security and the Ministry of Foreign Affairs, with a total budget of about 1.1 trillion đồng. Besides collecting statistical information, the census aimed to inform the socio-economic development policies of the country and to monitor its sustainable development goals.

The preliminary results were released on 11 July 2019, while full results were published on 19 December. The census recorded a resident population of 96,208,984, an increase of 10.4 million people after 10 years; the growth rate was lower than the preceding decade and the sex ratio at birth was highly skewed towards boys.

== Background ==
In 1961, faced with a population growth rate of 4% and a fertility rate of more than 6 children per woman, the government of Vietnam issued a directive on controlled childbearing, making Vietnam one of the first countries in the region to impose state-mandated family planning. By 1975, the population growth rate had dropped to 2.4% and the average number of children per woman had fallen to 5.25. The state continued to encourage couples to avoid pregnancies and have only 1 to 2 children, except for some special cases.

By the beginning of the twenty-first century, population growth in Vietnam had slowed dramatically: in 2002, the completed fertility rate was 2.8 children per woman, and the growth rate was only 1.3% per year. In 2003 the government relaxed its childbearing controls, allowing couples to decide how many children to have and when and resulting in a renewed rise in the fertility rate. In 2009, due to the increased fertility rate, the government changed its policy to recommend that each couple have 1–2 children. Between 2010 and 2019, the average annual population growth rate decreased to roughly 1%. In 2011, the country officially entered the "aging phase".

During the Vietnam War, the General Statistics Office conducted censuses in 1960 and 1974 in the North. Following the reunification in 1976, a population census was conducted in the southern provinces. The first national census was conducted in 1979. After that, Vietnam conducted a census every 10 years, in 1989, 1999, and 2009.

== Purpose ==
The purpose of the census was to collect demographic information. The results were to be used for research, analysis and forecasting, in particular to help assess the implementation of the socio-economic development strategy, and monitor sustainable development goals. The results also provided an important basis for formulating and planning socio-economic development policies in the future. In addition, because the population data from the Ministry of Justice, Ministry of Public Security, and Ministry of Health were not detailed and accurate enough, the 2019 census also helped to update national population database and provided a basis for proposals to not conduct a census in 2029. The government also used the population data to adjust administrative boundaries.

== Design and questions ==
The census was conducted in 63 provinces and municipalities along with three ministries: the Ministry of National Defence, the Ministry of Public Security and the Ministry of Foreign Affairs, with a total budget of about 1.1 trillion Vietnamese đồng. Technology was applied for the first time in all stages. The census offered two response options: direct (face-to-face interview) and indirect (online). In addition to the conventional pre-printed paper form, for the first time ever, the census was also conducted using electronic devices with computer-assisted personal interviewing and the Internet, thereby improving the quality of the data, streamlining data processing, and saving money.

There were two types of questionnaires. The standard set of questions for the whole population included 22 basic questions about population and housing. The second set of questions, which sampled 9% of the population, consisted of 65 questions to gather in-depth information on population, demographics and housing. The census covered all Vietnamese people residing in the territory of the Socialist Republic of Vietnam up to the time of the census and all Vietnamese people allowed to go abroad by the authorities, as well as recording all deaths from 16 February 2018 (the first day of the Lunar New Year) to 31 March 2019, and gathering housing information.

Along with the widespread use of information technology, other changes of the 2019 census included the use of two-stage stratified sampling (which ensured the representativeness of the indicators to the district level), the inclusion of sustainable development goals in the questionnaires, and an improved process of drawing commune and ward base maps and dividing enumeration areas.

== Preparation ==
Preparations for the census began nearly 2 years in advance, when in early 2017 the General Statistics Office began researching software to use for electronic questionnaires. Later that year, the General Statistics Office collaborated with the United Nations Population Fund to organize a workshop.

Initial surveys using electronic questionnaires on mobile devices began in 2018, for that year's national population change survey. In September, census rehearsals had begun, and by November the Ministries of Public Security, Defense, Foreign Affairs and authorities at all levels had all established steering committees. In the last two months of 2018, surveyors were sent to record the number of people in households and introduced Internet response option. Residents preferring the Internet option provided phone numbers and received account name and password for authentication on 31 March 2019.

The 2019 census was the largest census up to that time in Vietnam, involving 147,000 enumerators.

== Timeline ==
Census work began on 1 April 2019, and the census response period ended on 25 April 2019. It was conducted faster than any previous census in Vietnam, thanks to the use of technology.

In Ho Chi Minh City, all census work was done by mobile devices or via the Internet, by 12,000 enumerators in nearly 19,500 enumeration areas. Da Nang, with more than 1,300 enumerators, was one of the localities with the highest rate of online response. Hanoi had about 17,800 enumeration areas and mobilized more than 12,000 enumerators, while Haiphong mobilized more than 2,300 enumerators. The Ministry of Public Security led more than 4,000 enumerators, over 170 supervisors and conducted census in over 3,000 enumeration areas, with two different set of questions for officers and prisoners. By 13 April, 60.0% of all households had submitted their census questionnaire. By 25 April, the response rate was 99.95%. After this day, households who had not responded were able to contact the steering committee on 26, 27 and 28 April. The steering committees at all levels before 26 April had to send a quick report to the Central Steering Committee, who then submitted summary reports to the government.

Preliminary results of the census were released on 11 July 2019, and the release of the complete results were announced on 19 December.

== Results ==
General population indicators (2019)
Description	Number	Percentage
Total population	96,208,984	100.0%
By sex
Male	47,881,061	49.8%
Female	48,327,923	50.2%
By geographic distribution
Urban	33,059,735	34.4%
Rural	63,149,249	65.6%
By marital status
Total aged 15+	72,837,102	100%
Single	16,364,940	22.4%
Currently married	50,392,598	69.2%
Divorced	1,286,526	1.76%
Separated	217,272	0.29%
Widowed	4,575,766	6.2%

On census reference day, 1 April 2019, Vietnam had a population of 96,208,984 people, mostly concentrated in the Red River Delta and the Southeast region. After 10 years, the population had increased by 10.4 million people, with an average annual population growth rate of 1.14% per year, lower than the preceding decade. Those with disabilities accounted for 3.7% of the population aged 5 years and over. The most prevalent cause of deaths for one year before the census reference day (90.9%) was disease, followed by traffic accidents and work-related accidents. 88% of households used motorized personal vehicles. The population density was 290 people/km^{2}.

The male population was 47,881,061 people (49.8%) and the female population was 48,327,923 people (50.2%). The nationwide sex ratio for all ages was 0.991, though it varied by age group and region. The sex ratio at birth was significantly skewed, at 111.5 boys for every 100 girls, while the natural sex ratio at birth is around 104–106 boys per 100 girls. Average life expectancy was 73.6 years; the figure for males was 71.0 years while the figure for females was 76.3 years.

The urban population was 33,122,548 people, and the average annual urban growth rate was 2.64% per year. The Red River Delta and the Southeast were the two regions with the largest populations of immigrants. The total number of households was 26,870,079, an increase of 4.4 million households from 2009, or an average annual growth rate of 1.8% per year, which was lower than in the 1999–2009 period and the lowest in 40 years.

77.5% of the population aged 15 years and over had been married at least once. More than 9% of women aged 20 to 24 had their first marriage before the age of 18. The singulate mean age at marriage was 25.2 years old.

The total fertility rate was 2.09 children per woman, and the rate in rural areas was higher than in urban areas. The total fertility rate was highest in the Northern midlands and mountainous and Central Highlands regions, while the Southeast and Mekong River Delta area had the lowest. The higher the education level of women, the fewer number of children she was likely to bear. Early adolescent childbearing still existed, most prevalently in the Northern midlands and mountainous and Central Highlands region.

The percentage of out-of-school children dropped to 8.3%. Nearly 81% of the population aged 15 and over did not have technical qualifications, while 2.05% of the population aged 15 and over were unemployed. Because of economic restructuring, for the first time, the number of workers in the service sector was higher than those in agriculture, forestry and fishing industry.

The average household consisted of 3.6 people. 99.4% of households had access to electricity, 97.4% used hygienic water, and 88.9% used hygienic latrines.

== Age demographics ==
There were significant changes in the population's age structure: the proportion of people of working age increased while the proportion of dependents decreased. 24% of the population was under 15 years old and 7.6% of the population was aged 65 or over, while the proportion of the working-age population was 68.4%. The results indicated that while Vietnam is still in a period of golden population structure, the rate of population ageing has increased rapidly over the last few years.

Population distribution by age (2019)
Age group	Number	Percentage
0–4	7,819,326	8.12%
5–9	8,332,719	8.66%
10–14	7,219,837	7.50%
15–19	6,506,217	6.76%
20–24	6,675,703	6.93%
25–29	8,447,977	8.78%
30–34	8,393,810	8.72%
35–39	7,692,386	7.99%
40–44	6,684,119	6.94%
45–49	6,257,471	6.50%
50–54	5,662,010	5.88%
55–59	5,108,724	5.31%
60–64	3,992,034	4.14%
65–69	2,685,271	2.79%
70–74	1,640,850	1.70%
75–79	1,171,811	1.21%
80–84	907,732	0.94%
85+	1,010,987	1.05%

== Ethnic demographics ==
The population of ethnically Vietnamese people was 82,085,826 people, accounting for 85.3% of the population. Of the remaining ethnic groups, 6 had over 1 million people, while 11 had a population of less than 5,000 people.

Population distribution by ethnicity (2019)
Description	Number	Percentage
Kinh	82,085,826	85.3%
Tày	1,845,492	1.9%
Thái	1,820,950	1.9%
Hoa	749,466	0.78%
Khmer	1,319,652	1.4%
Mường	1,452,095	1.5%
Nùng	1,083,298	1.1%
Mông	1,393,547	1.4%
Dao	891,151	0.93%
Gia Rai	513,930	0.53%
Ê Đê	398,671	0.41%
Ba Na	286,910	0.30%
Xơ Đăng	212,277	0.22%
Sán Chay	201,398	0.21%
Cơ Ho	200,800	0.21%
Chăm	178,948	0.19%
Sán Dìu	183,004	0.19%
Hrê	149,460	0.16%
Mnông	127,334	0.13%
Raglay	146,613	0.15%
Xtiêng	100,752	0.10%
Bru Vân Kiều	94,598	0.098%
Thổ	91,430	0.095%
Giáy	67,858	0.071%
Cơ Tu	74,173	0.077%
Gié Triêng	63,322	0.066%
Mạ	50,322	0.052%
Khơ Mú	90,612	0.094%
Co	40,442	0.042%
Tà Ôi	52,356	0.054%
Chơ Ro	29,520	0.031%
Kháng	16,180	0.017%
Xinh Mun	29,503	0.031%
Hà Nhì	25,539	0.027%
Chu Ru	23,242	0.024%
Lào	17,532	0.018%
La Chí	15,126	0.016%
La Ha	10,157	0.011%
Phù Lá	12,471	0.013%
La Hủ	12,113	0.013%
Lự	6,757	0.0070%
Lô Lô	4,827	0.0050%
Chứt	7,513	0.0078%
Mảng	4,650	0.0048%
Pà Thẻn	8,248	0.0086%
Cơ Lao	4,003	0.0042%
Cống	2,729	0.0028%
Bố Y	3,232	0.0034%
Ngái	1,649	0.0017%
Si La	909	0.00094%
Pu Péo	903	0.00094%
Brâu	525	0.00055%
Ơ Đu	428	0.00044%
Rơ Măm	639	0.00066%
Người nước ngoài (alien)	3,553	0.0037%
Không xác định (unknown)	349	0.00036%

== Religious demographics ==
Religion in Vietnam (2019)
1. Non-religious (86.3%)
2. Catholicism (6.10%)
3. Buddhism (4.79%)
4. Hoahaoism (1.02%)
5. Protestantism (1.00%)
6. Others (0.77%)

The majority of the population of Vietnam (86.32%) identified as non-religious, while 13.2 million identified as religious. Catholicism was the most-practiced religion with 5.9 million adherents, followed by Buddhism with 4.6 million.

Population by religious affiliation
Description	Number
Any religion	13,162,879
Catholic	5,866,169
Buddhist	4,606,543
Hòa Hảo	983,079
Protestant	960,558
Caodaism	556,234
Muslim	70,934
Brahmin	64,547
Đạo Tứ Ân Hiếu Nghĩa	30,416
Seventh-day Adventist Church	11,830
Mormonism	4,281
Pure Land Buddhism	2,306
Baháʼí Faith	2,153
Đạo Bửu Sơn Kỳ Hương	2,975
Phật giáo Hiếu Nghĩa Tà Lơn	401
Giáo hội Phật đường Nam Tông Minh Sư đạo	260
Minh lý đạo - Tam Tông Miếu	193
No religion	83,046,105

== Problems and controversies ==
Some problems during the census process included weak cell phone signal reception in some highland areas, absence or non-cooperation by residents, and difficulty accessing certain areas. As many residents were shift-workers, census takers also often had to come at night. Errors sometimes occurred during data synchronization, and some enumerators made mistakes while doing their work.

The census found a very low number of households without dwellings: only 1,244 households comprising 4,108 people, with homelessness practically non-existent in the large cities of Hanoi, Da Nang, and Ho Chi Minh City. These figures engendered some public controversy. According to the definition of the General Statistics Office, "households without dwellings are those living in tents, camps, or sidewalks", meaning living under the stairs was considered having a dwelling. In addition, whether one had a dwelling or not also did not depend on the ownership of the house. This definition is different from the criteria of the Ministry of Construction. For comparison, according to the Department of Construction of Ho Chi Minh City, there were about 476,000 households either not having a house or currently living with relatives — 12,000 times higher than the figures of the Statistics Office. Meanwhile, some districts also disagreed with the figures by the Statistics Office. For example, the government of Cần Giờ District believed that, due to not fully understanding the employment characteristics and work environment of some residents, the Statistics Office miscalculated the number of households without dwellings in the district as these households already had dwellings in other localities.

In addition, the official estimate of the population of Ho Chi Minh City raised some doubt. According to the city's Statistics Office, the city had 8.9 million inhabitants, while many people believed that it must have been between 14 and 15 million. Some also compared it to the figure released by Ho Chi Minh City Public Security Department, which was nearly 13 million people. According to the criteria of the Statistics Office, only those often residing in the city, with or without hộ khẩu, for six months or more, those residing for less than six months but having a tendency to remain, newborn children, and temporary absentees were considered permanent residents. Visitors, commuters, police and military officers, and out-of-city students were not considered residents.
