= Vengo =

Vengo may refer to:

In sociology

- the Vengo people
- the Vengo language

In media

- Vengo (film), a 2000 French film
- Vengo (album), a 2014 hip-hop album by Ana Tijoux
