= Causative =

Aspect of verb grammar

In linguistics, a causative (abbreviated caus) is a valency-increasing operation that indicates that a subject either causes someone or something else to do or be something or causes a change in state of a non-volitional event. Normally, it brings in a new argument (the causer), A, into a transitive clause, with the original subject S becoming the object O.

All languages have ways to express causation but differ in the means. Most, if not all, languages have specific or lexical causative forms (such as English rise → raise, lie → lay, sit → set). Some languages also have morphological devices (such as inflection) that change verbs into their causative forms or change adjectives into verbs of becoming. Other languages employ periphrasis, with control verbs, idiomatic expressions or auxiliary verbs. There tends to be a link between how "compact" a causative device is and its semantic meaning.

The normal English causative verb or control verb used in periphrasis is make rather than cause. Linguistic terms are traditionally given names with a Romance root, which has led some to believe that cause is more prototypical. While cause is a causative, it carries some additional meaning (it implies direct causation) and is less common than make. Also, while most other English causative verbs require a to complement clause (as in "My mom caused me to eat broccoli"), in Modern English make does not require one ("My mom made me eat broccoli"), at least when it is not being used in the passive voice. The bare infinitive's near-uniformity of use in this context is, however, a development in Modern English; contrast, e.g., Early Modern English He maketh me to lie down in green pastures (Ps. 23:2 [KJV]). (Note: Dixon, R.M.W. 2000. "A typology of causatives: form, syntax and meaning". In Dixon & Aikhenvald (2000) p. 30–83.)

== Terminology ==
Many authors have written extensively on causative constructions and have used a variety of terms, often to talk about the same things.

S, A, and O are terms used in morphosyntactic alignment to describe arguments in a sentence. The subject of an intransitive verb is S, the agent of a transitive verb is A, and the object of a transitive is O. These terms are technically not abbreviations (anymore) for "subject", "agent", and "object", though they can usually be thought of that way. P (standing for "patient") is often used instead of O in many works.

The term underlying is used to describe sentences, phrases, or words that correspond to their causative versions. Often, this underlying sentence may not be explicitly stated. For example, for the sentence "'John made Bill drive the truck'", the underlying sentence would be Bill drove the truck. This has also been called the base situation.

A derived sentence would be the causativized variant of the underlying sentence.

The causer is the new argument in a causative expression that causes the action to be done. The causer is the new argument brought into a derived sentence. In the example sentence above, John is the causer.

The causee is the argument that actually does the action in a causativized sentence. It is usually present in both the underlying and derived sentences. Bill is the causee in the above example.

== Devices ==
There are various ways of encoding causation, which form somewhat of a continuum of "compactness."

=== Lexical ===
Lexical causatives are common in the world's languages. There are three kinds of lexical causatives, the unifying factor being that the idea of causation is part of the semantics of the verb itself. (English, for example, employs all three of these kinds of lexical causatives.)

On the surface, lexical causatives look essentially the same as a regular transitive verb. There are a few reasons why this is not true. The first is that transitive verbs generally do not have an intransitive counterpart but lexical causatives do. The semantics of the verbs show the difference as well. A regular transitive verb implies a single event while a lexical causative implies a realization of an event: (Note: Velázquez-Castillo, Maura (2002). "Guaraní causative constructions." pg. 507–534 of Shibatani (2002).)

(a) John kicked the ice but nothing happened to it.
(b) *John melted the ice but nothing happened to it.

Sentence (b) is judged ungrammatical because it goes against the successful event implied by the verb melt.

==== One word ====
Some languages, including English, have ambitransitive verbs like break, burn or awake, which may either be intransitive or transitive ("The vase broke" vs. "I broke the vase.")

These are split into two varieties: agentive and patientive ambitransitives. Agentive ambitransitives (also called S=A ambitransitives) include verbs such as walk and knit because the S of the intransitive corresponds to the A of the transitive. For example:

(1a) Mary (S) is knitting.

(1b) Mary (A) is knitting a scarf (O).

This type of ambitransitive does not show a causative relationship.

For patientive ambitransitives (also called S=O ambitransitives), such as trip and spill, the S of the intransitive corresponds to the O of the transitive:

(2a) The milk (S) spilled.

(2b) Jim (A) spilled the milk (O).

These are further divided into two more types, based on speakers' intuition. Some, like spill in (2), are primarily transitive and secondarily intransitive. Other verbs like this include smash and extend. Other verbs, such as trip in (3) go the other way: they are primarily intransitive and secondarily transitive.

(3a) John (S) tripped.

(3b) Mary (A) tripped John (O).

Other examples of this type include explode, melt, dissolve, walk, and march. It is this type of ambitransitive verb that is considered a causative. This is given some anecdotal evidence in that to translate (3b) above into languages with morphological causatives, a morpheme would need to be attached to the verb.

Lexical causatives are apparently constrained to involving only one agentive argument. Semantically, the causer is usually marked as the patient. In fact, it is unlikely whether any language has a lexical causative for verbs such as swim, sing, read, or kick.

==== Irregular stem change ====
English fell (as in "Paul felled the tree") can be thought of as a lexical causative of fall ("the tree fell"), exemplifying this category. This is considered a lexical change because it is not at all productive. If it were productive, it would be an internal change morphological causative (below).

==== Two words ====
English has verb pairs such as rise and raise, eat and feed, see and show where one is essentially the causative correspondent of the other.

These pairs are linked semantically by various means, usually involving translation. For example, burn as in "The grass burned" (intransitive) would translate as awa- in Yimas, while burn as in "I burned the grass" (transitive) would translate as ampu- in Yimas.

=== Morphological ===
There are eight different morphological processes by which a causative may be marked, roughly organized by compactness:

Process	Basic verb	Causative form	Language
internal change	tìkti 'be suitable'	táikyti 'make suitable'	Lithuanian
tone change	nɔ̂ (high falling) 'be awake'	nɔ̄ (low level) 'awaken, rouse'	Lahu
consonant repetition	xarab 'go bad'	xarrab 'make go bad, ruin'	Gulf Arabic
vowel lengthening	mar 'die'	ma:r 'kill'	Kashmiri
reduplication	bengok 'shout'	be-bengok 'make shout'	Javanese
prefix	gǝbba 'enter'	a-gǝbba 'insert'	Amharic
suffix	-kam- 'die'	-kam-isa- 'kill'	Kʼicheʼ
circumfix	-č'am- 'eat'	-a-č'm-ev- 'feed (make eat)'	Georgian

Within morphological causatives, this degree of compactness bears an important variable when considering the semantics of the two processes. For example, mechanisms that do not change the length of the word (internal change, tone change) are shorter than those that lengthen it. Of those that lengthen it, shorter changes are more compact than longer.

Verbs can be classified into four categories, according to how susceptible they are to morphological causativization:

1. Inactive intransitives (faint)
2. Middle/ingestive verbs (either intransitive or transitive such as sit down, ascend, put clothes on, eat, or learn)
3. Active intransitives (work)
4. Transitive verbs (carry)

This hierarchy has some exceptions, but it does generally hold true. For example, given a text of Guarani, only about 16% of causatives apply to transitives. For some languages, it may not apply to transitive verbs productively and may only apply to verbs that denote abstract action or consumption of food. Additionally, within Athabaskan family, all languages can causativize inactive intransitives, but not all of them can causativize active intransitives or even transitives.

=== Two verbs in one predicate ===
A number of languages involve a form of analytic causative that involves two verbs in a single predicate, such as French, Spanish, Italian and Catalan. For example, when French faire is used as a causative, the causee noun phrase cannot occur between it and the next verb. (Note: Comrie, B. (1976). "The syntax of causative constructions: cross-language similarities and divergencies." pp. 261–312. In Shibantani 1976.)

je ferai manger les gâteaux à Jean
1SG.A make+FUT+1SG eat+INF the cakes PREP Jean
"I will make Jean eat the cakes."

Unlike most other Romance languages, Portuguese uses a periphrastic construction like that of English, discussed below.

Kiowa uses a similar mechanism. Verbs can be compounded with the transitive verb ɔ́m to create a causative: (Note: Watkins, L.J. (1984). A grammar of Kiowa Lincoln: University of Nebraska Press. p. 153. Cited in Dixon (2000).)

bé-k^{h}ó-ày-ɔ́m
2SG.A-now-start.off-CAUS+IMP
"Go ahead and run it [the tape recorder]!" (lit. "make it start off")

=== Periphrastic constructions ===
Some languages use a periphrastic (or analytic) construction to express causation and typically include two verbs and two clauses. English causatives prototypically use make (but other verbs such as cause, order, allow, force, compel can be used) in the main clause with the lexical verb in a subordinate clause, as in "I made him go."

Other languages, such as Persian, (Note: Mahootian, S. (1997). Persian. London: Routledge. Cited in Dixon (2000)) have the opposite syntax: the causative is in a subordinating clause and the main verb is in the main clause, as in the following example from Macushi:

[imakui'pî kupî Jesus-ya] emapu'tî yonpa-'pî makui-ya teuren
bad do Jesus-ERG CAUS try-PAST Satan-ERG
"Satan unsuccessfully tried to make Jesus do bad."

Canela-Krahô has a combination of the two in which the causee is marked twice, once in each clause:

Capi te [i-jōt na] i-to
Capi PAST 1SG.S-sleep SUBORD 1SG.O-CAUS
"Capi made me sleep."

Portuguese also has a periphrastic construction like that of English but unlike most other Romance languages:

Eu fiz José comer os bolos
1SG make+PAST+1SG José eat+INF the cakes
"I made José eat the cakes."

Analytic causatives are sometimes not considered to be valency increasing devices, but they can semantically be interpreted as such (Note: Payne, Thomas E. (1997). Describing morphosyntax: A guide for field linguists. Cambridge: Cambridge University Press. p. 173–186.).

== Semantics ==
A language may have one or more different formal mechanisms for expression of causation. For languages with only one, the semantic range is broad. For those with multiple, there is always a semantic difference between the two. R. M. W. Dixon breaks down these semantic differences into 9 parameters, involving the verb itself, the causee, and the causer:

(a) Parameters that relate to the verb itself

- 1. State/Action: Can the causative apply to state and process verbs or does it apply to action verbs?
- 2. Transitivity: Does the causative apply to only intransitives, to intransitives and some transitives, or to all verbs?

(b) Parameters that relate to the thing being caused (the original S or A)

- 3. Control: Does the causee have control of the activity?
- 4. Volition: Does the causee do the action willingly or unwillingly?
- 5. Affectedness: Is the causee completely or partially affected?

(c) Parameters that relate to the causer (the new A in a causative construction)

- 6. Directness: Does the causer act directly or indirectly?
- 7. Intention: Is the result achieved accidentally or intentionally?
- 8. Naturalness: Does the activity happen fairly naturally or is it with effort, violence, or force?
- 9. Involvement: How involved was the causer in the activity?

These parameters are not mutually exclusive. Many causative constructions involve the semantics of two or more parameters. However, the difference between the causatives in a language most likely will be distinguished by one of the parameters.

== Relationship between devices and semantics ==
=== Animacy of the object ===
There is a strong correlation between the semantics of a causative and the mechanism by which it is expressed. Generally, if a causative is more "compact" than another, it usually implies a more direct causation.

For inanimate and unconscious objects, English analytic causatives (1–3) are therefore not completely synonymous with lexical causatives (4–6):

1. "I made the tree fall."
2. "I made the chicken die."
3. "I made the cup rise to my lips."
4. "I felled the tree."
5. "I killed the chicken."
6. "I raised the cup to my lips."

Analytic causatives (1–3) imply that no physical contact was involved and therefore was done by some sort of magical power or telekinesis. Lexical causatives (4–6) do not imply that meaning.

For animate and conscious objects, there is a different difference in meaning:

1. "He caused them to lie down."
2. "He laid them down."

(1) makes sense only if they are animate and awake. Barring magic, (2) makes sense only if the object is inanimate or unconscious.

=== Finite and non-finite verbs ===
Generally, the larger the distance between the causer and the causee, the more finite the verb is. Consider the following examples from Spanish:

Montezuma hizo comer pan a Cortés.
Montezuma CAUS:3SG:PERF eat:INF bread DAT Cortés
"Montezuma made Cortés eat bread."

Montezuma hizo que Cortés comiera pan.
Montezuma CAUS:3SG:PERF that Cortés eat:3SG:SJV.PST bread
"Montezuma made Cortés eat bread."

The first example implies that Montezuma was physically there and was directly involved in making Cortés eat bread. The second example implies that Montezuma was not physically there and arranged for something to happen to make Cortés eat bread, perhaps by killing all of his cattle. That could approximate the English construction "Montezuma got Cortés to eat bread." Therefore, at least in Spanish, a conjugated verb implies a less direct causation.

=== Dixon's prototypes ===
Dixon examines this correlation cross-linguistically, and summarizes his findings in the following table. In this table, L refers to lexical causatives, M_{1} refers to more compact morphological processes while M_{2} refers to less compact processes, CP refers to complex predicates (two verbs, one predicate), and P refers to periphrastic constructions. These processes are explained more clearly in the devices section above.

Parameter	Meaning		Mechanism		Language
Parameter	Causative type 1	Causative type 2	Causative type 1	Causative type 2	Language
1	state	action	M_{1}	M_{2}	Amharic
1	state	action	M	P	Bahasa Indonesia, Malay
2	intransitive	all transitive	M	P	Austronesian languages, Mayan languages, etc.
2	intransitive and simple transitive	ditransitive	M	P	Basque, Abkhaz
3	causee lacking control	causee having control	L	M	Japanese
3	causee lacking control	causee having control	M_{1}	M_{2}	Creek
4	causee willing	causee unwilling	M_{1}	M_{2}	Swahili
4	causee willing	causee unwilling	M	CP	Tangkhul Naga
4	causee willing	causee unwilling	M	P	Swahili
5	causee partially affected	causee fully affected	M_{1}	M_{2}	Tariana
6	direct	indirect	M_{1}	M_{2}	Nivkh, Apalaí, Hindi, Jingpaw
6	direct	indirect	M	P	Buru, Chrau, Alamblak, Mixtec, Korean
7	intentional	accidental	M	CP	Kammu
7	intentional	accidental	P	M plus P	Chrau
8	naturally	with effort	L	M	Fijian
8	naturally	with effort	L	P	English
8	naturally	with effort	M	P	Russian, Tariana

Parameter 9, Involvement, cannot be included in the table because the only two languages with this distinction, Nomatsiguenga and Kamayurá, the morphemes are about the same length. When a larger sample of languages show this distinction, perhaps this parameter can be included in the table.

The table shows that for each of eight semantic parameters outlined in the semantics section above, more compact causative processes show one distinction while less compact processes show the other distinction. For example, Parameter 6 distinguishes between more direct and less direct causation. In Hindi, M_{1}, or the shorter morphological process, shows direct causation while M_{2}, the longer morphological process, shows indirect causation.

Summarizing the table, Dixon has given two prototypes for causatives:

Prototype 1

- Causer achieves the result natural, intentionally, and directly
- Causee either lacking control or being willing and may be partially affected
- Less transitive verbs affected

Prototype 2

- Causer achieves the result accidentally, with effort, or acts indirectly
- Causee is in control but unwilling and is completely affected.
- More likely to apply to all types of verbs

All eight of the components in each prototype are never attested in a single causative. However, a single process may have two or three components. Dixon admits to these being very tentative and in need for further investigation.

== Syntax ==
R.M.W. Dixon also outlines the syntactic possibilities of causatives in the world's languages.

=== Intransitives ===
Since intransitive verbs have low valency, virtually any type of causative construction can apply to them productively within a language. Some constructions are only allowed with intransitive verbs and some languages (such as Arabic, Blackfoot, and Gothic) only allow causatives of intransitive verbs, with some exceptions. In all cases, the original subject of the underlying intransitive verb corresponds with the object of the derived transitive verb. All languages have this construction, though some allow a semantic difference if the original subject is marked differently (such as Japanese and Hungarian).

For split systems, causatives of intransitives may be treated differently.

The syntax of a causative construction is almost always the same as some other type of sentence, such as a sentence with a transitive verb. Tariana, however, is an exception to this rule.

=== Transitives ===
In the causative of a transitive verb, the new causer always becomes the new A of the sentence. What happens to the causee and the original object depend on the language. Dixon shows that there are five main types of situations:

Causative of a transitive
type	causer	original A (causee)	original O	languages
(i)	A	special marking	O	Nivkh, Telugu
(ii)	A	retains A-marking	O	Kabardian, Trumai, Qiang
(iii)	A	has O-marking	has O-marking	Hebrew, Tariana, Amharic, Sanskrit
(iv)	A	O	non-core	Javanese, Swahili, Kammu, Babungo
(v)	A	non-core	O	many languages

Within type (v) there are two main subtypes. Either the original A goes into the first empty slot in a hierarchy or it always takes a certain function.

For the first subtype, there is a hierarchy involved in the language:

subject > direct object > indirect object > oblique > genitive > object of comparison.

French is a language that follows this hierarchy. When a causative is employed, the original A does not get marked the same for intransitives, transitives, and ditransitives. In this first example, the verb in intransitive, and with the subject slot taken, the original A becomes a direct object:

je ferai courir Jean
1SG+NOM make+FUT+1SG run+INF Jean
"I will make Jean run."

The following example has a transitive verb. The subject and direct object slots are filled (with je and les gâteaux, respectively) so the original A becomes an indirect object:

je ferai manger les gâteaux à Jean
1SG+NOM make+FUT+1SG eat+INF the cakes PREP Jean
"I will make Jean eat the cakes."

This final French example has a ditransitive verb. The subject is je, the direct object is une lettre, and the indirect object is directeur, so the original A is marked as an oblique:

je ferai écrire une lettre au directeur par Jean
1SG+NOM make+FUT+1SG write+INF a letter PREP+ART headmaster PREP Jean
"I will make Jean write a letter to the headmaster"

While some writers have called this hierarchical causative construction the norm, outside of Romance languages it is in fact rather rare.

Most other languages are of the second subtype of type (v), and the original A takes on a set case or marking, regardless whether the underlying verb is intransitive or transitive:

Further divisions of type (v)
causer	original A (causee)	original O	languages
A	dative	O	Sanuma, Apalai, Kamaiurá, Turkish, Japanese
A	instrumental	O	Hungarian, Kannada, Marathi
A	locative	O	Some languages of Daghestan
A	allative	O	West Greenlandic Eskimo
A	adessive	O	The morphological causative in Finnish.
A	possessive	O	Tsez

=== Ditransitives ===
The syntactic and morphological constraints of individual language generally restrict causatives of ditransitive verbs. The underlying phrase already contains an A, O, and indirect object, and so in order to accommodate a fourth argument, languages employ a variety of constructions. They tend to be idiosyncratic and are difficult to group together into types. Additionally, data is patchy for many languages since descriptions of languages seldom include information of causatives of ditransitives.

=== Double causatives ===
Some types of causative constructions essentially do not permit double causatives, e.g. it would be difficult to find a lexical double causative. Periphrastic causatives however, have the potential to always be applied iteratively (Mom made Dad make my brother make his friends leave the house.).

Many Indo-Aryan languages (such as Hindustani) have lexical double causatives.

For morphological causatives, some languages do not allow single morpheme to be applied twice on a single verb (Jarawara) while others do (Capanawa, Hungarian, Turkish, Kabardian, Karbi), though sometimes with an idiomatic meaning (Swahili's means force to do and Oromo's carries an intensive meaning). Other languages, such as Nivkh, have two different morphological mechanisms that can apply to a single verb. Still others have one morpheme that applies to intransitives and another to transitives (Apalai, Guarani). All of these examples apply to underlying intransitive verbs, yielding a ditransitive verb. So far, there are no reliable data for a morphological double causative of a transitive verb, resulting in a verb with four arguments.

== Other topics ==
=== Causative (repetitive) ===
Yokuts, an indigenous language spoken in California, has a morpheme, -lsaˑ, that indicates causation in addition to repetition. This is separate from the language's normal mechanisms of causation.

'utuˑ -lsaˑ -unhoˑ
{play music} CAUS AGT
"one who makes (people) play music repeatedly"

This implies a single act by the causer, but multiple acts by the causee.

=== Causative voice ===
The causative voice is a grammatical voice promoting the oblique argument of a transitive verb to an actor argument. When the causative voice is applied to a verb, its valency increases by one. If, after the application of the grammatical voice, there are two actor arguments, one of them is obligatorily demoted to an oblique argument.

Japanese, Turkish and Mongolian are examples of languages with the causative voice. The following are examples from Japanese:

Tanaka-kun ga atsume-ru
Tanaka NOM collect-PRES
"Tanaka collects them."

Tanaka-kun ni atsume-sase-yō
Tanaka DAT collect-CAUS-COHORT
"Let's get Tanaka to collect them."

kodomo ga hon o yom-u
children NOM book ACC read-PRES
"Children read books."

kodomo ni hon o yom-ase-ru
children DAT book ACC read-CAUS-PRES
"(They) make children read books."

=== Causal case ===
The causal or causative case (abbreviated caus) is a grammatical case that indicates that the marked noun is the cause or reason for something. It is found in the Native South American language Quechua, and Northeast Caucasian Archi. It is also found in extinct Tocharian B, an Indo-European language.

=== Causal-final case ===
The causal-final is a grammatical case in Hungarian (and Chuvash) expressing the meaning 'for the purpose of, for the reason that', and denoting price asked of or paid for goods. It is formed by adding the ending suffix -ért to the end of the noun, e.g. kenyér "bread" >kenyérért "for bread", e.g. elküldtem a boltba kenyérért "I sent him to the store for bread". It is not affected by vowel harmony in Hungarian.

== Literature ==
=== Shibatani ===
Shibatani lists three criteria for entities and relations that must be encoded in linguistic expressions of causation:

1. An agent causing or forcing another participant to perform an action, or to be in a certain condition
2. The relation between [the] two events [=the causing event, and the caused performing/being event] is such that the speaker believes that the occurrence of one event, the ‟caused event," has been realized at t2, which is after t1, the time of the ‟causing event"
3. The relation between causing event and caused event is such that the speaker believes the occurrence of the caused event depends wholly on the occurrence of the causing event—the dependency of the two events here must be to the extent that it allows the speaker a counterfactual inference that the caused event would not have taken place at a particular time if the causing event had not taken place, provided that all else had remained the same.

This set of definitional prerequisites allows for a broad set of types of relationships based, at least, on the lexical verb, the semantics of the causer, the semantics of the causee and the semantics of the construction explicitly encoding the causal relationship. Many analysts (Comrie (1981), Song (1996), Dixon (2000) and others) have worked to tease apart what factors (semantic or otherwise) account for the distribution of causative constructions, as well as to document what patterns actually occur cross-linguistically.

=== Comrie ===
Bernard Comrie focuses on the typology of the syntax and semantics of causative constructions proper. Crucially, Comrie (and others to be discussed here) distinguish between the linguistic encoding of causal relations and other extra-linguistic concerns such as the nature of causation itself and questions of how humans perceive of causal relations. While certainly not irrelevant, these extra-linguistic questions will, for now, be left aside. Comrie usefully characterizes causative events in terms of two (or more) microevents perceived of composing a macroevent, and encoded in a single expression (of varying size and form). Formally, he categorizes causatives into 3 types, depending on the contiguity of the material encoding the causing event and that encoding the caused event. These are: 1) lexical causatives, in which the two events are expressed in a single lexical item, as in the well-discussed case of English kill; 2) morphological causatives, in which the causing event and the caused event are encoded in a single verbal complex via causative morphology, and, prototypically, morphological marking showing the status of affected arguments. Finally, Comrie discusses analytic causatives, in which the causing event and the caused event are encoded in separate clauses.

Comrie's work is also noteworthy for having brought the notion of syntactic hierarchy to bear on the typology of causative constructions. A hierarchy of grammatical relations had already been formulated to help explain possibilities for relative clause formation (first presented as Keenan and Comrie's (1972) NP accessibility hierarchy; see Croft 1990: 147), and Comrie argued that a similar hierarchy was in play, at least in some constructions, in the marking of the original A argument when a base transitive clause is causativized. The hierarchy is as follows:

- subject > direct object > indirect object > oblique > genitive

Comrie's argument was, in short, that some causativized-transitive constructions mark the new A as belonging to the leftmost available slot in the above hierarchy. Dixon (2000) fleshes out a version this analysis in more detail.

=== Song ===
Presenting a typology of causatives and causation based on a database of 600 languages, Song is very critical of typological work that depends on statistical inference, citing data from the Niger-Congo family that contradicts some earlier claims that "languages within genera are generally fairly similar typologically". Song therefore culls data from every language for which adequate documentation is available to him, and categorizes the various causative constructions gleaned therefrom into three classes: COMPACT, AND and PURP.

Song employs the following terminology:

- [Scause] – the clause which denotes a causing event
- [Seffect] – the clause which denotes the caused event
- [Vcause] – verbal elements of [Scause]
- [Veffect]- verbal elements of [Seffect]

The major differences between Song's analysis and Comrie (1981) and Dixon (2000), is that Song lumps the range of lexical and morphological causatives together under the label COMPACT, in which [Vcause] can be "less than a free morpheme" (e.g., bound morpheme [prefix, suffix, infix, circumfix, reduplication], zero-derivation, suppletion); or "a free morpheme", in which [Vcause] and [Veffect] form a single grammatical unit. Most of the examples given look like serial verb constructions, and no in-depth analysis is undertaken for some of the constructions in which [Vcause] and [Veffect] are less formally contiguous. Song notes this non-contiguity, but does not undertake to explain why it might be important.

The AND causative, for Song, is any construction with a separate [Scause] and [Seffect] i.e., in which "two clauses [are] involved". This, in theory, could include larger, multi-clausal expressions of causal relations which many analysts probably would not label a 'causative construction', e.g.: 'It rained yesterday, so they stayed home', but the boundaries of the AND causative category are not discussed.

One of Song's major contributions to the literature is fleshing out an analysis of his PURP causative. These are constructions which encode intended causation on the part of the causer, but which do not encode any outcome: i.e., the speaker encodes [Vcause] and causer intentionality, but remains agnostic as to whether [Veffect] was felicitously effected.

=== Talmy ===
Leonard Talmy conducts an in-depth investigation of different types of causal relations. Talmy refers to these as "lexicalization patterns," a term that may reman unclear to some, given that few of the examples given in his discussion are lexical items, and most interpretations of "different types of causation incorporated in the verb root" are in fact wholly dependent on other morphosyntactic material in the clause. Below is his list of possible (semantic) causative types, with examples:

- autonomous events (non-causative) The vase broke.
- resulting-event causation The vase broke from a ball's rolling into it.
- causing-event causation A ball's rolling into it broke the vase.
- instrument causation A ball broke the vase.
- author causation (unintended) I broke the vase in rolling a ball into it.
- agent causation (intended) I broke the vase by rolling a ball into it.
- undergoer situation (non-causative) My arm broke (on me) when I fell.
- self-agentive causation I walked to the store.
- caused agency (inductive causation) I sent him to the store.

One question remaining to be explored is how this set of divisions usefully differs from other analysts' typologies of the semantics of encoding causal relations. Some overlap in the types of semantic information in play is immediately apparent. However, in cases of instrument causation ('the hammer broke the cup'), it would be expected that the 'causer' be the one acting directly [Dixon's criterion 6] and to be involved in the activity [criterion 9]. Likewise, one would expect instances of caused agency to include more information on causee control on willingness [criteria 3 & 4].

== Indo-European languages ==
=== Germanic languages ===
==== Proto-Germanic ====
In Proto-Germanic, the parent language of Germanic languages such as English, causative verbs are formed by adding a suffix -j/ij- to the past-tense ablaut of a strong verb, with Verner's Law voicing applied. (All of those characteristics derive from the way that causative verbs are formed in Proto-Indo-European, with an accented -éy- suffix added to the o-grade of a non-derived verb.) Here are some examples:

- *rīsaną (I) "to rise" → *raizijaną "to raise", i.e. "to cause to rise"
- *frawerþaną (III) "to perish" → *frawardijaną "to destroy", i.e. "to cause to perish"
- *nesaną (V) "to survive" → *nazjaną "to save", i.e. "to cause to survive"
- *ligjaną (V) "to lie down" → *lagjaną "to lay": "to cause to lie down"
- *grētaną (VII) "to weep" → *grōtijaną "to cause to weep"

In English, to sit/to seat", and in German, sitzen/setzen form pairs of resultative/causative.

==== English ====
English uses various causative mechanisms, with varying degrees of productivity. There are a large number of lexical causatives, such as kill, open and feed.

Additionally, there are several morphemes that can express causation. For example, -(i)fy can be thought of as a causative in that it is a derivation that turns an adjective or noun into a "verb of becoming":

- simple → simplify = "to make simple", "to cause (something) to become simple"
- object → objectify = "to make into an object", "to cause (something) to become an object" (figuratively, that is)

en- can also be a causative. In English, adjectives (or stative verbs in other languages) can express the acquisition of a quality or changes of state with causatives, in the same way as with regular verbs. For example, if there is a stative verb to be large, the causative will mean to enlarge, to make grow. The reflexive form of the causative can then be used to mean to enlarge oneself, or even as a middle voice, to grow.

As far as lexical causatives are concerned, English has at least 49 causative verbs. Roughly half affect only sentient beings: allow, block, cause, enable, force, get, help, hinder, hold, impede, keep, leave, let, make, permit, prevent, protect, restrain, save, set, start, stimulate, stop. The others can affect either sentient or non-sentient beings: aid, bar, bribe, compel, constrain, convince, deter, discourage, dissuade, drive, have, hamper, impel, incite, induce, influence, inspire, lead, move, persuade, prompt, push, restrict, rouse, send, spur.

=== Sanskrit ===
In Sanskrit, there is a causative form of the verb (ṇijanta), which is used when the subject of a clause forces or makes the object perform an action. The causative suffix -ay is attached to the verbal root, which may cause vowel sandhi to take place:

- bhū "to be, exist" → bhāv-ay; for example, bhāvayati "he causes to be"
- khad "to eat" → khād-ay; for example, khādayāmi "I cause to eat" = "I feed"

=== Persian ===
In Persian, the causative form of the verb is formed by adding ân(i)dan to the present stem:

- xordan (to eat) → xor (present stem) → xorândan (to cause/make to eat)
- xandidan (to laugh) → xand (present stem) → xandândan (to cause/make to laugh)

=== Lithuanian ===
In Lithuanian, the causative form of the verb is made by adding suffix -(d)in- to the present stem:

- skraidyti (to fly) → skraidinti (to make to fly)
- sėdėti (to sit) → sodinti (to make to sit)
- juoktis (to laugh) → juokinti (to make to laugh)
- plaukti (to swim) → plaukdinti (to make to swim)
- šokti (to dance) → šokdinti (to make to dance)

=== Latin ===
The topic of causatives has not been studied much for Latin, mainly because of its lack of productive morphological causative.

=== Hindustani ===
Hindustani uses the infix -(l)ā- and -(l)vā- to make verbs causative.

- karnā "to do" → karānā "to have done" → "karvānā" → "to have someone make someone do."
- paṛhnā "to read" → paṛhānā "to make someone read" → "paṛhvānā" "to cause someone to make someone read."
- hilnā "to move" → hilānā "to have something moved" → hilvānā "to have someone make something move."
- pīnā "to drink" → pilānā "to have someone drink" → pilvānā "to have someone make someone drink": "Usne naukrānī se bachchõ-ko pānī pilvāyā" - "She had the maid make the kids drink water."

=== Bengali ===
The causative verbs are called prayōjaka kriẏā (প্রযোজক ক্রিয়া) in Bengali. In the simplest way, the causative form of a verb can be formed by adding the suffix "-nō" নো with the verbal noun form of the given verb.

- dēkhā দেখা 'to see' → dēkhānō দেখানো 'to show/to cause someone to see'.
- khāōẏā খাওয়া 'to eat' → khāōẏānō খাওয়ানো 'to feed/to cause someone to eat'.

From the verbal root (dhātu ধাতু in Bengali) perspective, the formation of causatives is done by adding the suffix "-ā" -আ with the verb roots ending with a consonant, and the suffix "-ōẏā" ওয়া with those roots ending with a vowel. Thus, the verbal root transformations of the two previously mentioned verbs are:

- dēkh দেখ্ → dēkhā দেখা
- khā খা → khāōẏā খাওয়া

These verb roots are thereafter inflected with tense, aspect and mood.

== Basque ==
The Basque language has two ways to form causative verbs: by using a non-ergative transitive verb in the absolute form, or by the morphological causativization. The first method is only possible with a restricted set of verbs which excludes those whose subjects take the ergative case, such as the verb eztul egin (cough—literally "make (a) cough").

Haurrak katua hil du
child.ERG cat.ABS die AUX:3SG.3SG
'The child killed the cat'

Haurrak katua hilarazi du
child.ERG cat.ABS die.CAU AUX:3SG.3SG
'The child caused the cat to die'

== Turkish ==
In addition to very productive morphological causatives, Turkish also has some lexical causatives: kır- "break", yırt- "split", dik- "plant", yak- "burn", sakla- "hide", aç- "open".

== Semitic languages ==
In most Semitic languages, there is a causative form of the verb. It is postulated that in Proto-Semitic, the causative verbal stem was formed by the š- prefix, which has become ʾa-, hi- or ī- in different languages.

- Syriac: kəθav "he wrote" → ʾaxtev "he composed"
- Arabic: ʿalima "he knew" → ʾaʿlama "he informed"
- Hebrew: ṣaħak "he laughed" → hiṣħik "he made someone laugh"

Arabic also has a causative form (Form II) created by gemination of the central consonant of the triliteral root, as follows:

- ʿalima "he knew" → ʿallama "he taught"

The ʾa- form (Form IV), while it is used in Modern Standard Arabic, is no longer productive in many of the colloquial varieties of Arabic, which uniformly prefer Form II.

== Japanese ==
Japanese has lexical forms and a morphological device to signify causation. Lexical forms come in pairs of intransitive and transitive verbs, where the causee is mostly inanimate.

- ochiru "to fall" → otosu "to drop (something) or to let fall"

However, both intransitive and transitive verbs can form the causative in a mostly regular pattern, now with the causee being mostly animate:

- hairu "to go in" → hairaseru "to let or force (someone) in"
- ireru "to put in" → iresaseru "to let or force (someone) put (something) in"

In the context of an intransitive verb, the syntax of Japanese causatives allows a two-way distinction in the causee's willingness to perform the action. If the new object is marked in the accusative case (o), it suggests that the causee did the action willingly, suggesting the agent allowed or requested the action rather than forcing or demanding it. However, if the object is marked in the dative case (ni), it expresses the idea that the causee was forced to perform the action. With a transitive verb, this contrast is not directly visible as a clause cannot contain two noun phrases marked as accusative.

== Khmer ==
Khmer has six prefixes and one infix to derive the causative form of verbs, but they vary in frequency and productiveness. The consonantal prefix p- is one of them:

- coap "joined" → pcoap "to join"
- cum "around" → pcum "to gather"

== Uralic languages ==
=== Finnish ===
Causative forms are also found in the Uralic languages of Europe, such as Finnish:

- syödä "to eat" → syöttää "to feed"
- täysi "full" → täyttää "to fill"
- haihtua "to evaporate" → haihduttaa "to vaporize"

The causative suffix is often used irregularly and/or because of historical reasons, as the following Finnish examples:

- olla "to be" → olettaa "to assume", not "to make exist"
- kirja- ancient "patterns (of embroidery or text)" but modern "book" → kirjoittaa "to write" ("transform into patterns of text"), not "to transform into books"

=== Hungarian ===
Hungarian marks the original subject of an intransitive differently in causative forms to convey direct causation. If the causee is marked by the accusative case, a more direct causation is implied than if the instrumental case is used.

== Austronesian languages ==
=== Māori ===
In Māori, an Austronesian language, the whaka- prefix can be added to a verb:

- ako "to learn" becomes whakaako "to teach" (to cause to learn)

=== Philippine languages ===
In Philippine languages such as Tagalog and Ilokano, the pa- prefix is added to verbal forms and to adjectives to form causatives:

- dakkel "big (adjective)" → padakkelen "to enlarge" (Ilokano)
- kain "eat" → pakainin "to make eat, to feed" (Tagalog)

=== Malay ===
In Malay/Indonesian, causatives are formed from the prefix per- (it becomes memper- after actor focus/active prefix meng-, expected *memer- as in *memerhatikan found informally). While most languages use their causative affix for derivational purposes, it has integrated to Malay verb inflection system.

- baik "good" → memperbaiki (+ local transitive suffix -i) "to fix something"
- baru "new" → memperbarui (+ local transitive suffix -i) "to renew/update something"

== Guaraní ==
In Guaraní, there are three causatives: one for transitive verbs and two for intransitive verbs. In some texts, the first one is called "coactive."

The -uka suffix (or one of its allomorphes: -yka, -ka) is added to transitive verbs:

- ajapo "I make" → japouka "I make (someone) do".

The mbo- prefix is added to intransitive oral verbs and is replaced by mo- for nasal verbs:

- puka "to laugh" → mbopuka "to make (someone) laugh"
- guata "to walk" → mboguata "to guide"
- pu'ã "to go up" → mopu'ã "to elevate"

The guero- (rero- or just ro-) prefix can also be added to intransitive verbs. It has a comitative meaning and translates roughly as "to cause something or someone to participate in an action with the subject:"

- guata "to walk" → roguata "to make (someone) take a walk with (the subject)"

The same root (guata) can take both causatives but with different meanings.

== Uto-Aztecan languages ==
=== Classical Nahuatl ===
Classical Nahuatl, in the Uto-Aztecan language family, has a well-developed morphological system of expressing causation by means of the suffix -tia:

- tlacua "he eats something" → quitlacualtia "he feeds him/her/it something" the causative makes the intransitive verb "eat something" into the bitransitive verb "feed someone something," requiring a pronominal prefix, in this case qui- "him/her/it")

Causativity is often used in honorific speech in Classical Nahuatl, and rather than simply "doing," the honored person "causes himself to do."

== Athabaskan languages ==
Rice makes the following points about morphological causatives in Athabaskan languages: (Note: Rice, Keren. 2000. "Voice and valency in the Athabaskan family." In Dixon & Aikhenvald (2000))

- In all Athabaskan languages surveyed [including Hupa, for which an ample data set is presented], the causativizing morphology can causativize at least some intransitive verbs with patientive subjects.
- For intransitive verbs with agentive patients, the family shows a split: only some languages then allow morphological causativization.
- Koyukon (Northern Athabaskan; Alaska) was found to be the only language in the survey allowing productive morphological causativization of transitive verbs.
- Perhaps the presence of the direct object pronoun in the causative construction has something to do with whether the causee is human or animate or is capable of being regarded as such. When the causee or the verb cannot be or is not perceived as a potential controller, the pronoun is not found [in the Athabaskan languages surveyed].

The semantic factor of causee control, or the degree of control that that causee wields over the effecting of the caused microevent (also discussed as parameter #3 on Dixon's (2000:62) list) and which Rice (2001) finds to be a major factor in other Athabaskan causatives helps account for much of the distribution of the Hupa syntactic causative (below).

=== Hupa ===
Golla, in his (1970) descriptive grammar of Hupa (summarized in Sapir and Golla (2001)), describes three classes of morphologically derived causatives:

1. causatives from descriptive neuters with ƚ-classifier (176)
  ni-whon’ 'be good, beautiful' → O ni-(w)-ƚ-whon’ 'cause O to be beautiful'
2. causatives from primary extension neuters with ƚ- classifier (76-77, 201)
  na-…‘a’ 'O hangs' → na-O-ƚ-‘a’ 'hang O up'
3. causatives from primary intransitive action themes (76-77, 204)
  ti-ch’id 'grow tired' → O-ti-ƚ-ch’id 'tire O out'

While Golla does not generalize about the semantics of verb themes that are compatible with causative ƚ-, several preliminary generalizations can be made. Firstly, in the three cases described by Golla, O [the undergoer] is neither controlling nor agentive; O is largely patientive in all cases. Secondly, the causer appears to be acting directly on O. Thirdly, none of the examples given (including the examples above) involve the causativization of a base-transitive theme.

== Central Alaskan Yup'ik ==
Mithun (2000) lists nine causatives for Central Alaskan Yup'ik and describes each in detail. (Note: Mithun, Marianne. (2000). "Valency-changing derivation in Central Alaskan Yup'ik." In Dixon & Aikhenvald (2000)) Here is a brief description of each:

Morpheme	Approximate meaning
-vkar-/-cete-	'let, allow, permit, cause, compel'
-te-	'let, allow, cause, compel'
-nar-	'cause'
-rqe-	'intentionally or deliberately cause'
-cetaar-	'try to cause'
-narqe-	'tend to cause'
-naite-	'tend not to cause'
-cir-	'let, wait for, make'
-(r/l)i -	'become or cause to become'

== Bantu languages ==
=== Kinyarwanda ===
Kinyarwanda uses periphrastic causatives and morphological causatives.

The periphrastic causatives use the verbs -teer- and -tum-, which mean cause. With -teer-, the original S becomes the O of the main clause, leaving the original verb in the infinitive, just like in English:

Ábáana b-a-gii-ye.
children they-PST-go-ASP
"The children left."

Umugabo y-a-tee-ye ábáana ku-geend-a.
man he-PST-cause-ASP children INF-go-ASP
"The man caused the children to go.

With -túm-, the original S remains in the embedded clause and the original verb is still marked for person and tense:

N-a-andits-e amábárúwa meênshi.
I-PST-write-ASP letters many
"I wrote many letters.

Umukoôbwa y-a-tum-ye n-á-andik-a amábárúwa meênshi.
girl she-PST-cause-ASP I-PST-write-ASP letters many
"The girl caused me to write many letters."

Derivational causatives use the -iish- morpheme, which can be applied to intransitives (3) or transitives (4):

Ábáana ba-rá-ryáam-ye.
children they-PRES-sleep-ASP
"The children are sleeping."

Umugóre a-ryaam-iish-ije ábáana
woman she-sleep-CAUS-ASP children
"The woman is putting the children to sleep."

Ábáana ba-ra-som-a ibitabo.
children they-PRES-read-ASP books
"The children are reading the books."

Umugabo a-ra-som-eesh-a ábáana ibitabo.
man he-PRES-read-CAUS-ASP children books
"The man is making the children read the books."

The suffix -iish- implies an indirect causation (similar to English have in "I had him write a paper"), but other causatives imply a direct causation (similar to English make in "I made him write a paper").

One of the more direct causation devices is the deletion of what is called a "neutral" morpheme -ik-, which indicates state or potentiality. Stems with the -ik- removed can take -iish, but the causation is then less direct:

-mének-	"be broken"	-mén-	"break"	-méneesh-	"have (something) broken"
-sáduk-	"be cut"	-sátur-	"cut"	-sátuz-	"have (something) cut"

Another direct causation maker is -y- which is used for some verbs:

Ámáazi a-rá-shyúuh-a.
water {it-PRES-be warm-ASP}
"The water is being warmed."

Umugóre a-rá-shyúush-y-a ámáazi.
woman she-PRES-warm-CAUS-ASP water
"The woman is warming the water."

Umugabo a-rá-shyúuh-iish-a umugóre ámáazi.
man he-PRES-warm-CAUS-ASP woman water.
"The man is having the woman warm the water.

== Esperanto ==
In Esperanto, the suffix -ig- can be added to any kind of word:

- morti "to die" → mortigi "to kill"
- pura "clean" (adj) → purigi "to clean"
