= Ngo language =

Ngo may refer to:

- Vengo language
- the prestige dialect of the Obolo language
