= Demographics of Vietnam =

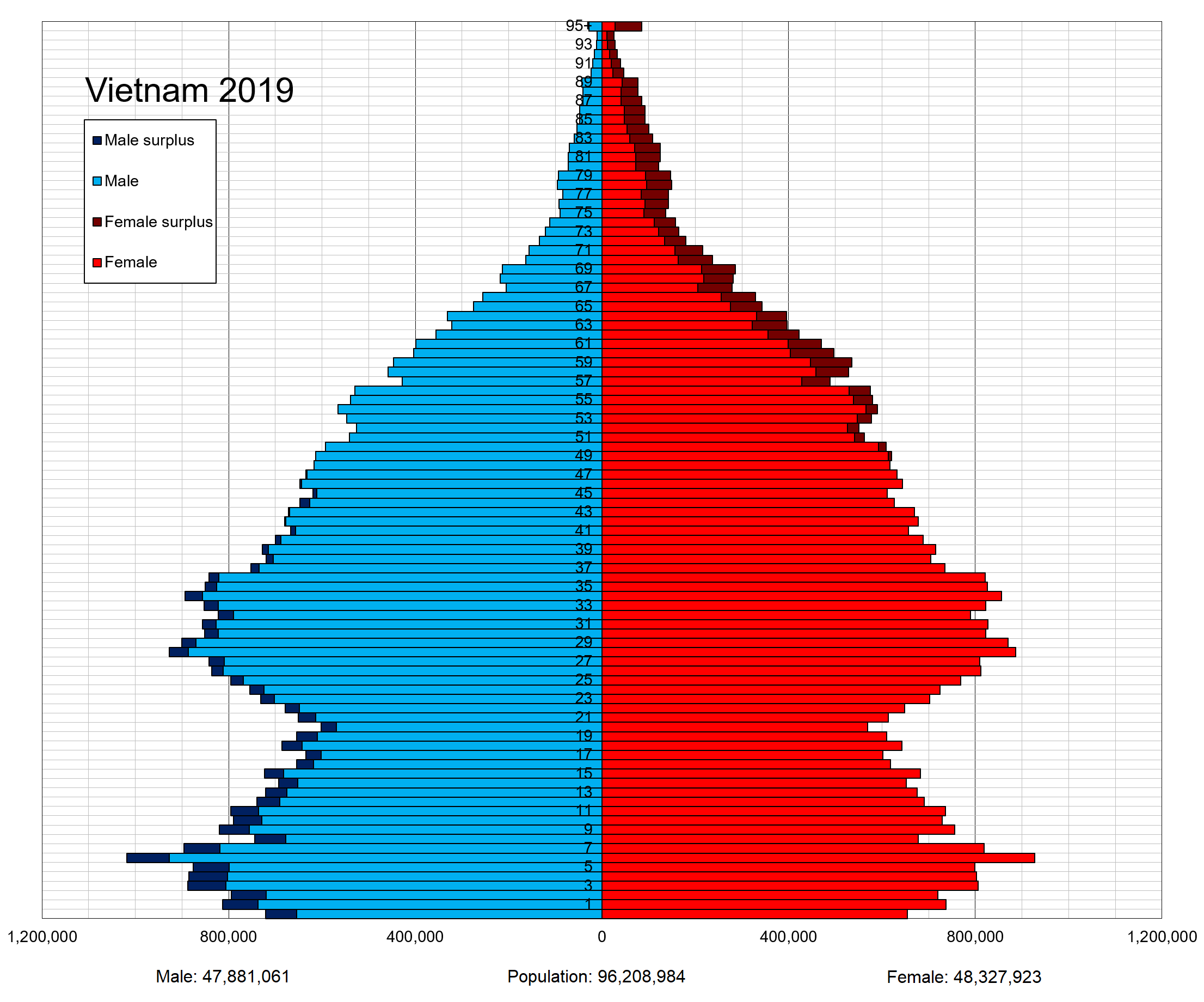
- Vietnam population pyramid in 2019
- Population: 102,300,000 (December 2025)
- Density: 310/km²
- Growth rate: 0.97% (2021 est.)
- Birth rate: 15.2 births/1000 population (2022 est.)
- Death rate: 6.1 deaths/1000 population (2022 est.)
- Life expectancy: 73.6 years (2022 est.)
  - male: 71.1 years (2022 est.)
  - female: 76.4 years (2022 est.)
- Fertility rate: 1.91 births/woman (2024)
- Infant mortality: 12.1 deaths/1000 live births (2022 est.)
- Net migration rate: −0.2 migrant(s)/1,000 population (2024 est.)

Age structure
- 0–14 years: 24% (2019)
- 15–64 years: 68.4% (2019)
- 65 and over: 7.6% (2019)

Sex ratio
- Total: 0.995 male(s)/female (2022)
- At birth: 1.116 male(s)/female (2022)
- Under 15: 1.1 male(s)/female
- 15–64 years: 1 male (s)/female
- 65 and over: 0.62 male(s)/female

Nationality
- Nationality: noun: Vietnamese (singular and plural) adjective: Vietnamese
- Major ethnic: Kinh (85.32%)
- Minor ethnic: Tay (1.92%); Thái (1.89%); Muong (1.51%); Hmong (1.45%); Khmers (1.37%); Nung (1.13%); Other groups (5.41%)

Language
- Official: Vietnamese language
- Spoken: Vietnamese and minority languages

Demographic features of the population of Vietnam include population density, ethnicity, education level, health of the populace, economic status, religious affiliations and other aspects of the population.

The majority Viet people (officially designated as Kinh) mostly live in the lowlands and speak Vietnamese, while other ethnic groups also speak a variety of languages; together, these communities contribute to the country's demographic composition. Originated from northern Vietnam, the Viets gradually settled southward, displacing ethnic groups including Chams and Khmer Krom.

Vietnam's population reached over 100 million in 2023, making it the 16th largest country by population in the world. It is predicted that by 2035, Vietnam will become an aged society.

== Population size and structure ==
Census population
Year	Pop.	±% p.a.
1950	28,264,000	—
1960	35,173,000	+2.21%
1970	44,928,000	+2.48%
1980	54,023,000	+1.86%
1989	64,411,713	+1.97%
1999	76,323,173	+1.71%
2009	85,846,997	+1.18%
2019	96,208,984	+1.15%
Source: UN / Central Statistics Office

=== Historic estimates ===
Year	Total population (excluding Champa and Khmer polities)	Notes
1000	ca. 1,200,000	
1100	ca. 1,500,000	
1200	ca. 2,000,000	
1300	ca. 2,400,000	
1400	1,800,000	
1500	4,400,000	(Note: Confer 1490 Dai Viet record which counts 7,950 xã (village-type communities). Li (1998) estimates 874,500 households and a population of approximately 4,372,500. Note that the fluctuating figures do not necessarily indicate population growth or decline, but rather reflect various contemporary factors such as degree of administrative power consolidation, stability, transportation, communication, rebellions, and diseases.)
1600	5,000,000	(Note: Confer 1634–1643 Northern Vietnam record which counts 8,671 xã, ~953,810 households (est.), and approximately 4,769,050 people (est.). Confer 1555 Central Vietnam record which counts 668 xã, ~75,680 households (est.), and approximately 378,400 people (est.).)
1700	6,300,000	(Note: Confer 1730 Northern Vietnam record which counts 11,766 xã, ~1,294,260 households (est.), and approximately 6,471,300 people (est.). Central Vietnam figures not available until 1777.)
1800	7,500,000	(Note: Confer 1810 Northern Vietnam record which counts 10,635 xã, ~1,169,850 households (est.), and approximately 5,849,250 people (est.). Confer 1777 Central Vietnam record which counts 1,436 xã, ~157,960 households (est.), and approximately 789,800 people (est.). Southern Vietnam population figures not available until 1819.)

Sources: Lieberman and Mokyr.

=== UN estimates ===
Year	Total population	Population in age bracket		
Year	Total population	aged 0–14	aged 15–64	aged 65+
1950	28,000,000	31.9%	63.9%	4.2%
1955	31,329,000	35.6%	60.1%	4.3%
1960	35,173,000	40.1%	55.5%	4.4%
1965	39,885,000	44.1%	51.3%	4.6%
1970	44,928,000	44.2%	50.9%	4.8%
1975	49,896,000	42.9%	52.3%	4.8%
1980	54,023,000	40.7%	54.3%	4.9%
1985	60,307,000	39.4%	55.7%	4.9%
1990	67,102,000	38.0%	57.0%	5.0%
1995	74,008,000	36.5%	58.4%	5.1%
2000	79,910,000	31.6%	62.0%	6.4%
2005	83,833,000	27.1%	66.4%	6.5%
2010	87,968,000	23.6%	69.9%	6.5%
2015	92,677,000	23.0%	70.3%	6.7%
2020	97,339,000	23.2%	68.9%	7.9%

=== Population by age groups ===
Population by Sex and Age Group (Census 01/04/2009):

Age group	Male	Female	Total	%
Total	42,413,143	43,433,854	85,846,997	100
0–4	3,662,889	3,371,255	7,034,144	7.97
5–9	3,458,159	3,252,578	6,710,737	7.82
10–14	3,725,369	3,523,009	7,248,378	8.44
15–19	4,577,914	4,385,988	8,963,902	10.44
20–24	4,253,618	4,179,249	8,432,867	9.82
25–29	3,904,730	3,885,273	7,790,003	9.07
30–34	3,462,905	3,405,253	6,868,158	8.00
35–39	3,298,266	3,233,341	6,531,607	7.61
40–44	2,967,934	2,998,922	5,966,856	6.95
45–49	2,642,466	2,808,462	5,450,928	6.35
50–54	2,082,098	2,329,953	4,412,051	5.14
55–59	1,364,319	1,620,300	2,984,619	3.48
60–64	861 897	1,076,051	1,937,948	2.26
65–69	653 287	901 391	1,554,678	1.81
70–74	568 312	844 226	1,412,538	1.65
75–79	480 088	718 805	1,198,893	1.40
80–84	264 997	460 988	725 985	0.85
85+	183 895	438 810	622 705	0.73
Age group	Male	Female	Total	Percent
0–4	10,846,417	10,146,842	20,993,259	24.45
15–64	29,416,147	29,922,792	59,338,939	69.12
65+	2,150,579	3,364,220	5,514,799	6.42

Population Estimates by Sex and Age Group (01/07/2014):

Age group	Male	Female	Total	%
Total	44,758,132	45,970,809	90,728,941	100
0–4	3,806,055	3,423,520	7,229,575	7.97
5–9	3,730,617	3,431,843	7,162,460	7.89
10–14	3,555,440	3,344,659	6,900,099	7.61
15–19	3,580,322	3,413,183	6,993,505	7.71
20–24	4,058,691	3,959,579	8,018,270	8.84
25–29	3,951,220	3,888,697	7,839,917	8.64
30–34	3,689,395	3,769,601	7,458,996	8.22
35–39	3,390,462	3,439,787	6,830,249	7.53
40–44	3,292,933	3,295,012	6,587,945	7.26
45–49	2,980,442	3,068,389	6,048,831	6.67
50–54	2,699,165	2,971,459	5,670,624	6.25
55–59	2,096,032	2,405,568	4,501,600	4.96
60–64	1,376,861	1,671,621	3,048,482	3.36
65–69	832 090	1,084,870	1,916,960	2.11
70–74	600 732	862 104	1,462,836	1.61
75–79	477 293	757 242	1,234,535	1.36
80+	640 382	1,183,675	1,824,057	2.01
Age group	Male	Female	Total	Percent
0–14	11,092,112	10,200,022	21,292,134	23.47
15–64	31,115,523	31,882,896	62,998,419	69.44
65+	2,550,497	3,887,891	6,438,388	7.10

Population by Sex and Age Group (Census 01/04/2019):

Age group	Male	Female	Total	%
Total	47,881,061	48,327,923	96,208,984	100
0–4	4,100,479	3,718,847	7,819,326	8.13
5–9	4,354,887	3,977,832	8,332,719	8.66
10–14	3,737,030	3,482,807	7,219,837	7.50
15–19	3,352,386	3,153,831	6,506,217	6.76
20–24	3,417,149	3,258,554	6,675,703	6.94
25–29	4,301,210	4,146,767	8,447,977	8.78
30–34	4,276,404	4,117,406	8,393,810	8.72
35–39	3,891,950	3,800,436	7,692,386	8.00
40–44	3,366,147	3,317,972	6,684,119	6.95
45–49	3,132,172	3,125,299	6,257,471	6.50
50–54	2,772,157	2,889,853	5,662,010	5.89
55–59	2,402,096	2,706,628	5,108,724	5.31
60–64	1,810,497	2,181,537	3,992,034	4.15
65–69	1,167,214	1,518,057	2,685,271	2.79
70–74	687 339	953 511	1,640,850	1.71
75–79	453 972	717 839	1,171,811	1.22
80–84	327 330	580 402	907 732	0.94
85+	330 642	680 345	1,010,987	1.05
Age group	Male	Female	Total	Percent
0–14	12,192,396	11,179,486	23,371,882	24.29
15–64	32,722,168	32,698,283	65,420,451	68.00
65+	2,966,497	4,350,211	7,416,651	7.71

Source: UN Statistics Division.

=== Sex ratio ===
Total: 0.995 male(s)/female
At birth: 1.116 male(s)/female
Under 15 years: 1.1 male(s)/female
15–64 years: 1 male(s)/female
65 years and over: 0.62 male(s)/female

Source: General Statistics Office of Vietnam.

=== UN estimates of births and deaths ===
Period	Live births per year	Deaths per year	Natural change per year	CBR^{1}	CDR^{1}	NC^{1}	TFR^{1}	IMR^{1}
1950–1955	1,335,000	722,000	613,000	44.8	24.2	20.6	6.20	157.9
1955–1960	1,533,000	764,000	769,000	46.1	23.0	23.1	6.76	143.7
1960–1965	1,732,000	790,000	942,000	46.2	21.0	25.2	7.33	130.3
1965–1970	1,798,000	790,000	1,009,000	42.4	18.6	23.8	7.38	117.8
1970–1975	1,853,000	859,000	994,000	39.1	18.1	21.0	7.15	118.4
1975–1980	1,797,000	760,000	1,036,000	34.6	14.6	20.0	5.89	97.6
1980–1985	1,952,000	630,000	1,322,000	34.1	11.0	23.1	4.93	70.0
1985–1990	2,000,000	574,000	1,425,000	31.4	9.0	22.4	3.96	54.8
1990–1995	1,929,000	484,000	1,444,000	27.3	6.9	20.4	3.23	37.9
1995–2000	1,448,000	441,000	1,007,000	19.0	5.8	13.2	2.18	29.2
2000–2005	1,392,000	425,000	967,000	16.9	5.5	11.4	1.92	23.1
2005–2010	1,472,000	448,000	1,024,000	17.3	5.6	11.7	1.93	20.4
2010–2015				17.4	5.8	11.6	1.96	
2015–2020				16.2	5.8	10.4	1.95	
2020–2025				15.2	6.0	9.2	1.93	
2025–2030				13.4	6.3	7.1	1.92	
2030–2035				12.1	6.7	5.4	1.92	
2035–2040				11.7	7.3	4.4	1.91	
^{1} CBR = crude birth rate (per 1000); CDR = crude death rate (per 1000); NC = natural change (per 1000); TFR = total fertility rate (number of children per woman); IMR = infant mortality rate per 1000 births

=== Registered births and deaths ===
The total fertility rate of Vietnam has been influenced by the government's family planning policy, the two-child policy.

	Average population	Live births	Deaths	Natural change	Crude birth rate (per 1000)	Crude death rate (per 1000)	Natural change (per 1000)	Crude migration change (per 1000)	Total fertility rate
1990	66,016,700								
1991	67,242,400								
1992	68,450,100								
1993	69,644,500								
1994	70,824,500								
1995	71,995,500								
1996	73,156,700								
1997	74,306,900								
1998	75,456,300								
1999	76,596,700								
2000	77,630,900								
2001	78,620,500	1,462,300	401,000	1,061,300	18.6	5.1	13.5		2.25
2002	79,537,700	1,511,200	461,300	1,049,900	19.0	5.8	13.2	−1.68	2.28
2003	80,467,400	1,408,200	466,700	941,500	17.5	5.8	11.7	−0.15	2.12
2004	81,436,400	1,563,600	439,800	1,123,800	19.2	5.4	13.8	−1.92	2.23
2005	82,392,100	1,532,500	436,700	1,095,800	18.6	5.3	13.3	−1.72	2.11
2006	83,311,200	1,449,600	441,500	1,008,100	17.4	5.3	12.1	−1.08	2.09
2007	84,218,500	1,423,300	446,400	976,900	16.9	5.3	11.6	−0.84	2.07
2008	85,118,700	1,421,500	451,100	970,400	16.7	5.3	11.4	−0.83	2.08
2009	86,025,000	1,514,000	585,000	929,000	17.6	6.8	10.8	−0.27	2.03
2010	86,947,400	1,486,800	591,200	895,600	17.1	6.8	10.3	0.31	2.00
2011	87,860,400	1,458,500	606,200	852,300	16.6	6.9	9.7	0.20	1.99
2012	88,809,300	1,500,900	621,700	879,200	16.9	7.0	9.9	0.79	2.05
2013	89,759,500	1,525,900	637,300	888,600	17.0	7.1	9.9	0.69	2.10
2014	90,728,900	1,560,500	626,000	934,500	17.2	6.9	10.3	0.39	2.09
2015	91,709,800	1,485,700	623,600	862,100	16.2	6.8	9.4	1.31	2.10
2016	92,692,200	1,483,100	630,300	852,800	16.0	6.8	9.2	1.41	2.09
2017	93,671,600	1,395,700	637,000	758,700	14.9	6.8	8.1	2.38	2.04
2018	94,666,000	1,382,100	643,700	738,400	14.6	6.8	7.8	2.73	2.05
2019	96,484,000	1,572,700	607,800	964,900	16.3	6.3	10.0	9.01	2.09
2020	97,582,690	1,590,600	591,400	999,200	16.3	6.1	10.2	1.03	2.12
2021	98,506,190	1,550,500	628,700	922,000	15.7	6.4	9.3	0.02	2.11
2022	99,461,700	1,511,800	606,700	905,100	15.2	6.1	9.1	0.51	2.01
2023	100,309,200	1,424,400	571,800	852,600	14.2	5.7	8.5	−0.05	1.96
2024	101,300,000	1,367,600	567,300	800,300	13.5	5.6	7.9	1.90	1.91
2025	102,300,000	1,397,000	620,000	777,000	13.7	6.1	7.6		1.93
2026									

Source: General Statistics Office of Vietnam.

=== Fertility rate ===
==== By region and province ====
Province	2005	2007	2008	2009	2010	2011	2012	2013	2014	2015	2016	2017	2018	2019	2020	2021
Vietnam	2.11	2.07	2.08	2.03	2.00	1.99	2.05	2.10	2.09	2.10	2.09	2.04	2.05	2.09	2.12	2.11
Red River Delta	2.06	2.11	2.13	2.11	2.04	2.06	2.11	2.11	2.30	2.23	2.23	2.16	2.29	2.35	2.34	2.37
Hà Nội	1.83	1.91	2.06	2.08	2.00	2.02	2.06	2.03	2.18	2.04	2.06	2.00	2.07	2.24	2.25	2.18
Hà Tây (merged to Hà Nội by 2008)	2.29	2.23	..	..	..	..	..	..	..	..	..	..	..	..	..	..
Vĩnh Phúc	2.15	2.00	2.10	2.13	2.06	2.02	2.07	2.11	2.44	2.25	2.48	2.34	2.48	2.39	2.39	2.37
Bắc Ninh	2.40	2.28	2.29	2.32	2.26	2.23	2.71	2.29	2.72	2.72	2.63	2.67	2.66	2.53	2.49	2.60
Quảng Ninh	2.24	2.12	2.12	2.20	1.99	2.07	2.27	2.18	2.49	2.20	2.02	2.25	2.22	2.24	2.22	2.14
Hải Dương	2.10	2.04	2.13	1.99	1.98	2.01	2.07	1.99	2.06	2.00	2.30	1.95	2.59	2.48	2.57	2.44
Hải Phòng	2.13	1.86	1.95	2.16	1.98	2.00	2.37	2.03	2.35	2.02	2.11	1.99	1.92	2.20	2.05	2.35
Hưng Yên	2.32	2.08	2.25	2.11	2.13	2.19	2.10	2.46	2.29	2.40	2.37	2.10	2.39	2.40	2.40	2.43
Thái Bình	2.19	2.21	2.14	2.08	2.10	2.15	1.78	2.07	1.87	2.39	2.25	2.21	2.51	2.43	2.42	2.58
Hà Nam	2.30	2.18	2.12	2.07	2.09	2.16	1.83	1.87	1.99	2.22	2.11	1.97	2.39	2.44	2.36	2.35
Nam Định	2.31	2.39	2.19	2.25	2.20	2.24	1.76	2.32	2.73	2.81	2.46	2.58	2.82	2.74	2.71	2.75
Ninh Bình	2.37	2.26	2.36	2.04	1.88	1.86	2.66	2.28	2.87	2.76	2.94	2.39	2.53	2.46	2.42	2.41
Northern midlands and mountain areas	2.33	2.23	2.30	2.24	2.22	2.21	2.31	2.18	2.56	2.69	2.63	2.53	2.48	2.43	2.41	2.43
Hà Giang	3.06	2.89	2.86	3.08	3.05	2.57	2.78	2.70	2.51	2.93	2.42	2.49	2.74	2.47	2.57	2.62
Cao Bằng	2.55	2.28	2.26	2.18	2.09	2.15	2.13	2.05	2.53	2.52	2.46	2.34	2.48	2.43	2.42	2.40
Bắc Kạn	2.29	2.12	2.07	1.84	1.85	1.91	2.30	2.11	2.07	2.42	2.40	2.37	2.23	2.14	2.14	2.22
Tuyên Quang	2.17	2.05	2.05	2.10	2.07	2.10	2.18	2.35	2.73	2.74	2.72	2.68	2.62	2.51	2.50	2.42
Lào Cai	2.97	2.59	2.69	2.70	2.73	2.57	2.43	2.52	2.36	2.26	2.73	2.24	2.43	2.44	2.43	2.40
Yên Bái	2.55	2.36	2.56	2.38	2.32	2.26	2.38	2.13	2.77	2.76	2.89	2.77	2.96	2.74	2.64	2.77
Thái Nguyên	1.99	1.99	1.95	1.89	1.90	1.96	2.13	2.06	2.45	2.52	2.45	2.09	2.05	2.14	2.16	2.12
Lạng Sơn	2.28	2.14	2.15	1.86	1.84	1.88	2.11	1.86	2.26	2.38	2.34	2.25	2.22	2.13	2.19	2.32
Bắc Giang	2.21	2.07	2.22	1.94	1.86	1.94	2.09	1.77	2.57	2.77	2.64	2.73	2.38	2.31	2.30	2.32
Phú Thọ	2.03	1.99	2.11	2.10	2.08	2.22	2.18	2.22	2.51	2.61	2.56	2.51	2.66	2.57	2.53	2.42
Điện Biên	3.17	2.72	2.72	2.55	2.57	2.67	2.76	2.48	3.11	2.81	2.43	2.84	2.78	2.72	2.66	2.70
Lai Châu	3.52	3.02	3.01	2.96	2.91	2.93	2.60	2.45	3.20	3.11	2.91	2.86	2.60	2.68	2.63	2.77
Sơn La	2.76	2.36	2.29	2.61	2.58	2.43	2.52	2.25	2.57	2.82	2.90	2.77	2.36	2.44	2.36	2.36
Hòa Bình	2.09	2.06	2.01	1.98	1.98	2.03	2.08	1.90	2.30	2.84	2.56	2.30	2.42	2.34	2.29	2.19
North Central and Central coastal areas	2.37	2.27	2.30	2.21	2.21	2.21	2.32	2.37	2.31	2.34	2.37	2.31	2.30	2.32	2.31	2.32
Thanh Hóa	2.39	2.12	2.17	1.89	1.89	2.01	2.22	2.11	2.43	2.75	2.70	2.45	2.69	2.54	2.51	2.22
Nghệ An	2.75	2.49	2.52	2.55	2.56	2.49	2.59	2.68	2.70	2.69	2.76	2.87	2.82	2.75	2.68	2.63
Hà Tĩnh	2.38	2.46	2.65	2.46	2.46	2.50	2.75	2.95	3.12	2.65	3.21	3.24	2.90	2.83	2.73	2.95
Quảng Bình	2.58	2.57	2.57	2.37	2.39	2.41	2.61	2.22	2.49	2.52	2.38	2.34	2.41	2.43	2.40	2.52
Quảng Trị	2.90	2.77	2.71	2.85	2.84	2.67	2.65	2.75	2.75	2.94	3.19	2.83	2.61	2.45	2.44	2.46
Thừa Thiên–Huế	2.98	2.79	2.54	2.26	2.28	2.22	2.38	2.21	2.33	2.26	2.20	2.33	2.03	2.34	2.29	2.25
Đà Nẵng	1.87	1.90	1.92	2.14	2.16	1.99	2.18	2.32	2.03	2.13	2.24	1.81	1.49	1.88	2.09	2.02
Quảng Nam	2.40	2.32	2.12	2.30	2.27	2.16	2.35	2.65	2.27	2.17	2.16	2.26	2.28	2.27	2.23	2.25
Quảng Ngãi	2.21	2.11	2.18	2.09	2.11	2.21	2.13	2.45	2.01	1.93	1.98	1.79	2.06	2.13	2.11	2.14
Bình Định	2.25	2.17	2.09	2.22	2.17	2.28	2.26	2.55	2.29	2.14	2.00	2.09	2.30	2.20	2.24	2.22
Phú Yên	2.25	2.18	2.32	1.96	1.98	2.11	2.07	2.04	2.15	2.05	2.26	2.04	2.16	2.11	2.09	2.07
Khánh Hòa	2.12	2.14	2.18	2.04	2.06	1.93	2.04	2.04	1.65	1.75	1.75	1.64	1.40	1.77	1.81	1.82
Ninh Thuận	2.53	2.28	2.24	2.40	2.42	2.38	2.25	2.37	2.18	2.23	2.28	2.34	2.05	2.09	2.07	2.36
Bình Thuận	2.38	2.40	2.38	2.07	2.09	2.14	2.39	2.15	1.57	2.04	1.81	1.75	1.82	1.91	1.96	2.06
Central Highlands	3.07	2.77	2.68	2.65	2.63	2.58	2.43	2.49	2.30	2.26	2.37	2.29	2.32	2.43	2.41	2.36
Kon Tum	3.94	3.49	3.58	3.45	3.46	3.25	3.16	2.70	3.04	2.49	2.34	2.48	2.12	2.74	2.64	2.55
Gia Lai	3.10	2.97	2.86	2.88	2.90	2.85	2.36	2.48	2.27	2.45	2.38	2.36	2.27	2.49	2.47	2.44
Đắk Lắk	2.98	2.84	2.57	2.45	2.47	2.42	2.31	2.70	2.25	2.22	2.43	2.19	2.41	2.37	2.36	2.15
Đắk Nông	3.38	3.05	2.87	2.72	2.68	2.57	2.65	2.31	2.46	2.36	2.28	2.21	3.05	2.68	2.61	2.68
Lâm Đồng	2.67	2.37	2.31	2.43	2.28	2.32	2.36	2.24	2.09	1.98	2.34	2.29	1.99	2.20	2.19	2.15
South East	1.85	1.74	1.73	1.69	1.68	1.59	1.57	1.83	1.56	1.63	1.46	1.55	1.50	1.56	1.62	1.61
Bình Phước	2.61	2.47	2.38	2.45	2.43	2.31	2.22	2.43	2.30	2.05	1.92	2.02	1.99	2.27	2.25	2.21
Tây Ninh	1.98	1.89	1.79	1.79	1.77	1.80	1.93	1.78	1.76	1.88	1.76	1.66	1.46	1.53	1.67	1.65
Bình Dương	1.66	1.74	1.85	1.70	1.72	1.76	1.70	1.78	1.44	1.59	1.61	1.90	1.53	1.54	1.63	1.62
Đồng Nai	1.92	1.91	1.83	2.07	2.09	1.99	1.80	2.09	1.75	2.02	1.67	1.61	1.80	1.90	1.97	1.86
Bà Rịa–Vũng Tàu	2.06	2.09	2.13	2.01	1.88	1.82	1.70	1.92	1.97	1.56	1.52	1.37	1.51	1.87	1.94	1.78
TP. Hồ Chí Minh	1.52	1.49	1.63	1.45	1.45	1.30	1.33	1.68	1.39	1.45	1.24	1.36	1.33	1.39	1.53	1.48
Mekong River Delta	2.00	1.87	1.87	1.84	1.80	1.80	1.92	1.92	1.84	1.76	1.84	1.74	1.74	1.80	1.82	1.82
Long An	1.95	1.91	1.95	1.85	1.87	1.83	2.02	2.03	1.66	1.61	1.56	1.62	1.83	1.80	1.82	1.77
Tiền Giang	2.02	1.98	1.97	1.94	1.93	1.92	1.79	1.78	1.75	1.62	2.00	1.99	1.68	1.82	1.85	1.83
Bến Tre	1.76	1.70	1.71	1.81	1.79	1.71	2.20	1.98	1.89	1.97	1.90	1.88	1.88	1.86	1.87	1.64
Trà Vinh	2.03	1.89	1.79	1.86	1.80	1.80	2.06	1.89	1.94	2.04	2.36	2.25	1.94	1.96	2.00	1.99
Vĩnh Long	1.83	1.76	1.75	1.63	1.65	1.63	2.14	2.02	1.98	1.61	2.03	1.67	1.83	1.81	1.82	1.81
Đồng Tháp	1.98	1.77	1.74	1.87	1.89	1.83	1.57	1.89	1.84	1.61	1.59	1.34	1.43	1.78	1.87	1.85
An Giang	2.00	1.86	1.86	1.97	1.97	1.92	2.17	2.07	2.10	1.73	1.84	1.77	1.78	1.85	1.90	1.94
Kiên Giang	2.22	2.10	2.09	1.84	1.80	1.86	2.16	1.98	1.96	2.05	1.94	1.87	1.96	1.85	1.98	1.91
Cần Thơ	1.70	1.64	1.75	1.72	1.62	1.62	1.58	1.81	1.89	1.88	2.01	1.64	1.66	1.66	1.74	1.68
Hậu Giang	1.95	1.94	1.89	1.96	1.75	1.77	1.78	1.78	1.61	1.64	1.48	1.53	1.64	1.83	1.84	1.83
Sóc Trăng	2.02	1.90	2.06	1.79	1.81	1.83	1.85	2.08	1.65	1.72	1.83	1.69	1.75	1.79	1.80	1.78
Bạc Liêu	2.11	2.10	2.00	1.75	1.59	1.69	1.97	1.82	1.82	1.67	1.63	1.77	1.54	1.61	1.66	1.56
Cà Mau	2.10	2.00	2.01	1.75	1.64	1.73	1.62	1.70	1.65	1.80	1.85	1.65	1.75	1.80	1.85	1.86

Source: General Statistics Office of Vietnam.

==== Before 1950 ====
Years	1900	1901	1902	1903	1904	1905	1906	1907	1908	1909
Total Fertility Rate in Vietnam	4.70	4.66	4.62	4.57	4.53	4.49	4.45	4.41	4.36	4.32

Years	1910	1911	1912	1913	1914	1915	1916	1917	1918	1919
Total Fertility Rate in Vietnam	4.28	4.24	4.20	4.15	4.15	4.42	4.42	4.69	4.69	4.29

Years	1920	1921	1922	1923	1924	1925	1926	1927	1928	1929
Total Fertility Rate in Vietnam	4.15	4.29	4.69	4.49	4.76	4.73	4.70	4.70	4.66	4.78

Years	1930	1931	1932	1933	1934	1935	1936	1937	1938	1939
Total Fertility Rate in Vietnam	5.03	4.69	4.69	4.73	5.19	4.92	4.97	5.04	5.03	5.03

Years	1940	1941	1942	1943	1944	1945	1946	1947	1948	1949
Total Fertility Rate in Vietnam	5.02	5.02	5.01	5.00	5.00	4.99	4.99	4.98	4.97	4.97

=== Life expectancy ===
Life expectancy in Vietnam since 1950

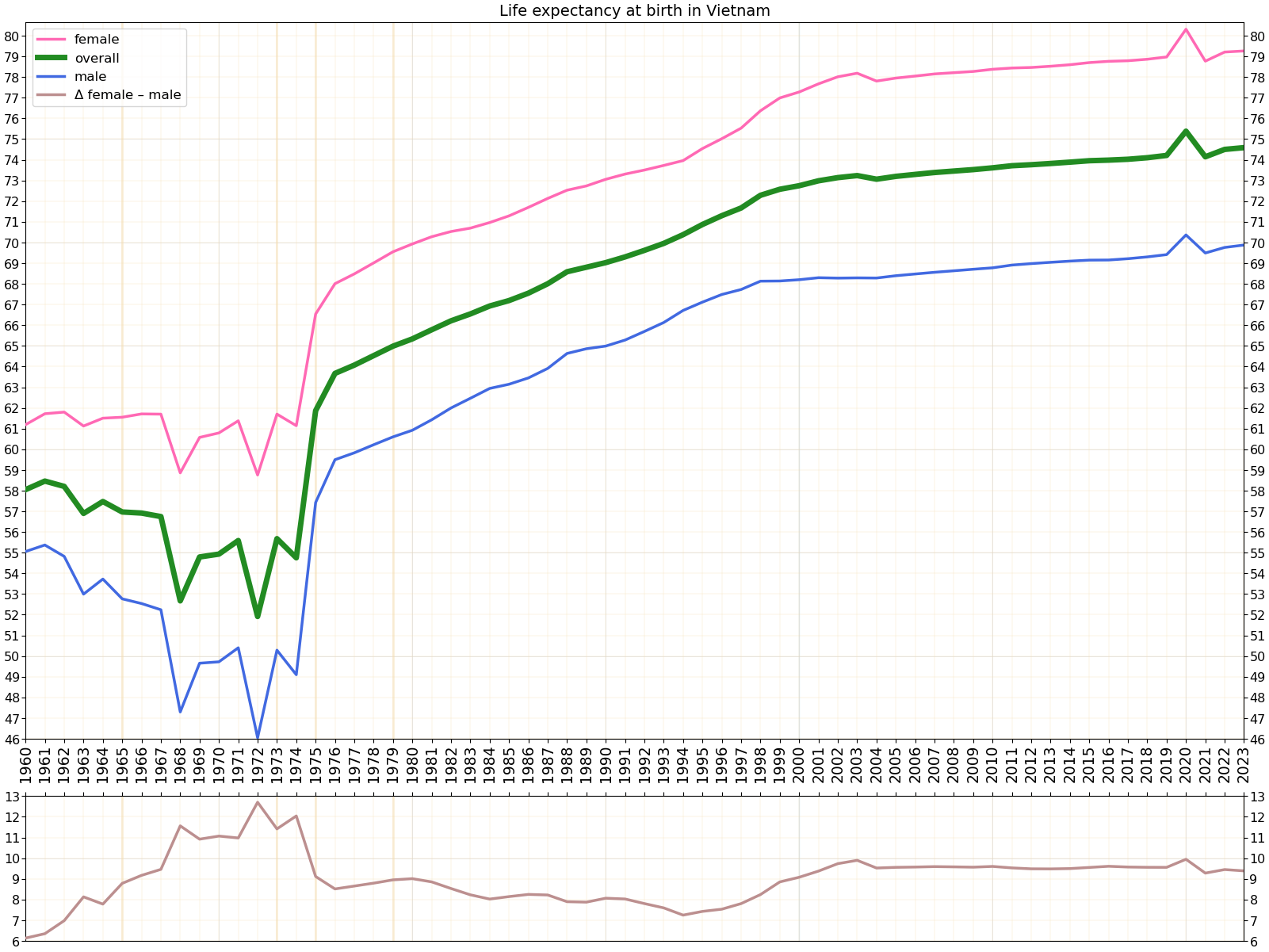
Life expectancy in Vietnam since 1960 by gender

Period	Life expectancy in Years	Period	Life expectancy in Years
1955–1960	57.3	1990–1995	71.2
1960–1965	60.5	1995–2000	72.7
1965–1970	62.3	2000–2005	73.8
1970–1975	57.8	2005–2010	74.7
1975–1980	66.1	2010–2015	75.6
1980–1985	68.1		

Source: UN World Population Prospects.

== Ethnic groups ==
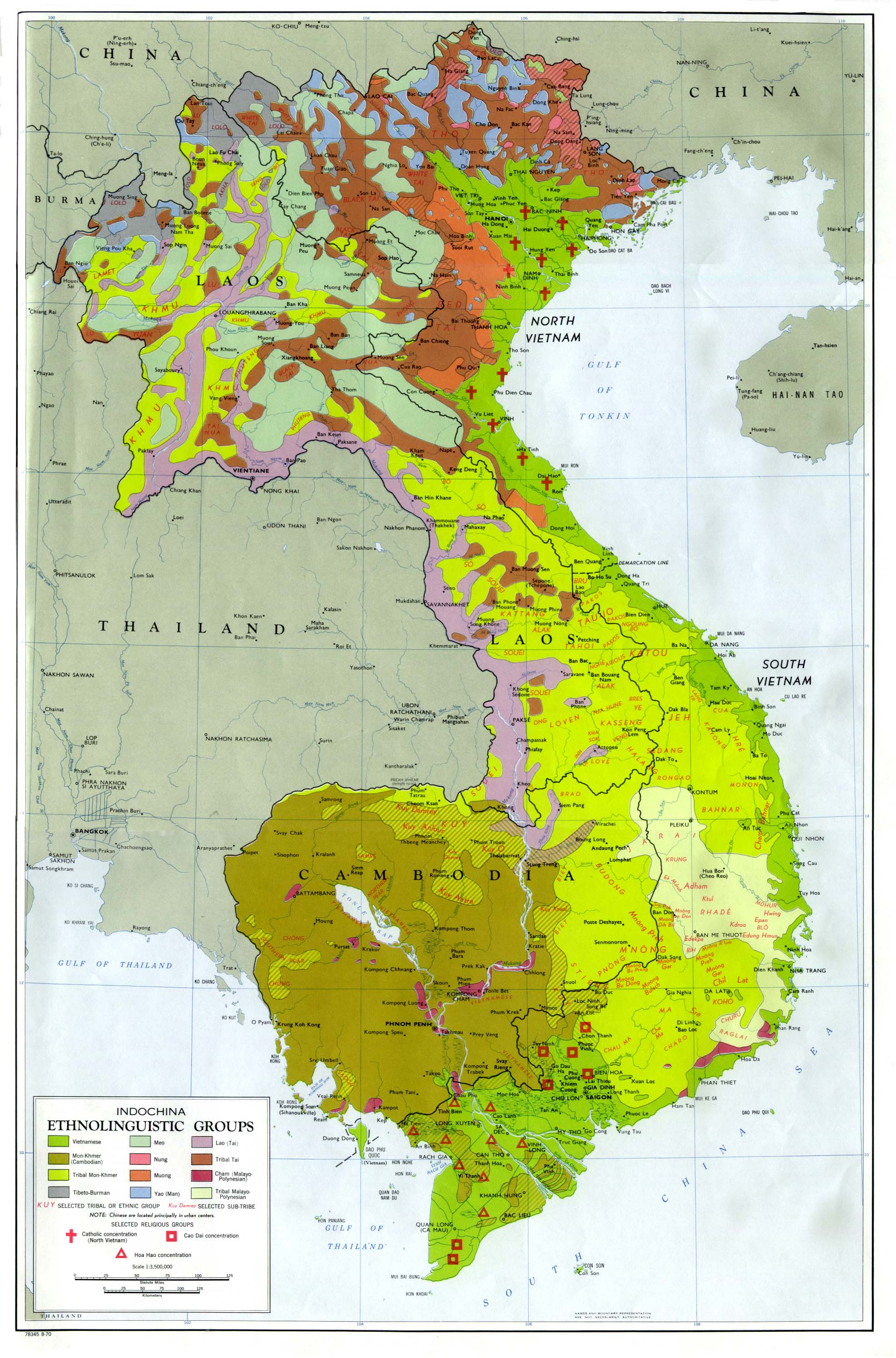
Ethnolinguistic map of Cambodia, Laos, and Vietnam in 1970. Note that ethnic composition has changed since due to internal migration.

The Vietnamese government recognizes 54 ethnic groups, of which the Viet (Kinh) is the largest; according to official Vietnamese figures (2019 census), which account for 85.3% of the country's population and the non-Viet ethnic groups account for the remaining portion.

The relation between China and Vietnam declined following reunification in 1976, with Vietnam siding with the Soviet Union against China in the Sino-Soviet split. In 1978–79, some 450,000 ethnic Chinese left Vietnam by boat as refugees (some officially encouraged and assisted) or were expelled across the land border with China. The government has performed an about turn and is encouraging overseas Hoa to return and invest, while the ethnic Chinese population has been in decline since the 1970s due to assimilation and lower birth rates.

The central highland peoples, termed Degar or Montagnards (mountain people), comprise two main ethnolinguistic groups – Malayo-Polynesian and Mon–Khmer. About 30 groups of cultures and dialects are spread over the highland territory.

Other minority groups include the Cham – remnants of the Champa kingdom, conquered by the Viet in the 15th century, Hmong, and Thái.

Population of Vietnam according to ethnic group 1989–2019
Ethnic group	Language family	census 1989		census 1999		census 2009		census 2019	
Ethnic group	Language family	Number	%	Number	%	Number	%	Number	%
Kinh	Vietic	56,101,583	87.1	65,795,748	86.2	73,594,427	85.7	82,085,826	85.32
Tày	Kra–Dai	1,145,235	1.8	1,477,514	1.9	1,626,392	1.9	1,845,492	1.92
Thai	Kra–Dai	992,809	1.5	1,328,725	1.7	1,550,423	1.8	1,820,950	1.89
Mường	Vietic	874,195	1.4	1,137,515	1.5	1,268,963	1.5	1,452,095	1.51
Hmong	Hmong–Mien			787,604	1.0	1,068,189	1.2	1,393,547	1.45
Khmer	Mon–Khmer	872,382	1.4	1,055,174	1.4	1,260,640	1.5	1,319,652	1.37
Nùng	Kra–Dai	696,305	1.1	856,412	1.1	968,800	1.1	1,083,298	1.13
Dao	Hmong–Mien			620,538	0.81	751,067	0.87	891,151	0.93
Hoa	Chinese	961,702	1.5	862,371	1.1	823,071	1.0	749,466	0.78
Gia Rai	Malayo-Polynesian			317,557	0.42	411,275	0.48	513,930	0.53
Ê Đê	Malayo-Polynesian			270,348	0.35	331,194	0.39	398,671	0.41
Ba Na	Mon–Khmer			174,456	0.23	227,716	0.27	286,910	0.30
Xơ Đăng	Mon–Khmer			127,148	0.17	169,501	0.20	212,277	0.22
Sán Chay	Kra–Dai			147,315	0.19	169,410	0.20	201,398	0.21
Cờ Ho	Mon–Khmer			128,723	0.17	166,112	0.19	200,800	0.21
Sán Dìu	Chinese			126,237	0.17	146,821	0.17	183,004	0.19
Chăm	Malayo-Polynesian			132,873	0.17	161,729	0.19	178,948	0.19
Hrê	Mon–Khmer			113,111	0.15	63,012	0.07	149,460	0.16
Ra Glai	Malayo-Polynesian			96,931	0.13	122,245	0.14	146,613	0.15
M'Nông	Mon–Khmer			92,451	0.12	102,741	0.12	127,334	0.13
Xtiêng	Mon–Khmer			66,788	0.09	85,436	0.10	100,752	0.10
Bru-Vân Kiều	Mon–Khmer			55,559	0.07	74,506	0.09	94,598	0.10
Thổ	Vietic			68,394	0.09	74,458	0.09	91,430	0.10
Khơ Mú	Mon–Khmer			56,542	0.07	72,929	0.08	90,612	0.09
Cơ Tu	Mon–Khmer			50,458	0.07	61,588	0.07	74,173	0.08
Giáy	Kra–Dai			49,098	0.06	58,617	0.07	67,858	0.07
Giẻ Triêng	Mon–Khmer			30,243	0.04	50,962	0.06	63,322	0.07
Tà Ôi	Mon–Khmer			34,960	0.05	43,886	0.05	52,356	0.05
Mạ	Mon–Khmer			33,338	0.04	41,405	0.05	50,322	0.05
Co	Mon–Khmer			27,766	0.04	33,817	0.04	40,442	0.04
Chơ Ro	Mon–Khmer			22,567	0.03	26,855	0.03	29,520	0.03
Xinh Mun	Mon–Khmer			18,018	0.02	23,278	0.03	29,503	0.03
Hà Nhì	Tibeto-Burman			17,535	0.02	10,923	0.01	25,539	0.03
Chu Ru	Malayo-Polynesian			14,978	0.02	19,314	0.02	23,242	0.02
Lao	Kra–Dai			11,611	0.02	14,928	0.02	17,532	0.02
Kháng	Mon–Khmer			10,272	0.01	13,840	0.02	16,180	0.02
La Chí	Kra–Dai			10,765	0.01	13,158	0.02	15,126	0.02
Phù Lá	Tibeto-Burman			9,046	0.01	5,535	0.01	12,471	0.01
La Hủ	Tibeto-Burman			6,874	0.01	9,651	0.01	12,113	0.01
La Ha	Kra–Dai			5,686	0.01	8,177	0.01	10,157	0.01
Pà Thẻn	Hmong–Mien			5,569	0.01	6,811	0.01	8,248	0.01
Chứt	Vietic			3,829	0.01	6,022	0.01	7,513	0.01
Lự	Kra–Dai			4,964	0.01	5,601	0.01	6,757	0.01
Lô Lô	Tibeto-Burman			3,307	0.00	2,218	0.00	4,827	0.01
Mảng	Mon–Khmer			2,663	0.00	3,700	0.00	4,650	0.00
Cờ Lao	Kra–Dai			1,865	0.00	2,636	0.00	4,003	0.00
Bố Y	Kra–Dai			1,864	0.00	2,273	0.00	3,232	0.00
Cống	Tibeto-Burman			1,676	0.00	2,029	0.00	2,729	0.00
Ngái	Chinese			4,841	0.01	1,035	0.00	1,649	0.00
Si La	Tibeto-Burman			840	0.00	709	0.00	909	0.00
Pu Péo	Kra–Dai			705	0.00	687	0.00	903	0.00
Rơ Măm	Mon–Khmer			352	0.00	436	0.00	639	0.00
Brâu	Mon–Khmer			313	0.00	397	0.00	525	0.00
Ơ Đu	Mon–Khmer			301	0.00	376	0.00	428	0.00
Foreigners				39,532	0.05	2,134	0.00	3,553	0.00
Others		2,767,512	4.3	1,333	0.0	82,942	0.0	349	0.00
Total		64,411,713		76,323,173		85,846,997		96,208,984	

== Languages ==
Vietnamese is the national language. It belongs to the Austroasiatic language family, which also includes languages such as Khmer and Mon. Vietnamese was spoken by 85–90 million people in Vietnam based on the 1999 census. Vietnamese is a tonal, monosyllabic language. Vietnamese was influenced by Chinese, with up to around 50–70% words having Chinese origins. Since the 20th century, the Vietnamese have used a Romanized script introduced by the French, developed by Jesuit missionaries led by Alexandre de Rhodes and later on, refined by Vietnamese scholars to produce what is later known as the Vietnamese alphabet.

== Religion ==
Religion in Vietnam (2019)
1. Vietnamese folk religion or non-religious (86.3%)
2. Catholicism (6.10%)
3. Buddhism (4.79%)
4. Hoahaoism (1.02%)
5. Protestantism (1.00%)
6. Others (0.77%)

According to the 2019 Census, the religious demographics of Vietnam are as follows:

- 86.32% Vietnamese folk religion or non-religious
- 6.1% Catholicism
- 4.79% Buddhism (mainly Mahayana)
- 1.02% Hoahaoism
- 1% Protestantism
- <1% Caodaism
- 0.77 Others

It is noted here that the data is skewed, as a majority of Vietnamese may declare themselves atheist yet practice forms of traditional folk religion or Mahayana Buddhism.

Estimates for the year 2010 published by the Pew Research Center:

- Vietnamese folk religion, 45.3%
- Unaffiliated, 29.6%
- Buddhism, 16.4%
- Christianity, 8.2%
- Other, 0.5%

== See also ==
- Culture of Vietnam
- Racism in Vietnam
- Vietnamese diaspora

== Sources ==
- 1999 Census results
- 2006 Vietnam's population estimates
- Socioeconomic Atlas of Vietnam
