= Kamayurá language =

Tupian language spoken in Brazil

Kamayurá
- Tupi–Guarani subgroup VII
- Native to: Brazil
- Region: Mato Grosso: Upper Xingu region of the Xingu Indigenous Park
- Ethnicity: Kamayurá people
- Native speakers: 600 (2014)
- Language family: Tupian: Tupi–Guaraní; Kamayurá

Language codes
- ISO 639-3: kay
- Glottolog: kama1373
- ELP: Kamayurá
- Linguasphere: 88-AAC-aa

Kamayurá (Kamaiurá in Portuguese) is an Indigenous language of Brazil and a member of the Tupi–Guarani family, spoken by the Kamayurá people of Brazil, who numbered about 600 individuals in 2014. The Kamayurá people live in the Mato Grosso region of Brazil, specifically in the Upper Xingu area.

== Documentation ==
Currently, there are many works of the Kamayurá language. Lucy Seki, a Brazilian linguist, is credited with the completion of a book detailing the grammar of the Kamayurá language, as well as the publication of a number of other works on Kamayurá. Through her work with the Kamayurá, she also earned the status of an honorary member in the Linguistic Society of America. In an interview done by “Nova Raiz” in September 2011, Seki had apparently retired, but continued to speak positively of her work with the Kamayurá.

== Usage ==
=== Education ===
The Kamayurá people do not have their own specific schools and rely on teaching each other the language; however, there have been a couple of youths, since 2000, that have participated in the Teacher Training Course. The Teacher Training Course strives to keep Kamayurá alive as well as educates individuals in Portuguese.

== Phonology ==
=== Vowels ===
Vowel Phonemes
		Front	Central/Back	
		Front	unrounded	rounded
High	oral	i	ɨ	u
High	nasal	ĩ	ɨ̃	ũ
Mid/Low	oral	ɛ	a	ɔ
Mid/Low	nasal	ɛ̃	ã	ɔ̃

The mid vowels will be written ⟨e, o⟩ below.

=== Consonants ===
Consonant Phonemes
	Bilabial	Dental	Alveolar	Palatal	Velar		Glottal	
	Bilabial	Dental	Alveolar	Palatal	plain	lab.	plain	lab.
Obstruent	p	t̪	ts	j ([c]~[ɟ]~[ɲ])	k	kʷ	ʔ	
Nasal	m	n̪		j ([c]~[ɟ]~[ɲ])	ŋ			
Approximant				j ([c]~[ɟ]~[ɲ])		w ([β])	h	hʷ ([ɸ])
Tap			ɾ					

The "glottal approximants" /h/ and /hʷ/ assume the quality of the following vowel.

The tap will be written ⟨r⟩ below.

== Morphology ==
Kamayurá is one of the few languages in the world with two mechanisms for causation that differ in how involved the causer is in the action. The prefix mo- indicates that the causer was not involved in the activity ("he stopped in the canoe when he was outside it") while the prefix (e)ro- expresses that it was involved ("he stopped in the canoe when he was inside it"). This is common in general in the languages of the Tupian stock, and both causatives have been posited to exist in Proto-Tupian.

In the Kamayurá language, affixes, clitics, order of constituents, postpositions, derivational processes and certain particles are all needed in order to express the syntactic and semantic functions of the noun.

- Affixes: a set of casual suffixes that indicate the noun in a nuclear function, locative, attributive, and external, and a set of relational prefixes including prefixes which encode the specified and indefinite third-person, reflexive and non-reflexive as well as the subject and object of the third person.
- Clitics: there are a set of flexible clitics which indicates a person and the number of the possessor as well as the subject of the object of verbs and postpositions.
- Order of constituents: are relevant to distinguish “a” (feminine the) and “o” (masculine the) when both are expressed by nominal, both receive the same suffix [-a]. The basic order of the constituents are “AOV” in the transitive sentence and “SV” in the intransitive sentences, which vary in certain contexts.
- Postpositions: Postpositions are used to express a variety of syntactic and semantic functions.
- Derivational Processes: there are a series of derivational affixes which form complex nominal from verbs and adverbs and of which are used to indicate syntactic and semantics roles of the noun.
- Particles: Certain particles are used to indicate semantic/syntactic roles of the noun. There are several relations that are expressed in Portuguese by nominal or postpositional phrases which in Kamayurá, are expressed by adverbs and other types of constructions.

=== Pronouns ===
Personal pronouns present certain characteristics which justify its treatment separately. It constitutes a closed class of elements, which unlike nouns, do not receive casual suffixes. There are two different pronouns with syntactic distribution consistently distinct, these are: the series of free pronouns and the series of clitic pronouns which are described below:

==== Free personal pronouns ====
These are accented and syntactically occur in the following functions, and do not occur in subordinate sentences and also not as the possessor with nouns or as object of postpositions. There are also restrictions of the use of these pronouns in copulative sentences:

A: kunuʔum/ ne =upe a-ʔe
{} boy 2SG =DAT {1SG-to say}
"Hey boy, I am talking to you"

B: awa/ ije
“Who, me?”

ije morerekʷat
am boss
“I am boss”

ije a- jeʔeŋ ene ere- karãj
I 1SG- talk you 2SG- write
“I talk and you write”

ore t -oro -jomono
1EXCL EXH -1EXCL -go
“we are who goes”

ene ruẽj oro-etsak
you NEG 1/2-see
“it is not you who I see”

==== Clitic pronouns ====
These are not used alone, but they always appear syntactically linked to other elements occurring in the following functions.

je =r -ekowe
1SG =REL -heart
“my heart”

je =r -ehe
1SG =REL -because
“because of me”

je =Ø -katu
1SG =REL {-be good}
“I am good”

je =r -etsak
1SG =REL -see
“You see me”

je =tsaro =k ne= mano -ramuẽ aʔe =wa jɨjrɨp -Ø
1SG =get =VOL 2S= die -SBJV NINTERR =MS friend -Ø
“Come get me when you die, friend!”

As discussed above, in verbal morphology the verb receives affixes, clitics, constituents and particles. The affixes include prefixes and suffixes. The first are indicators of person, causes, reflexives and reciprocals. The suffixes indicate the mode, negation, and the causes of transitive. The clitics indicates person, negation, and the exhortative mode. The constituents and the particles signal distinctions in time, aspect and modality. In Kamayurá, a derivation of elements of a category from others of the same or distinct categories occurs through the addition of affixes to radicals and through a combination of roots and radicals. Both the affixation and the derivation can be used in a morphological level and a syntactic level. A prefix is used in the derivation of nominals while a suffix is used in other cases. In the verbal derivation, prefixes are used. Below we will only look at the diminutive and the augmentative forms of words.

In the endocentric derivation of nouns, the following suffixes are used, all of them tonics:

- -i “diminutive” with two allomorphs: -i in oral context and -ĩ in nasal context:

kap	“moth”	à kawi	“small moth”
tukan	“toucan”	à tukanĩ	“small toucan”

- -pĩ “diminutive”:

ɨʔa	“flower”	à ɨʔapĩ	“little flower”
ɨwɨrapat	“arch”	à ɨwɨrapapĩ	“little arch”

- -u “augmentative”. This is -u in the oral condition and -ũ in the nasal condition:

ipira	“fish”	à ipirau	“big fish”
wɨra	“bird”	à wɨrau	“big bird”

- -ete augmentative corresponds as well with “true genuine”:

-akaŋ	“head”	à -akaŋete	“big head”
-op	“leaf”	à -owete	“big leaf”

== Case and agreement ==
The Kamayurá language is composed of combined aspects of the nominative-accusative, active-stative and the establishment of a final verb with initial interrogative words. The Kamayurá language is also hierarchical, for example: The forms in series I with transitive verbs in the indicative and exhortative modes are used to codify A, the clitic pronouns to codify O and the prefixes of series IV to indicate A and O simultaneously.

Hierarchical references
	Participant		Indicated together with the verb by		
	A	O	Series I	Clitic	Series IV
1)	1, 2	3	A		
2)	3	1, 2		O	
3)	3	3	A		
4)	2	1		O	
5)	1excl	2sg	A		
6)	1sg	2sg			A/O
7)	1	2pl			A/O

The choice of the participant is being governed by the hierarchy of reference indicated in following which:

1. the first person has precedence over the second person
2. the second person has precedence over the third
3. A has precedence over O
  1. 1>2>3
  2. A>O

Depending on the hierarchy, given by both the A and O participants, the one higher hierarchical, will be expressed with the verb by the corresponding pronominal element. The following example explains lines 1 – 5 in the above hierarchical reference.

a-etsak	“I see him”	(1sg Vs. 3)
ja-etsak	“We (incl) see him”	(1ip Vs. 3)
oro-etsak	“We (excl) see him”	(1ep Vs. 3)
ere-etsak	“You see him”	(2sg Vs. 3)
pe-etsak	“You all see him”	(2pl Vs. 3)
je = r-etsak	“He sees me”	(3 Vs. 1sg)
jene = r-etsak	“He sees (1incl) us”	(3 Vs. 1ip)
ore = r-etsak	“He sees (1excl) us”	(3 Vs. 1ep)
ne = r-etsak	“He sees you”	(3 Vs. 2g)
pe = n-etsak	“He sees you all”	(3 Vs. 2pl)
o-etsak	“He sees him”	(3 Vs. 3)
je = r-etsak	“You see me”	(2sg Vs. 1sg)
ore = r-etsak	“You see (excl) us”	(2sg Vs. 1ep)
oro-etsak	“We (excl) see you”	(1ep Vs. 2sg)

== Quantification ==
=== Words for numbers and quantifiers which work as adverbials ===
Words for numerals and quantifiers like “everyone” and “few” are understood as being associated with a countable item, and can be nominal in function of the subject, or of the object, or even an event, however, they do not occur as nominal determinants, but they present adverbial properties:

mokõj kunuʔum -a o- ɨk
two boys -N 3- arrive
“two boys arrived”

moʔapɨt moɨtsowɨ -a r- iru -a a- mepɨ
three beads -N REL- packs -N 1SG- buy
"I bought three packs of beads"

mojepete rak a- jot {são paulo} katɨ
one AT 1SG- come N.PR. ALL
"I have come to São Paulo once”

=== Descriptive verb elements ===
There are two descriptive verb elements which occur as quantifiers “be very, very, many times” and -eta “be numerous”. The first only occurs with a third person indicator and, like other descriptive, can occur as an adverb:

iʔajaŋ i- karu -w
QUANT 3- eat -CIRC
"He ate a lot [many times]"

iʔajaŋ apɨkaw -a a- erut
QUANT bench -N 1SG- bring
"I will bring many benches"

=== Particles ===
Different from adverbs, particles do not occur isolated like a constituent and do not present adverbial characteristic properties. They are syntagmatically connected to the constituent which is or contains the element of which has scope. The particles can modify nominal, adverbial or the verb. This group of particles includes: tete “only”, meme “each”, atsã “little, small”, utsu “a lot”, aʔiaʔip “much”. Below are examples of the tete particle:

ene tete ere- ko
you PTC 2SG- {to be}
"it is only you?"

kaʔaruk -amuẽ tete a- ha ʔɨ -p
afternoon -SBJV PTC 1SG- go water -LOC
"Only in the afternoon I'm going to bathe"

=== Roots suffixed to the verb ===
In the verbal roots which are suffixed to the verb pointing out aspectual distinctions, the root -pap “end, finish, complete” expresses universal quantification associated to the subject arguments of the transitive verbs and the objects of transitive verbs. With the suffix -pap it is understood that the event/action covers the totality of the item, considered in its unit or the totality of the items. In the last case, in general, the indicator of number is present in construction:

ɨwɨra o-kaj -pap
stick 3-burn -COMPL
"the stick burned completely"

o- jomono -pap =awa
3- {to go (PL)} -COMPL =PL
"Everyone went"

=== Reduplication ===
Reduplication is a recourse used to express distinctions of an aspect and other types of quantification. It can reduplicate radical nominals, adverbials and verbals, generally marked the iterative, distributive and intensive:

jene rae-raem	"our screams [multiples]"
je=ʔa-jeʔat	"my day to day, my everyday"
mojepetepete	"one by one"
i-kana-kana	“very crooked, all crooked"
o-kɨtsi-kɨtsi	"he cut a lot, shredded"

== Sample text ==
The following sample is taken from Seki (2000), p. 438. It is a small excerpt of a folk take about the hero Arawitará, who is summoned by his deceased friend to help the souls of the dead in their eternal war against the birds. Here Arawitará has returned to the world of the living, and his describing his journey to the friend's old mother.

1. jererahame rake koʔɨt aʔŋa rupi rak orohome koʔɨt
2. jene peuan ikatu aʔia koʔɨpɨ
3. jawaʔipaip eheʔaŋ jajuw aʔe
4. te aʔiaʔiw aʔiwĩ jene retama koʔɨpɨ
5. jakatupe tete ne jene retama jaetsa koʔɨpɨ
6. nite ne jawaʔiawa koʔɨpɨ
7. kopiaip eheʔaŋ jaju kʷãjʔawan
8. petsakame te jene retama koʔɨwa
9. ipeiripɨrera witene
10. ipeiripɨrera wite aʔiaʔiwine jeneretama koʔɨpɨ
11. ojewunewunawa aʔiweru je wi kʷãj
12. okoj opiretepewewara ruri we
1. He [the deceased friend] took me [Arawitará]. We went this way.
2. Our straight path (Note: "The straight path" (peu-) is the path followed by the souls of the deceased to reach the other world.) is very beautiful
3. Here we live among ugly weeds
4. Ah, how beautiful is our [otherworldly] village!
5. I saw the [otherworldly] village very clean, (Note: Kamayurá villages consist of a ring of houses surrounding a flat central plaza of packed dirt, which is kept clean and swept frequently. The village of the departed souls is impeccable in this regard.)
6. There is not even a single weed there!
7. Here we live as in the path to the orchards, (Note: The Kamayurá orchards are located at some distance from the village, and the path to them usually goes through the tropical the jungle.) folks!
8. You should see our [otherworldly] village!
9. It is like one which has been swept
10. it is like one which has been swept a lot, our village
11. The poor [souls] spat on the ground for my being there (Note: The souls spat on the ground because the nauseating smell of the hero's living flesh made them sick.)
12. Here comes someone who is still in his original skin.

== Bibliography ==
=== Books ===
- Seki, Lucy (2000). Gramática do Kamaiurá, Língua Tupi-Guarani do Alto Xingu. Campinas, SP, Brasil: Editora da Unicamp & Imprensa Oficial do Estado S.A. IMESP. ISBN 85-268-0498-7.. This is a detailed, comprehensive, and readable description of the Kamayurá grammar, including a lexicon with ~1200 entries.

=== Papers ===
- Seki, Lucy (1990). "Kamaiurá (Tupi–Guarani) as an active–stative language". In Payne, Doris L. (ed.). Amazonian linguistics: Studies in Lowland South American languages. University of Texas Press.
- Saelzer, Meinke (1976). "Fonologia provisória da língua kamayurá". Série Lingüística.
