= Lucy Seki =

Brazilian linguist (1939–2017)

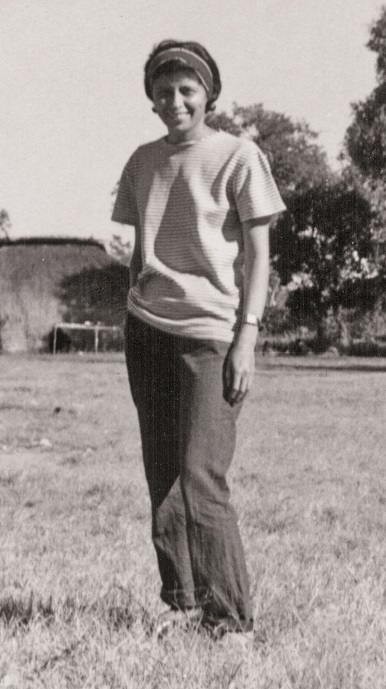
- Lucy Seki during her first visit to the Xingu (1968)
- Born: March 27, 1939; Belo Horizonte
- Died: June 23, 2017 (aged 78); Campinas
- Citizenship: Brazilian
- Occupation: Linguist
- Spouse: Hiroshi Seki

Academic background
- Education: Patrice Lumumba University

Academic work
- Discipline: Linguistics
- Institutions: University of Brasília
- Main interests: Indigenous languages of Brazil
- Notable works: Gramática do Kamaiurá, Língua Tupi-Guarani do Alto Xingu

Lucy Seki (27 March 1939 – 23 June 2017) was a Brazilian linguist specializing in indigenous languages of the Americas. She authored a grammar of the Kamayurá language.

== Biography ==
Lucy Seki had a Master's and Ph.D. in linguistics from the Patrice Lumumba University in Moscow. She was also awarded a Bachelor in history by the Federal University of Minas Gerais, and did post-doctorate studies at the University of Texas at Austin. She was a full professor at the State University of Campinas (UNICAMP), Brazil. In 2010, she was elected an honorary member of the Linguistic Society of America for her outstanding contribution to the field.

== Publications ==
=== Books ===
- Gramática do Kamaiurá, Língua Tupi-Guarani do Alto Xingu. 482 pages + 17 color photo album Editora UNICAMP and São Paulo State Official Press (2000, in Portuguese). ISBN 85-268-0498-7.

=== Papers ===
- Kamaiurá (Tupi-Guarani) as an active-stative language. In D. L. Payne (ed.), Amazonian linguistics: Studies in Lowland South American languages, University of Texas Press (1990).
