= National Statistics Office of Vietnam =

Vietnamese statistics and census agency

National Statistics Office
- Cục Thống kê

Agency overview
- Formed: 6 May 1946; 80 years ago
- Preceding agency: General Statistics Office
- Jurisdiction: Government of Vietnam
- Headquarters: 54 Nguyen Chi Thanh street, Dong Da district, Ha Noi
- Employees: 5300
- Agency executive: Nguyen Thi Huong, Director General
- Parent agency: Ministry of Finance (Vietnam)
- Website: www.nso.gov.vn

The National Statistics Office (NSO; Vietnamese: Cục Thống kê, lit. 'Department of Statistics'), formerly the General Statistics Office (GSO; Vietnamese: Tổng cục Thống kê, lit. 'General Department of Statistics'), is an agency under the Ministry of Finance, performing the function of the state management for statistics; conducting statistical activities and providing social and economic information to organizations and individuals domestically and internationally in accordance with the law.

== Organizational structure and finance ==
The National Statistics Office consisting of 13 administrative units and 4 public service delivery units, overseeing 63 Statistics Offices in provinces and municipalities.

=== Departments ===
The National Statistics Office comprises 13 administrative departments: the System of National Accounts Department; the Statistical Methodology Standard and IT Department; the Integrated Statistics Department; the Industrial Statistics Department; the Agricultural, Forestry & Fishery Statistics Department; the Trade and Services Statistics Department; the Population & Labor Statistics Department; the Social and Environmental Statistics Department; the Foreign Statistics and International Cooperation Department; the Human Resources Department; the Financial Planning Department; the Statistics Legislation and Inspection Department; and the Administration Office. Additional departments include the Price Statistics Department and the Construction and Capital Investment Statistics Department.

=== Public delivery service agencies ===
The office oversees four public service delivery units, which include the Institute of Statistical Science; Statistical Informatics Centers No. 1, No. 2, and No. 3; the Statistical Documentation and Service Center; the College of Statistics in Bac Ninh province; the College of Statistics No. 2 in Dong Nai province; the Statistical Forms and Questionnaire Distribution Company; the Ho Chi Minh City Statistical Printing Enterprise; the Statistical Publishing House; and the Figures and Events Journal.
