= Chrau language =

Austroasiatic language spoken in Vietnam

Chrau
- Native to: Vietnam
- Region: Đồng Nai, Tây Ninh, and Bình Dương provinces
- Ethnicity: 26,900 Chrau people (2009 census)
- Native speakers: (7,000 cited 1995 census)
- Language family: Austroasiatic: Bahnaric; South Bahnaric; Stieng–Chrau; Chrau
- Writing system: Latin

Language codes
- ISO 639-3: crw
- Glottolog: chra1242
- ELP: Chrau

Chrau (Vietnamese: Charuo, Chauro, also known as Jro, Ro, Tamun, Cho Ro, Choro, Chíoro, Doro /ˈtʃraʊ/) is a Bahnaric language spoken by some of the 22,000 ethnic Cho Ro people in southern Vietnam. Unlike most languages of Southeast Asia, Chrau has no lexical tone, though it does have significant sentence intonation.

There are fewer than 20,000 native speakers of Chrau. Most people who speak Chrau are from the Southern parts of Vietnam such as Bien Hoa and Binh Tuy.

The language of Chrau has much Chinese influence, explaining its similarity to many other languages. In the later years after they began to sell crops to others in the area, the influence of Vietnamese would begin to appear in their language. Similarly to the Chinese and Vietnamese language, there are also certain tones in the Chrau language that are emphasized when speaking.

== Classification ==
The Chrau language is part of the South Bahnaric subgroup along with Kơho, Stiêng and the Mnon dialects. Many see Kơho and Chrau as an independent subgroup but there is not much on that, however the distinction between the two is seen to be obvious. Since it is of Bahnaric origin, there are many cognates with other divisions in this group such as Jarai and Radê. There is also seen to be many influences from other Southeast Asian countries other than Vietnam like Laos and Cambodia as well as Malaysia.

== History ==
Many suspect the Chrau people were among the first inhabitants of now South Vietnam, however there has been some suspicion that some of the people may have been aboriginals. Before the Vietnamese had inhabited the country, the country was divided between the Malayo-Polynesian and Mon-Khmer speakers. With the Malayo-Polynesian people settling along the inland and high plateaus of Vietnam and the Mon-Khmer people living either North or South of the plateau. Although there is a gap in history between the two areas, many suspect that there could have been a Mon-Khmer invasion to the Malayo-Polynesian. Explaining why the Mon-Khmer language was more prevalent in Southern Vietnam. This has also sparked different stories by different groups of how the Chrau came about be it form the Cambodians of Chamic people.

There are changes happening due to the war forced resettlement of the Chrau, the Jro clan was one of the largest clans of the Chrau people which is why the language is sometimes referred to as Jro. As the Vietnamese began to settle in the area, the Chrau language slowly transformed into Vietnamese, which is why Chrau became an endangered language.

The Chrau language has become something that is exclusively spoken to with other people who know the language. In different situations, Vietnamese is what is typically being used in the markets and not much of the newer generation will not have known what Chrau is.

== Geographic distribution ==
Chrau is currently homogeneous because of the surround clans. Being spoken in the South Vietnam in an area 50 miles from the east of Saigon. Chrau people are known to stretch from the Langa River to the east of Tánhlinh, dividing the east of Chrau and west of Rơgali (another language being spoken). Most of the Chrau language is spoken along the seacoast from Hàmtân to Vũngtàu and Longthành but not farther than the Đồngnai River. Though there are no official cities that have Chrau as an official language, many areas around the Phướctuy and Biênhòa cities there are many who still speak the language there. Though Vietnamese is the major language in all areas.

Many of the people who do speak Chrau tend to lived in areas between the flat lands near the Mekong delta but also near mountainous areas of Vietnam. However, there seems to have been a shift if recent years to the highway areas of Vietnam because of the change in weather which makes traveling difficult for the Chrau people as well as financial stability.

== Dialects ==
=== Jro ===
There is the Jro dialect which is spoken by the majority of the people who do know Chrau because they were the largest clan that existed at the time. It is spoken around the area of

Consonants
ph	th	chh	kh	p	t	ch	l,r
c	k	q	v	d	j	g	y
b	đ	m	n	nh	ng	w	s

The dialect separates "n" from "h" as well as saying "ư" is essentially a neutralization of "ĭ" and "ŭ" in certain environments. While "ĕ/ă" and "â/ŏ" neutralize in other environments. Allowing the open syllables to take only long vowels.

=== Prâng ===
This dialect is spoken in locations such as the Túctrung area, but many consider this dialect to be childish and a general mutual intelligibility in context. Although this is not the most popular dialect, there are a few records that are in this dialect.

Meaning	Main dialect	Prâng
forest	nggô	vri
walk	saq	hăn
I	ănh	ĭnh
play	lêng	khlân
small	ken	vây

Even though there does not seem to be much correlation, it is due to the environment in which the Chrau were in, where they found themselves attempting to mix the two influences of Chinese as well as Vietnamese since the Prâng dialect was more to the west side of Vietnam where it bordered along Laos and Cambodia.

== Phonology ==
In Chrau there is only one main syllable that is stressed and may sometimes contain unstressed syllables that are considered presyllables. Usually the nouns, verbs, adjectives and such are either monosyllabic or disyllabic. While other parts such as connectives and verbal auxiliaries take are monosyllabic.

Presyllables in Chrau consist of a single initial consonant followed by a single neutral vowel while the main syllable has up to three consonants following a complex vowel in the end.

This results in a nasally sounding consonant followed by voiced stops or voiceless stops. A voiced stop is seen as a stop in the consonant which has more to do with the throat and vibrations in the vocal cords rather than an actual stop in speech.

Chrau is seen to be spoken in pitches much higher due to the nasal sounds as well as at a quicker pace because of the voiceless stops as well as the stressed and unstressed syllables.

== Grammar ==
=== Morphology ===
Chrau has a major influence of monosyllables from the trend in eastern and southeastern Asia so there is little left that are some of the original words of Chrau. This can also be seen through the Mon-Khmer language.

Within the Chrau language there has been an evolution of reduplication. This can be seen with words that have similar spelling that describes an action.

Word	Meaning
mlŭq mlăq	dirty
mbăq mban	unskillfully
rawênh rawai	dizzy

=== Syntax ===
Many find Chrau to be moving to a language that is a tonal language, which is based on the emphasis given to each letter in the word. Similarly to Vietnamese and Chinese. There also seems to be a tendency to where Chrau would weaken certain verbs in order to let them have more than one use like an adverb or a preposition. When it comes to pronouns and other nouns there is only a slight difference syntactically.

== Vocabulary ==
English	Vietnamese	Chrau
see	xem	sên
die	chết	chưt
house	nhà	nhi
squeeze	bóp	bop
green	xanh	sănh

Since the Chrau is in Southern Vietnam, there has been influences from all ends such as the markets and roads that are being built. Although many words of the Chrau had originated as their own word, as the Vietnamese and Chinese influence began to seep in, their words became morph into something that was a combination of both languages. However, only the Chrau seemed to have understood the language that has formed. It is also noted that not all their words have been influenced by the Vietnamese, rather just a few.

== Writing system ==
Sentence	Literal Translation	Proper Translation
Anh văt nĕh hao	I lifted up it	I lifted it up
Vơn an nĕh	We gave to him	We gave it to him
Vơn păh nĕh iưm glao măq lŭng	We chop for him very big bamboo	We chopped large bamboo for him

The writing system tends to be more formal since it is neither a traditional culture or intimate conversation. There is a colloquial style that is used in ordinary conversation which is marked by short sentences and frequent ellipsis.

== Examples ==
=== Numbering System ===
Number	Pronunciation	Number	Pronunciation	Number	Pronunciation	Number	Pronunciation
1	muoːi / du	11	maːt muoːi	21	val ɟaːt muoːi	40	puoːn ɟaːt
2	val	12	maːt val	22	val ɟaːt val	50	prăm ɟaːt
3	pe	13	maːt pe	23	val ɟaːt pe	60	prau ɟaːt
4	puoːn	14	maːt puoːn	24	val ɟaːt puoːn	70	pŏh ɟaːt
5	prăm	15	maːt prăm	25	val ɟaːt prăm	80	pʰam ɟaːt
6	prau	16	maːt prau	26	val ɟaːt prau	90	suˀn ɟaːt
7	pŏh / paːh	17	maːt pŏh	27	val ɟaːt pŏh	100	du rajĕŋ
8	pʰam	18	maːt pʰam	28	val ɟaːt pʰam	200	val rajĕŋ
9	suˀn	19	maːt suˀn	29	val ɟaːt suˀn	1000	du ravu < Chamic
10	maːt	20	val ɟaːt	30	pe ɟaːt	2000	val ravu

The numbering system is one example of the difference in the Chrau language to other languages, that even though there is a bit of Chamic and Mon-Khmer influence as well as others. It still has its own unique numbering system, that is only for it.

== See also ==
- Chrau Hma language
