= Cho Ro people =

Chơ Ro
Total population
- Vietnam 29,520 (2019)

Regions with significant populations
- Vietnam : Đồng Nai, Ho Chi Minh City

Languages
- Vietnamese • Chrau

Religion
- Animism • Theravada Buddhism

The Chơ Ro (or Chau Ro, Do Ro; Vietnamese: người Chơ Ro) are a Mon–Khmer people in Vietnam. Most Chơ Ro live in Đồng Nai, Ho Chi Minh City. The population was 29,520 in 2019.

Their New Year Festival (Cho Ro language: Yang Pa) has the purpose of worshipping their Rice God.
