= Vengo people =

Babungo (Vengo)
Total population
- 14,000

Regions with significant populations
- Cameroon

Languages
- Babungo (Vengo), Cameroonian Pidgin English, English, French

Religion
- Animism, Christianity

Related ethnic groups
- Bamessing, Bambalang

The Vengo, or Babungos, are an ethnic group of about 14,000 people who are resident in the anglophone Northwest Province of Cameroon. They live predominantly in the region of a village which is also called Vengo or "Babungo". This village is located in the Cameroonian Grassfields at the so-called "Ringroad", approximately 50 km West of the province's capital Bamenda. The language of the people is also called Vengo or "Babungo". For the tribe, village and language the spelling "Bamungo" is also often found.

In their own language, the Vengo call their village vengo [vəŋóo] and their language ghang vengo [ɣáŋ vəŋóo]; this is why the name of the tribe, village and language is officially also listed under the names "Vengo" or "Vengoo". Other alternative terms are: Vengi, Pengo, Ngo, Nguu, Ngwa, Nge.

Famous Vengo People According to Chique Magazine "Golden Globe nominated actor, Producer, Director and six-time winner of the NAACP Awards Blair Underwood's ancestors are Vengo. In 2011, in an episode of the NBC show 'Who do you think you are?' Blair Underwood traced his ancestry to the Vengo people of the Cameroon in Central Africa. He journeyed with his father to his ancestral homeland in Cameroon and reconnected with his family. In an emotionally laden voice, Blair said at the end of the show that, 'What I will share with my children is that we come from a long line of people from these valleys, to actually be able to travel all these long miles and to meet my cousins face to face, it feels like the family has come full circle to reunite a family that was broken. Voids were filled that I didn’t even realize that I had. For me, we are African not because we were born African but because Africa was born in us. Who I thought I was when we started this journey is different from who I know I am today. It has been incredible.'"

== Bibliography ==
- Willi Schaub: Babungo. Croom Helm Descriptive Grammars. Croom Helm Ltd., Beckenham, Kent, UK 1985, ISBN 0-7099-3352-5.
- Jean-Paul Notue: Treasures of the Kings Sculptor: Babungo: Memory, Arts and Techniques. 5 Continents Edition, 2005, ISBN 88-7439-203-6.
- Johannes Ittmann: Volkskundliche und religiöse Begriffe im nördlichen Waldland von Kamerun. Afrika und Übersee: Folge der Beihefte zur Zeitschrift der Eingeborenen-Sprachen: Beiheft 26. Verlag von Dietrich Reimer, Berlin, Germany 1953 (no ISBN).
- Brigitte Staub: Trommeln, Palmwein, Hexen. Erlebnisse im Grasland von Kamerun. Sternberg Verlag, Metzingen/Württemberg, Germany 2000, ISBN 3-7722-0351-5.
- Philippe Laburthe-Tolra: Initiations et sociétés secrètes au Cameroun. Essai sur la religion beti. Karthala, Paris, France 1985, ISBN 2-86537-142-5.
- Miriam Goheen: Men Own the Fields, Women own the Crops. Gender and Power in the Cameroon Grassfields. The University of Wisconsin Press, Madison, Wisconsin, USA 1996, ISBN 0-299-14670-7.
- Hans-Georg Wolf: English in Cameroon. Contributions to the Sociology of Language, Volume 85. Walter de Gruyter, Berlin, Germany 2001, ISBN 3-11-017053-1.
- Carole de Féral: Pidgin-English du Cameroun. Description linguistique et sociolinguistique. Peeters/Selaf, Paris, France 1989, ISBN 2-87723-023-6.
- Hans-Joachim Koloß: Kamerun: Könige - Masken - Feste. Ethnologische Forschungen im Grasland der Nordwest-Provinz von Kamerun. Institut für Auslandsbeziehungen Stuttgart, Linden-Museum Stuttgart, Germany 1977 (no ISBN).
- Angeline Nguedjeu Nkwenkam: Nonformale Bildung und Berufsbildung zum Empowerment von Frauen für den informellen Sektor: Eine Studie aus dem Kameruner Grasland. Inauguraldissertation zur Erlangung des Grades einer Doktorin der Philosophie (Ph.D. Thesis). University of Heidelberg, Germany, 2003 (no ISBN).
