= Rơ Măm people =

Ro Mam
Total population
- 639 (2019)

Regions with significant populations
- Vietnam

Languages
- Romam

Religion
- Traditional Religion

The Rmam people are a small ethnic group in Vietnam (639 in 2019). They speak a language in the Central Bahnaric branch of the Mon–Khmer family. They mostly reside in Le Village, Mo Rai Commune, Kon Tum. Hunting, gathering, agriculture, and weaving are the main sources of wealth in current Ro Mam society.

== Gallery ==
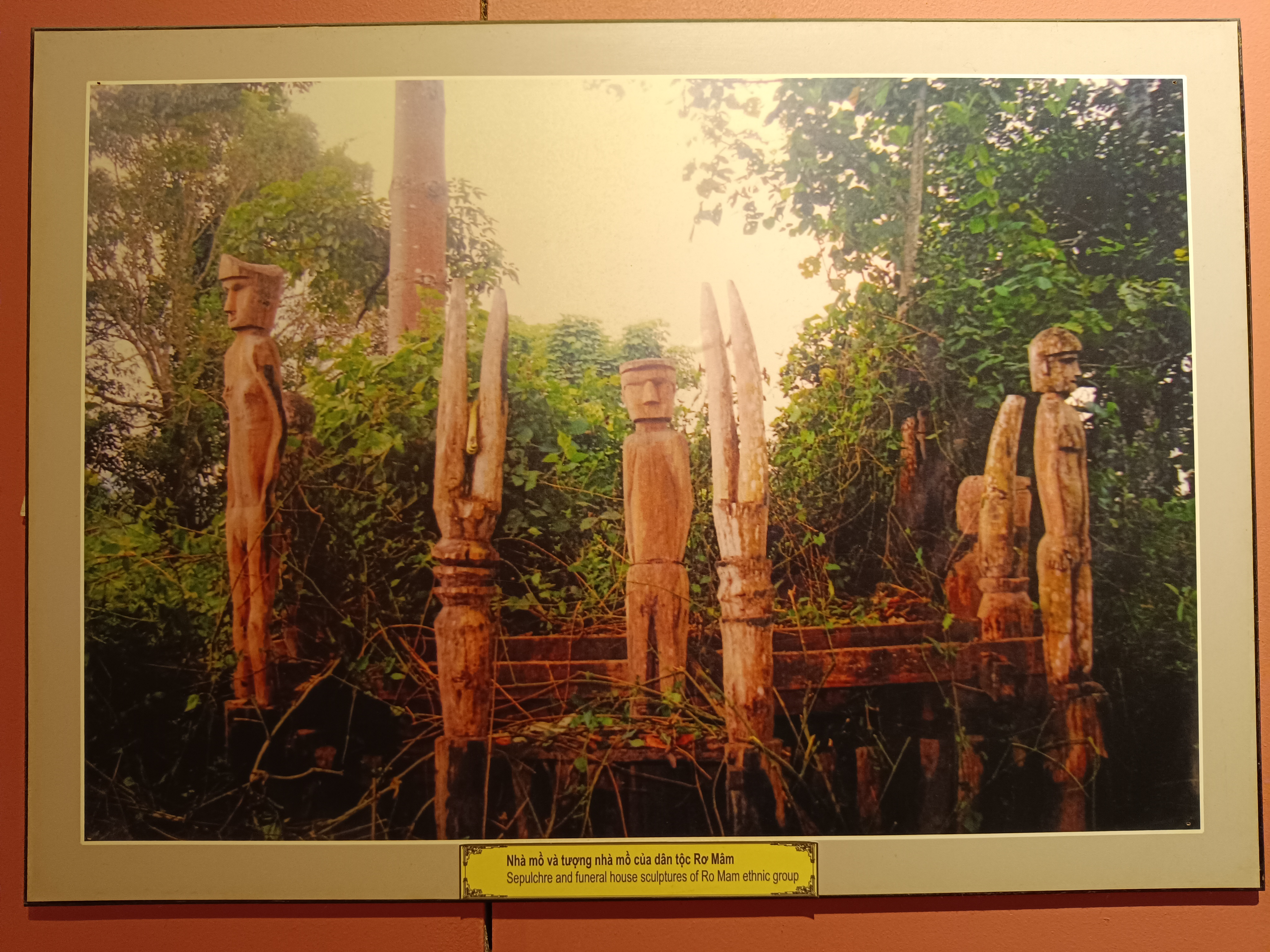
Sepulchre and funeral house sculptures

== See also ==
- List of ethnic groups in Vietnam
