= Vengo language =

Grassfields language spoken in Cameroon

Vengo
- Babungo
- gháŋ vəŋóo
- Native to: Cameroon
- Region: North West Province
- Native speakers: 27,000 (2008)
- Language family: Niger–Congo?: Atlantic–Congo; Benue–Congo; Southern Bantoid; Grassfields; Ring; South; Vengo

Language codes
- ISO 639-3: bav
- Glottolog: veng1238

Vengo (Vəŋo), or Babungo, is a Grassfields language and the language of the Vengo people from the village of Babungo in the Cameroonian Grassfields. The spelling Bamungo is also often found.

In their own language, the Vengo people call their village vengo (vəŋóo), and their language ghang vengo (gháŋ vəŋóo), which means "language of the Vengo"; it is thus officially listed under the name Vengo or Vengoo. Other names for the language are Vengi, Pengo, Ngo, Nguu, Ngwa, Nge.

Vengo is spoken by about 14,000 people. Because the Babungo people all live closely together and concentrate only in and around Vengo village, there are only small dialectical variations in their speech.

The Vengo language uses different tone pitches, which form a distinctive feature for the meaning of the words. In the Vengo tone system, there are eight distinctive pitch types or pitch sequences on vowels: high, mid, low, high-mid, high-low, low-falling, low-high, low-high-mid.

The use of the language (and traditional Babungo customs) is decreasing among the Babungo people due to not insignificant socio-cultural problems in that region. In most cases, those people acquire English as mother tongue, if they stay predominantly in the anglophone Northwest of Cameroon, otherwise French if they orient themselves towards the francophone parts of Cameroon. Most of the people in Western Cameroon speak Cameroonian Pidgin English anyway.

== Phonology ==
=== Consonants ===
Consonants
		Labial	Alveolar	Post-alveolar	Velar	Glottal
Plosive	voiceless	(p) (Note: in loanwords)	t		k	ʔ
Plosive	voiced	b	d		g	
Fricative/ Affricate	voiceless	f	s	ʃ		
Fricative/ Affricate	voiced	v	z	d͡ʒ	ɣ	
Nasal		m	n	ɲ	ŋ	
Rhotic			(r)			
Approximant		w	l	j		

Voiceless plosives /t/ and /k/ are lightly aspirated ([tʰ] and [kʰ]). Some speakers alternate [ʃ] and [t͡ʃ] for /ʃ/, but /d͡ʒ/ is always voiced.

/p/ and /r/ only occur in loanwords. Schaub does not describe /r/ but consistently uses [r]. /p/ tends to become aspirated [pʰ] in Christian names and become [b] elsewhere. On the other hand, /r/ tends to become [l], even in Christian names.

==== Prenasalization ====
Most of the stops and fricatives/affricates can be prenasalized. Nasals are homorganic to the following consonant. As a result, /m/ becomes [ɱ] before /f/ and /v/. The following examples show which consonants can be prenasalized and the phonemic status of prenasalization. Note that /w j v ɣ/ become /gw d͡ʒ b g/ when prenasalized.

Plain	Gloss	Prenasalized	Gloss
[bɪ́]	'goat'	[mbɪ́]	'world'
[dɪ̌ˑ]	'to celebrate'	[ndɪ̌ˑ]	'to take'
[gɨ̞̏]	'voice'	[ŋgɨ̞̏]	'type of calabash'
[fɪ́]	'to take'	[ɱfɪ́]	'sorcerer'
[séː]	'to split'	[nséː]	'elephant'
[ʃə́]	'to cover'	[nʃə́]	'mother of newborn'
[vɨ̌ˑʔ]	'to fan'	[ɱvɨ̏ʔ]	'fan (n)'
[zwɪ́]	'to kill'	[nzwɪ́]	'killer'
[d͡ʒɨ̀ː]	'road'	[nd͡ʒɨ̀ː]	'room, side'
[wɪ̂]	'that (class 1 & 3)'	[ŋgwîː]	'that-emphatic'
[jɪ̂]	'that (class 4, 5, & 9)'	[nd͡ʒîː]	'that-emphatic'
[vɪ̂]	'those (class 2 & 8)'	[mbîː]	'those-emphatic'
[ɣɪ̂]	'those (class 6)'	[ŋgîː]	'those-emphatic'

==== Labialization ====
/ v w ɣ ʔ/ cannot be labialized. Consonants can be both prenasalized and labialized.

=== Vowels ===
Vengo has nine phonemic vowels and five diphthongs or vowel-glide sequences.

==== Monophthongs ====
Monophthongs
	Front	Central	Back
Close	i (Note: /i/ becomes [ɪ] before [ŋ] and in short open syllables.)	ɨ (Note: /ɨ/ becomes [ɨ̞] before [ŋ] and in short open syllables.)	u (Note: /u/ becomes [ʊ] before [ŋ] and in short open syllables.)
Mid	e	ə (Note: ə becomes [ɨ̞] before [ʔ] and with lengthened vowels.)	o
Open	ɛ	a (Note: /a/ becomes [a] is raised to [a̝] in /ia/ and backed to [ɒ] in au.)	ɔ (Note: /ɔ/ becomes [ɔ̝ː] when lengthened.)

==== Diphthongs ====
Vengo's diphthongs are /ɨə/, /ei/, /ia/, ai, and /au/.

=== Phonotactics ===
Any consonant may occur word-initially or syllable-initially, but only /ʔ/ and /ŋ/ can occur finally.

== Bibliography ==
- Schaub, Willi (1985). Babungo. Croom Helm Descriptive Grammars. London: Croom Helm. ISBN 0-7099-3352-5.
