= U.S. Bilateral Relations Fact Sheets =

The U.S. Bilateral Relations Fact Sheets, also known as the Background Notes, are a series of works by the United States Department of State. These publications include facts about the land, people, history, government, political conditions, economy, and foreign relations of independent states, some dependencies, and areas of special sovereignty. The series is available online through the State Department's website.
