= Long Wall of Quảng Ngãi =

Historical structure in Vietnam

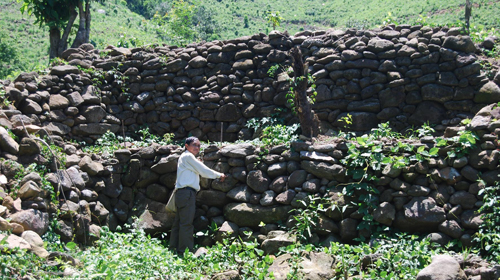
The Long Wall of Quang Ngai in March 2011

The Long Wall of Quang Ngai (Vietnamese: Trường lũy Quảng Ngãi), Truong luy, or the Great Wall of Vietnam is a 127.4-kilometre (79.2 mi) rampart extending from Vietnam's Quảng Ngãi Province in the north to Binh Dinh Province in the south. The defensive wall was built by the Nguyễn dynasty as a demarcation line against the Đá Vách (H're people). It is the longest monument in Southeast Asia.

== History and purpose ==
According to Đại Nam thực lục (English: The Veritable Records of the Great South) and other archives from the reign of Emperor Đồng Khánh, the wall was constructed in 1819 by Lê Văn Duyệt, a high-ranking mandarin, under Emperor Gia Long early in the Nguyễn dynasty. The wall is considered the "greatest engineering feat" of the Nguyễn dynasty. Nguyen Tien Dong contended that the wall was constructed over 500 years ago and was adopted for military purposes during the 19th century. Nguyen Dang Vu, director of the Department of Culture, Sports and Tourism of Quảng Ngãi, said that parts of the wall in mountainous regions existed hundreds of years ago. It was possibly constructed by General Bui Ta Han (1496–1568) when he became the leader of Quảng Nam. Archaeologists have excavated ceramic relics that verify the 16th-century origin.

In 2005, Andrew Hardy, associate professor and head of the Hanoi branch of the École française d'Extrême-Orient (French School of the Far East), which has been relocated to Paris since 1975, came upon a textual reference to a "Long Wall of Quang Ngai" in the "Descriptive Geography of the Emperor Dong Khanh," an 1885 Nguyễn dynasty court document. An excavation crew was assembled; led by Hardy and archaeologist Nguyen Tien Dong of the Institute of Archaeology at the Vietnam Academy of Social Sciences, the team discovered the wall after five years of searching. In 2009, they had uncovered the first portion of the wall in Nghĩa Hành District. The wall has since been a destination of some independent explorers.

Experts posit that the construction of the wall was the result of the work of Nguyễn dynasty soldiers and collaboration between the Viet and the H're minority, who seldom had peaceful relations. Residents of either side of the wall relate that the wall was erected by their forebears to prevent invasions by the opposing side. Not only did it define the territorial borders of the respective peoples, it also afforded security and furthered trade. Similar rock arrangement methods have been found on Lý Sơn Island.

One-hundred fifteen forts are located where rivers intersect the wall, with posts for 15 to 20 guards each. In these secured settings, the Viet and the H're conducted trade, the H're trading rice, cinnamon, and forest products for salt from the Viet.

During the Vietnam War, armaments and food were conveyed from north to south Vietnam via portions of the wall in Đức Phổ and Hoài Ân districts, as extensions of the Ho Chi Minh trail.

== Description ==
Running parallel to the Truong Son mountain range, the wall extends through ten districts—Trà Bồng, Sơn Tịnh, Sơn Hà, Tư Nghĩa, Minh Long, Nghĩa Hành, Ba Tơ, Đức Phổ, Hoài Ân, and An Lão.

Alternating chunks of soil and rock were used to build the wall, reaching 4 metres (13 ft) in height at its maximum and 2.5 metres (8.2 ft) in width. In more rugged terrain, the wall was built primarily of rocks to prevent landslides and provide stability in inclement weather. The wall is similar to Hadrian's Wall in that it is parallel to an antiquated trade route. Researchers have unearthed markets, temples, and the aforementioned forts along the road, all built long before the wall.

Some natives dub it the "Great Wall of Vietnam". The wall runs along the "Đường cái quan thượng" (English: Upper main Mandarin's road) as it safeguards the National Route connecting the north and south Vietnam regions.

== Research ==
Christopher Young of English Heritage said, "The Long Wall presents an enormous opportunity for research, careful conservation and sustainable use". At a 27 March conference at the site of the wall, EU ambassadors deemed the wall a "unique architectural monument not only of Vietnam but also of the world". Hardy asserted that the wall "is the evidence of goods transaction between the people in the lowland and upperland". French Ambassador to Vietnam Jean-François Girault said, "In the world, there are walls to separate communities but the Truong Luy Wall in Quang Ngai gives us a new look about the mutual-assistance of difference communities".

== Tourism and preservation ==
On 9 March 2011, the Vietnam government formally established the wall as a National Heritage site, planning to request the UNESCO World Cultural Heritage designation and to make the wall a global tourist site. In view of Quảng Ngãi's history, developing the wall for tourism would be difficult, CNN's Adam Bray noted. Tourism in Quảng Ngãi has been considerably limited by the government. Establishing the wall as a tourist destination would call for government encouragement of "adventure trekking and cycling through previously isolated highland communities on an unprecedented scale", introducing historical ecotourism. The government plans to build a "protected corridor stretching 500m on either side of the wall", and the People's Committee of Quảng Ngãi has devoted VND15 billion to rejuvenating and maintaining the wall. Nguyen Giang Hai of the Vietnam Institute of Archaeology asserted that since the preservation of the relic is contingent on indigenous sentiment, "there is a need to sow the seed of consciousness for protecting the relic in the community living alongside the structure." Young articulated that in the case of tourism, "income-generation opportunities" should be available for locals, since "a world heritage is not something to admire but [something] for the benefit of the people".

Between 27 April and 8 May, English and French advisers will examine the wall and discuss with Quảng Ngãi officials how to publicise the wall in light of socioeconomic expansion.

== See also ==
- Cheonri Jangseong
