= Cor people =

Ethnic group of Vietnam

Cor
Total population
- 40,442 (2019)

Regions with significant populations
- Vietnam : Quảng Ngãi, Quảng Nam

Languages
- Vietnamese, Cua

Religion
- Animist

The Cor (or Co, Col, Cùa; Vietnamese: Người Co) are an ethnic group of Vietnam. Most Cor live in the provinces Quảng Ngãi and Quảng Nam of the South Central Coast region of Vietnam, and numbered 40,442 in 2019.

In 1996, they made up a slight majority of the population in Trà Bồng District (which then also included Tây Trà District), numbering around 18,000 there.

The Cor speak Cua, a language in the Mon–Khmer family.

== Culture ==
The Cor people used to maintain a chieftain system. The village chief (Karah Pley) is the head of the community (Pley). The village chief is chosen on the basis of knowledge, experience and the trust of villagers. Each village organise a body of militias called Lok kok or Lok kal (lit. "Brave men") for self-defense.

The Cor believe that all things have souls, including good spirits (garu) and bad spirits. They worship the souls of rice grains, spirit of cinnamon barks and of livestock. In former days, the Cor lived in long houses built on stilts called X'lup Recently, the Co has built shorter houses and at ground level. In the past, no Cor lineage had an individual name; they all took the family name of Dinh. Now, nearly all men have taken the family name of Ho, after President Ho Chi Minh.

Cor music features a variety of songs, dances, beat drums, and gongs. Folk songs such as the Xru, Klu and Agioi are very popular. The Cor New Year is called Xa a'ni and is celebrated by animal offerings, sword dancing, gong dancing and wrestling competition. Cor people lives mainly from slash-and-burn agriculture. They grow rice, maize, cassava, cinnamon, and other plants.

Ritual pole of the Cor

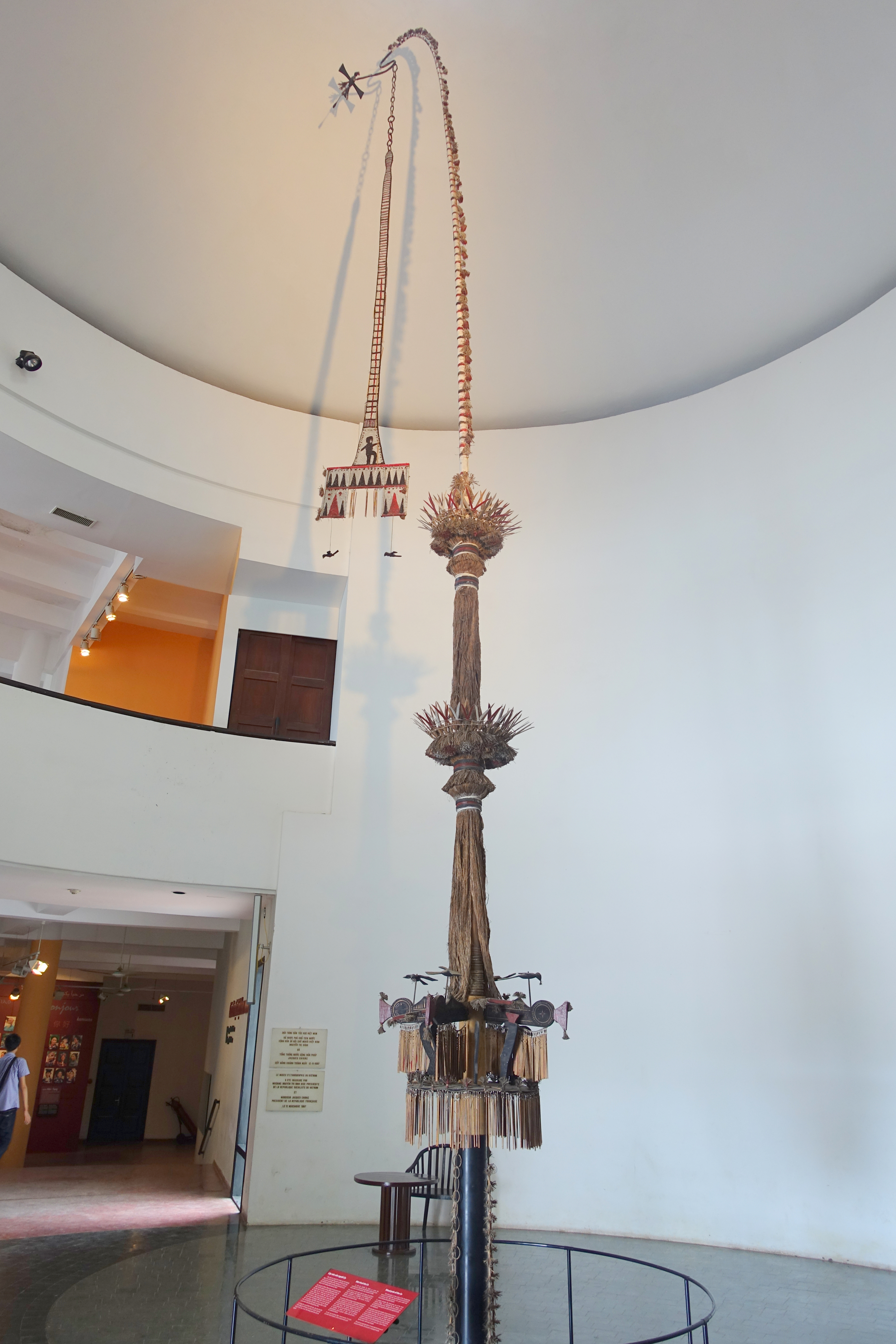
upper part

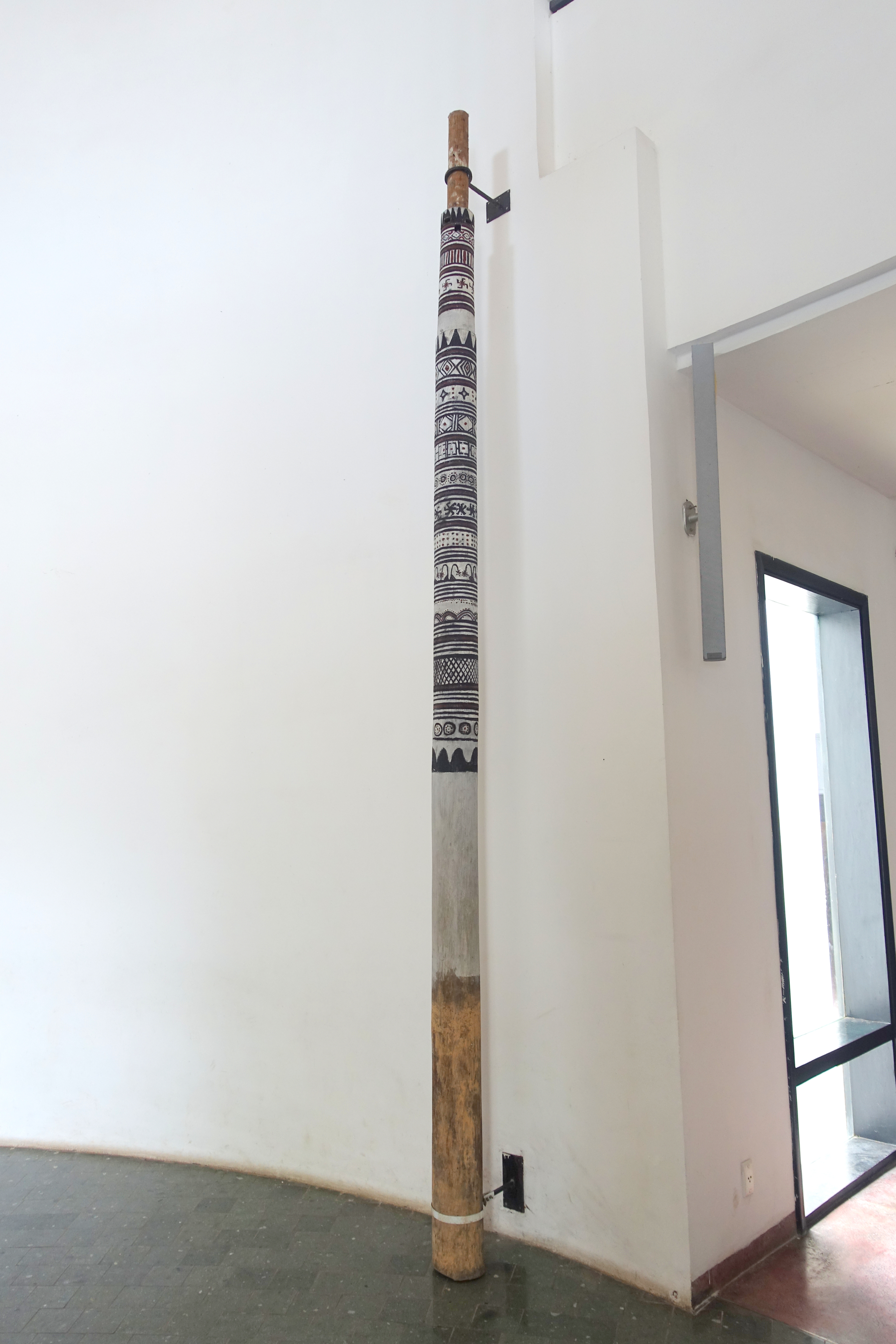
Lower part
