= Minh Long =

- Commune
- Thác Trắng Ecotourism Area

- Location in Vietnam
- Coordinates: 14.932497297120127°N 108.70350028223405°E
- Country: Vietnam
- Region: South Central Coast and Central Highlands
- Province: Quảng Ngãi
- Established: 16 June 2025

Area
  - Total: 124.74 km^{2} (48.16 sq mi)

Population (31 December 2024)
  - Total: 10,085
  - Density: 80/km^{2} (210/sq mi)

Minh Long is a commune in Quảng Ngãi province, Vietnam.

On 16 June 2025, the Standing Committee of the National Assembly of Vietnam issued Resolution No. 1677/NQ-UBTVQH15 on the arrangement of commune-level administrative units in Quảng Ngãi province in 2025. Under the resolution, the entire area and population of Long Hiệp, Thanh An, and Long Môn communes, formerly part of Minh Long district, were merged to form a new commune named Minh Long.
