= Sơn Hà =

- Commune
- Location in Vietnam
- Coordinates: 15.049780892737425°N 108.46725863976951°E
- Country: Vietnam
- Region: South Central Coast and Central Highlands
- Province: Quảng Ngãi
- Established: 16 June 2025

Area
  - Total: 163.44 km^{2} (63.10 sq mi)

Population (31 December 2024)
  - Total: 20,326
  - Density: 124/km^{2} (320/sq mi)

Sơn Hà is a commune in Quảng Ngãi province, Vietnam.

On 16 June 2025, the Standing Committee of the National Assembly of Vietnam issued Resolution No. 1677/NQ-UBTVQH15 on the arrangement of commune-level administrative units in Quảng Ngãi province in 2025. Under the resolution, the entire area and population of Di Lăng township, Sơn Bao, and Sơn Thượng communes, formerly part of Sơn Hà district, were merged to form a new commune named Sơn Hà.
