= Trà Bồng =

- Commune
- Location in Vietnam
- Coordinates: 15.255662416608082°N 108.51699520844875°E
- Country: Vietnam
- Region: South Central Coast and Central Highlands
- Province: Quảng Ngãi
- Established: 16 June 2025

Area
  - Total: 139.43 km^{2} (53.83 sq mi)

Population (31 December 2024)
  - Total: 18,926
  - Density: 135/km^{2} (350/sq mi)

Trà Bồng is a commune in Quảng Ngãi province, Vietnam.

On 12 June 2025, the National Assembly of Vietnam issued Resolution No. 202/2025/QH15 on the reorganization of provincial-level administrative units. Under the resolution, the entire area and population of Quảng Ngãi and Kon Tum province were merged to form a new province named Quảng Ngãi.

On 16 June 2025, the Standing Committee of the National Assembly of Vietnam issued Resolution No. 1677/NQ-UBTVQH15 on the arrangement of commune-level administrative units in Quảng Ngãi province in 2025. Under the resolution, the entire area and population of Trà Xuân township, Trà Sơn, and Trà Thủy communes, formerly part of Trà Bồng district, were merged to form a new commune named Trà Bồng.
