= Mộ Đức =

Mộ Đức Xã Mộ Đức
- Commune
- Mộ Đức commune
- Location within Vietnam
- Coordinates: 14°56′15″N 108°53′26″E
- Country: Vietnam
- Region: South Central Coast
- Province: Quảng Ngãi
- Time zone: UTC+7 (UTC + 7)

Mộ Đức is a commune (xã) of Quảng Ngãi Province, Vietnam.
