= Khánh Sơn =

- Commune
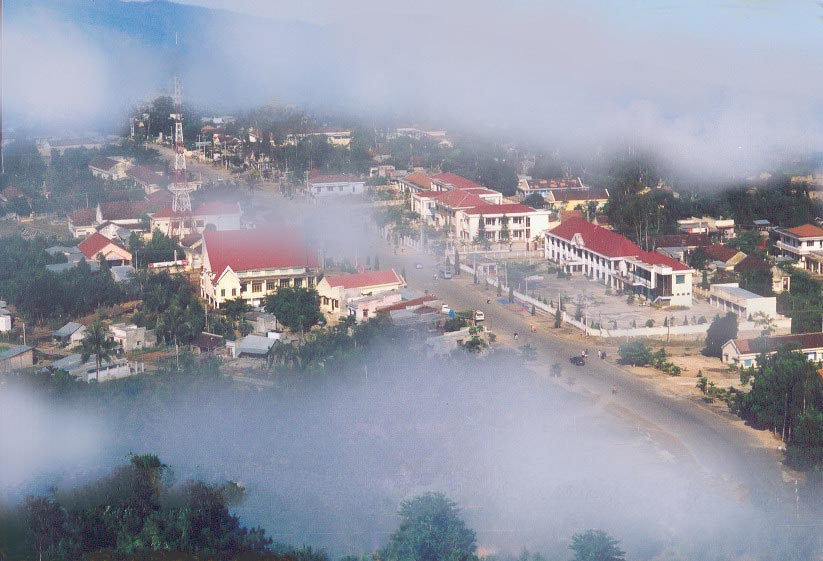
- Interactive map of Khánh Sơn
- Coordinates: 12.0058°N 108.9446°E
- Country: Vietnam
- Region: South Central Coast and Central Highlands
- Province: Khánh Hòa
- Established: 2025
- Administrative headquarters: 06 Lê Duẩn Street, Khánh Sơn commune, Khánh Hòa

Area
  - Total: 98.68 km^{2} (38.10 sq mi)

Population (2025)
  - Total: 11,535
  - Density: 117/km^{2} (300/sq mi)

Khánh Sơn is a commune in Khánh Hòa province, Vietnam.

On 16 June 2025, the Standing Committee of the National Assembly of Vietnam issued Resolution No. 1667/NQ-UBTVQH15 on the arrangement of commune-level administrative units in Khánh Hòa province in 2025, which took effect on the same date. Under the resolution, Tô Hạp township, Sơn Hiệp commune, and Sơn Bình commune were merged to form Khánh Sơn commune.
