= Đức Phổ =

Ward in Quảng Ngãi province, Vietnam

Coordinates: 14.81°N 108.96°E

- Ward
- Interactive map outlining Đức Phổ
- Location within Vietnam
- Country: Vietnam
- Region: South Central Coast
- Province: Quảng Ngãi
- Establish: June 16, 2025

Government
  - Type: Ward

Area
  - Total: 26.77 sq mi (69.33 km^{2})

Population (2025)
  - Total: 41,358 people
  - Density: 1,050/sq mi (405/km^{2})
- Time zone: UTC+7 (UTC + 7)

Đức Phổ is a ward in Quảng Ngãi province, Vietnam. This is one of the 96 communes, wards and special zone in the province.

== Geography ==
Đức Phổ is a coastal ward located in the eastern part of Quảng Ngãi province, 40km south of Cẩm Thành ward, 110km southwest of Kon Tum ward. It borders with Khánh Cường commune to the south, Đặng Thùy Trâm and Nguyễn Nghiêm commune to the west, Trà Câu ward to the north and has a coastline bordering the South China Sea to the east.

== History ==
On June 12, 2025, the National Assembly of Vietnam issued Resolution No. 202/2025/QH15 on the reorganization of provincial-level administrative units. Quảng Ngãi province was established by merging the entire area and population of Kon Tum province and Quảng Ngãi province.

On June 16, 2025, the Standing Committee of the National Assembly of Vietnam issued Resolution No. 1677/NQ-UBTVQH15 on the reorganization of commune-level administrative units in Quảng Ngãi province. Đức Phổ ward was established by merging the entire area and population of Nguyễn Nghiêm, Phổ Hòa, Phổ Vinh, Phổ Ninh and Phổ Minh wards (formerly part of Đức Phổ district-level town).
