= Tây Trà district =

Coordinates: 15°10′15″N 108°21′13″E

Tây Trà District Huyện Tây Trà
- Former District
- Interactive map of Tây Trà District
- Country: Vietnam
- Region: South Central Coast
- Province: Quảng Ngãi
- Established: 2003
- Dissolved: 2020
- District capital: Trà Phong
- Subdivisions: List: 9 communes

Tây Trà is a former district (huyện) of Quảng Ngãi province in the South Central Coast region of Vietnam. As of 2003 the district had a population of 14,904. The district covers an area of 337 km². The district capital lies at Trà Phong.

The district was formed in 2003 from a portion of Trà Bồng district, and was reannexed by Trà Bồng District on January 10, 2020.
