= Đăk Bla =

Ward in Quảng Ngãi province, Vietnam

- Ward
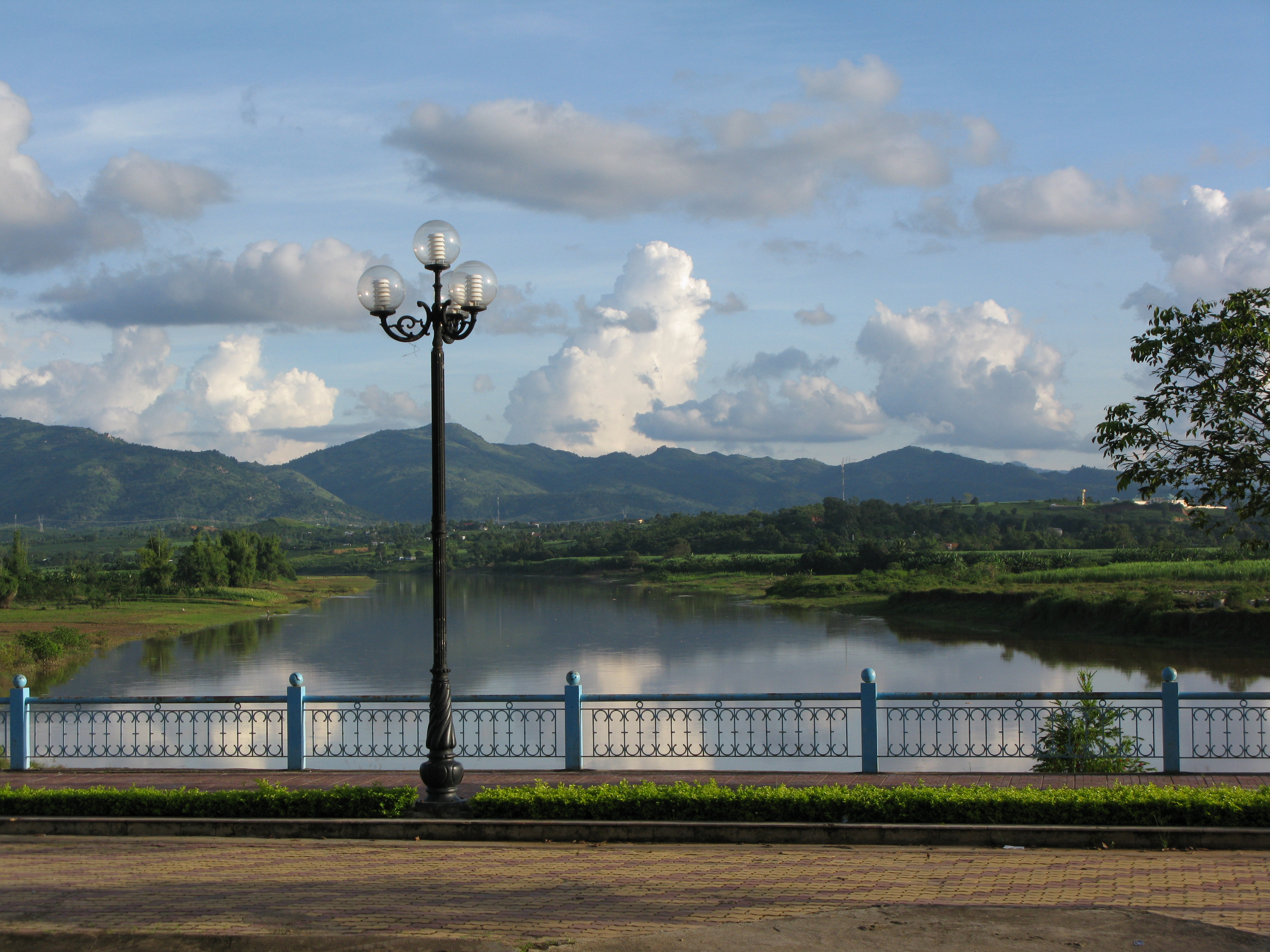
- A view in Đăk Bla ward
- Country: Vietnam
- Region: South Central Coast and Central Highlands
- Province: Quảng Ngãi
- Established: June 16, 2025

Government
  - Type: Ward

Area
  - Total: 14.99 km^{2} (5.79 sq mi)

Population (2025)
  - Total: 21,816
  - Density: 1,455/km^{2} (3,769/sq mi)
- Time zone: UTC+07:00

Đăk Bla is a ward in Quảng Ngãi province, Vietnam. It is one of 96 communes, wards and special zone in the province. Đăk Bla has an area of 14.99 km² and a projected population of 21,816 people in 2025.

== History ==
Prior to 2025, the area of Đăk Bla ward was formerly Trần Hưng Đạo, Lê Lợi and Nguyễn Trãi wards of Kon Tum provincial city, Kon Tum province.

On June 12, 2025, the National Assembly of Vietnam issued Resolution No. 202/2025/QH15 on the reorganization of provincial-level administrative units. Quảng Ngãi province was established by merging the entire area and population of Kon Tum province and Quảng Ngãi province.

On June 16, 2025, the Standing Committee of the National Assembly of Vietnam issued Resolution No. 1677/NQ-UBTVQH15 on the reorganization of commune-level administrative units in Quảng Ngãi province. Đăk Bla ward was established by merging the entire area and population of Trần Hưng Đạo, Lê Lợi and Nguyễn Trãi wards (formerly part of Kon Tum provincial city).
