= H're people =

H're
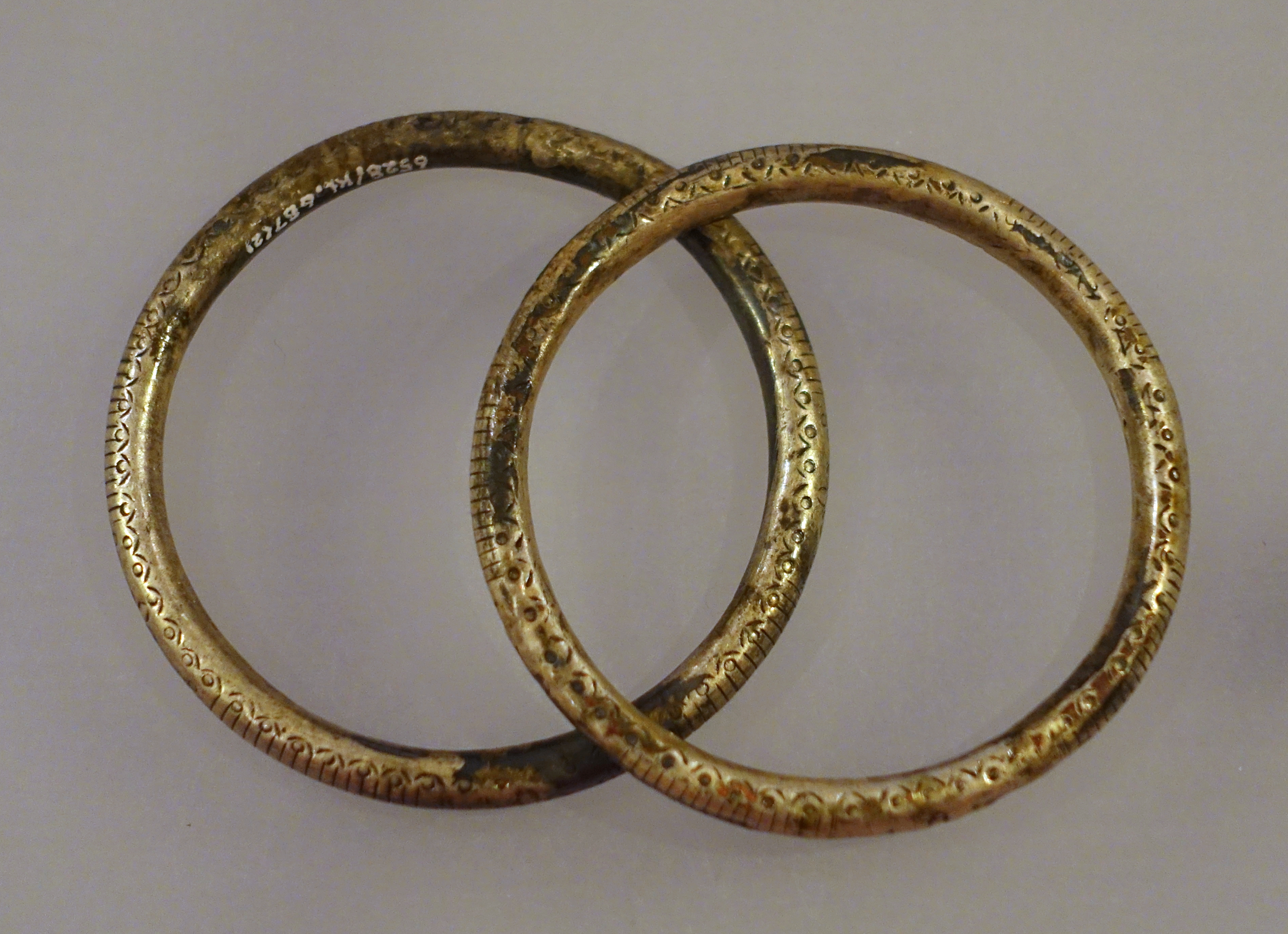
- Silver bracelets of H're Quảng Ngãi, 1946 - Vietnamese Women's Museum - Hanoi

Total population
- 149,460 (2019)

Regions with significant populations
- Vietnam : Quảng Ngãi, Bình Định

Languages
- Hrê • Vietnamese

Religion
- Mahayana Buddhism

The H're people (Vietnamese: người H'rê) are an ethnic group of Vietnam that speak a language in the Mon–Khmer family. Most H're live in Quảng Ngãi, though a minority live in the Bình Định and Kon Tum provinces of Central Vietnam.

In 2015, the population of H're in Quảng Ngãi province was 132,745 people consists of

- Ba Tơ District : 48,852 people
- Sơn Hà District : 65,823 people
- Minh Long District : 13,478 people
- Quảng Ngãi city and other districts : 4.592 people

A third of the population of An Lão District in Bình Định Province were Hre in 1996 (around 5,800 people).

== History ==
In the old ages, the H're used to call themselves following the river name of their residence. During the Nguyễn dynasty, the H're were recognized by some other names such as Chăm Rê, Chăm Quảng Ngãi, Thượng Ba Tơ, Man Thạch Bích, Mọi Ðá Vách.

== Economic Activities ==
The H're are mainly residents of wet rice cultivation, just a small part of them cultivate slash-and-burn agriculture.

Their popular livestock are buffalos, pigs, dogs and chickens. The only handicrafts are wickerwork and weaving, but less developed now, especially weaving is only left in a few areas.

== Culture ==
In their traditional festivals, H're people widely use their special kind of gong named chiêng Ba - a trio of a father, a mother and a child gong - to play performance based on four basic melodies Chinh Năng, Chinh K’oa, Chinh H’lay và Chinh Tuguốc.
