= Hải Châu =

Hải Châu is the name given to several places in Vietnam:

- Hải Châu: ward and administrative center of Da Nang city.
- Hải Châu: commune in Nghệ An province.
- Hải Châu: former urban district and administrative center of Da Nang city (today is Hải Châu ward and Hòa Cường ward of Da Nang city).
