= Cẩm Thành =

Ward and capital of Quảng Ngãi province, Vietnam

- Ward
- Phạm Văn Đồng square
- Interactive map of Cẩm Thành
- Country: Vietnam
- Region: South Central Coast
- Province: Quảng Ngãi
- Established: June 16, 2025

Area
  - Total: 7.93 km^{2} (3.06 sq mi)

Population (2025)
  - Total: 60,996 people
  - Density: 7,690/km^{2} (19,900/sq mi)
- Time zone: UTC+07:00

Cẩm Thành is a ward and capital of Quảng Ngãi province, Vietnam. It is one of 96 communes, wards, and special zone in the province.

== Geography ==
Cẩm Thành is a ward located in the eastern part of Quảng Ngãi province, 190km northeast of Kon Tum ward. It borders Trương Quang Trọng ward to the north, Nghĩa Lộ ward to the west, Tư Nghĩa commune to the south and An Phú commune to the east.

== Administrative divisions ==
Cẩm Thành is divided into 25 neighborhoods, numbered from 1 to 25.

== History ==
Prior to 2025, the area of Cẩm Thành ward was formerly Nguyễn Nghiêm, Trần Hưng Đạo, Nghĩa Chánh and Chánh Lộ wards of Quảng Ngãi provincial city in Quảng Ngãi province.

On June 12, 2025, the National Assembly of Vietnam issued Resolution No. 202/2025/QH15 on the reorganization of provincial-level administrative units. Quảng Ngãi province was established by merging the entire area and population of Kon Tum province and Quảng Ngãi province.

On June 16, 2025, the Standing Committee of the National Assembly of Vietnam issued Resolution No. 1677/NQ-UBTVQH15 on the reorganization of commune-level administrative units in Quảng Ngãi province. Cẩm Thành ward was established by merging the entire area and population of Nguyễn Nghiêm, Trần Hưng Đạo, Nghĩa Chánh and Chánh Lộ wards (formerly part of Quảng Ngãi provincial city).
