= Trà Khúc River =

River in Vietnam

Trà Khúc River (Vietnamese: Sông Trà Khúc) is a river in Vietnam. It is the largest river in Quảng Ngãi Province.

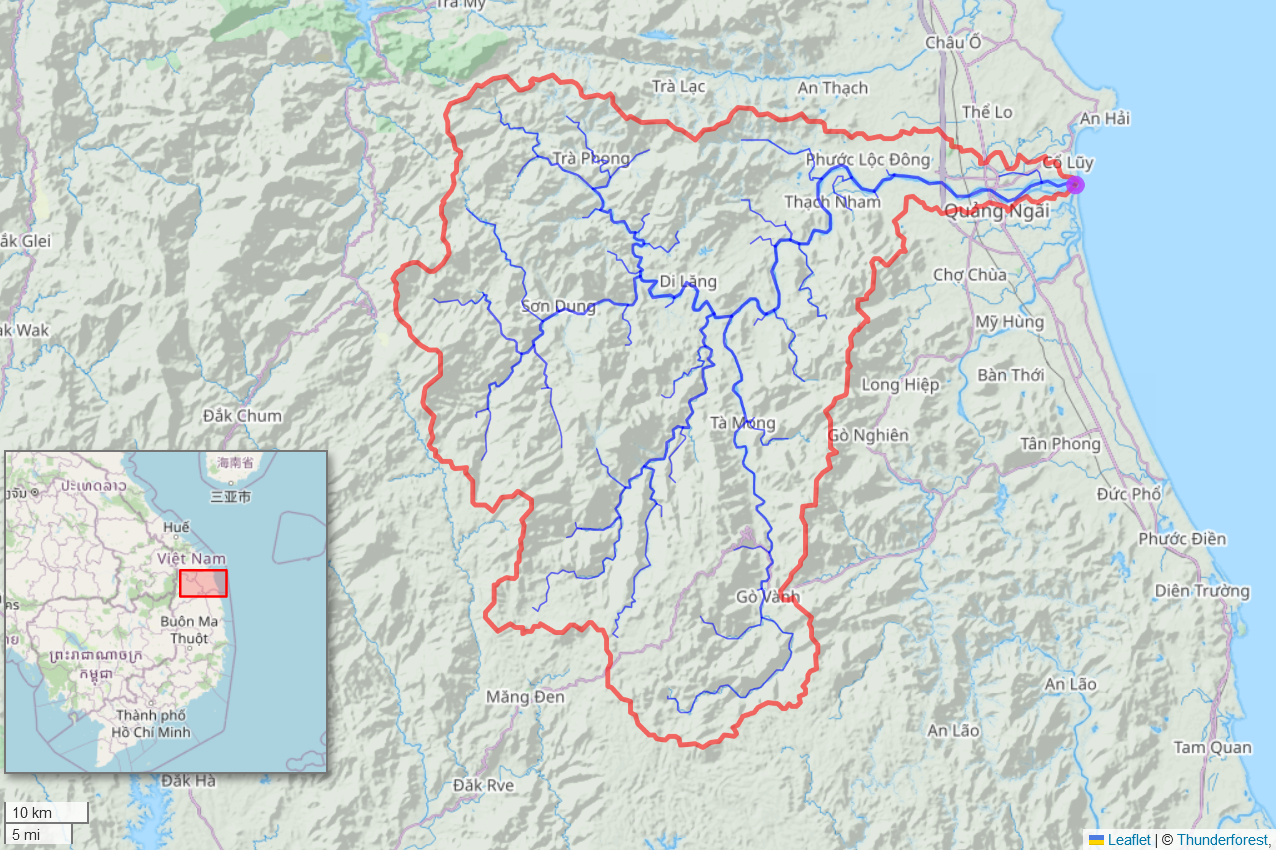
Map of the Trà Khúc watershed in Vietnam

It flows through the following places:

- Sơn Tây District
- Sơn Hà District
- Tư Nghĩa District
- Sơn Tịnh District
- Quảng Ngãi City

Much of it can be used as an inland waterway, extending inland far beyond Quảng Ngãi City into Sơn Hà District.

There is a hydroelectric station on the Trà Khúc River in the center of Quảng Ngãi Province. It is located near the border of Sơn Hà District with Tư Nghĩa District and Sơn Tịnh District.
