= Sơn Tây district =

Coordinates: 14.9639°N 108.3642°E

Sơn Tây district Huyện Sơn Tây
- District
- Interactive map of Sơn Tây district
- Country: Vietnam
- Region: South Central Coast
- Province: Quảng Ngãi
- Capital: Sơn Dung

Area
  - Total: 147 sq mi (381 km^{2})

Population (2003)
  - Total: 15,164
- Time zone: UTC+7 (UTC + 7)

Sơn Tây is a district (huyện) of Quảng Ngãi province in the South Central Coastal region of Vietnam. As of 2003 the district had a population of 15,164. The district covers an area of 381 km^{2}. The district capital lies at Sơn Dung.
