= Quảng Ngãi province =

Province of Vietnam

Quảng Ngãi
- Province
- Tỉnh Quảng Ngãi 省廣義
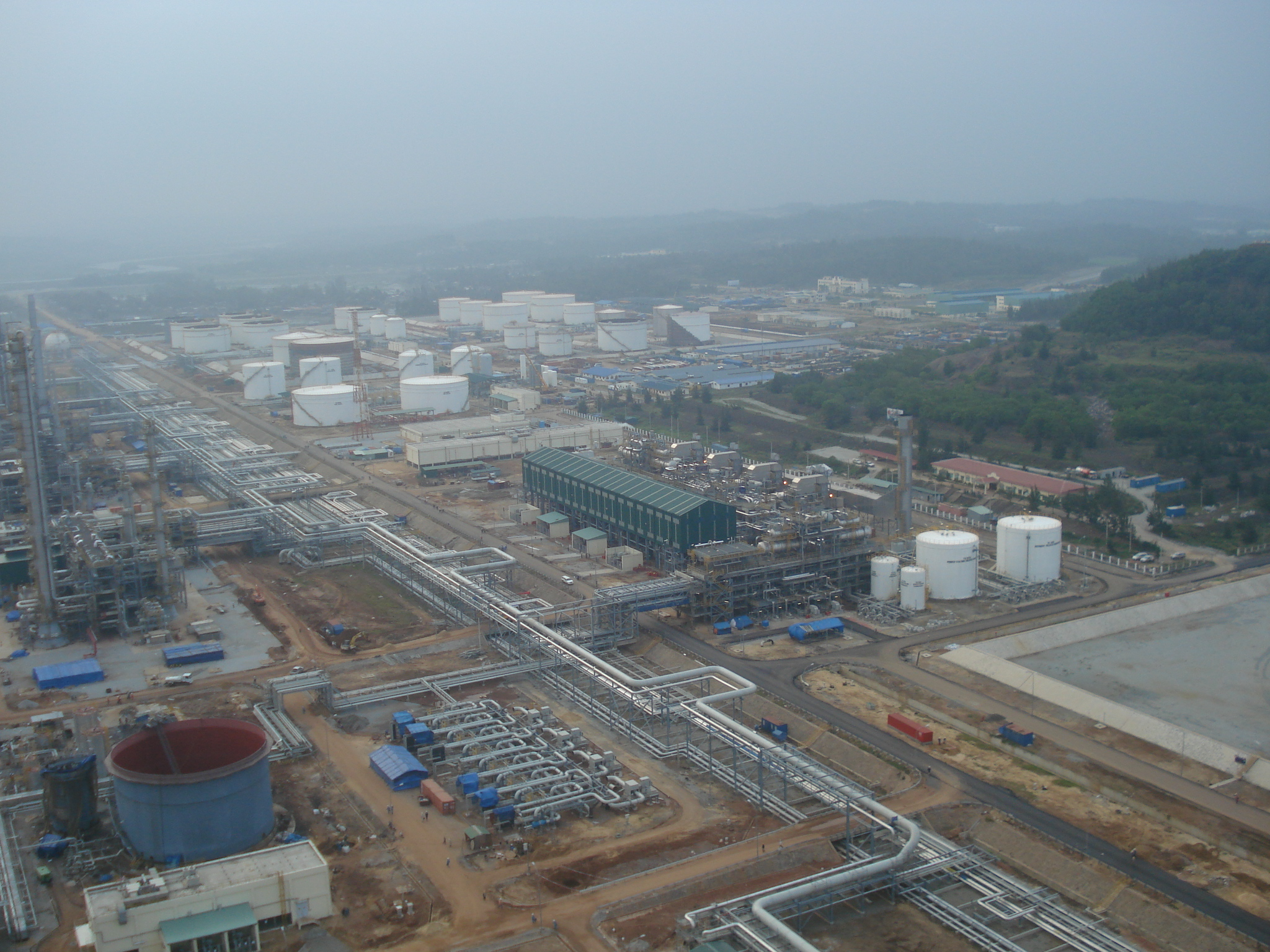
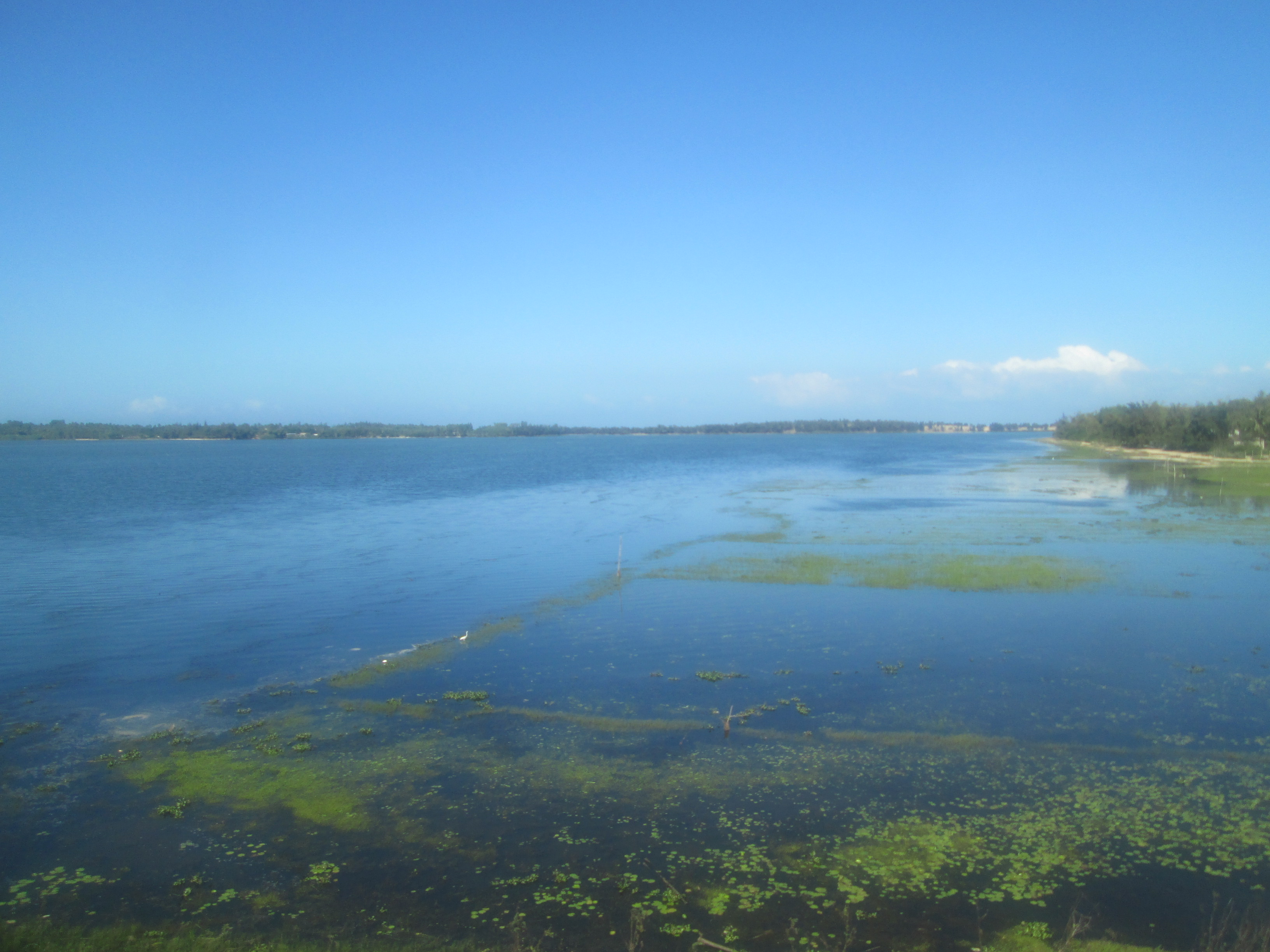
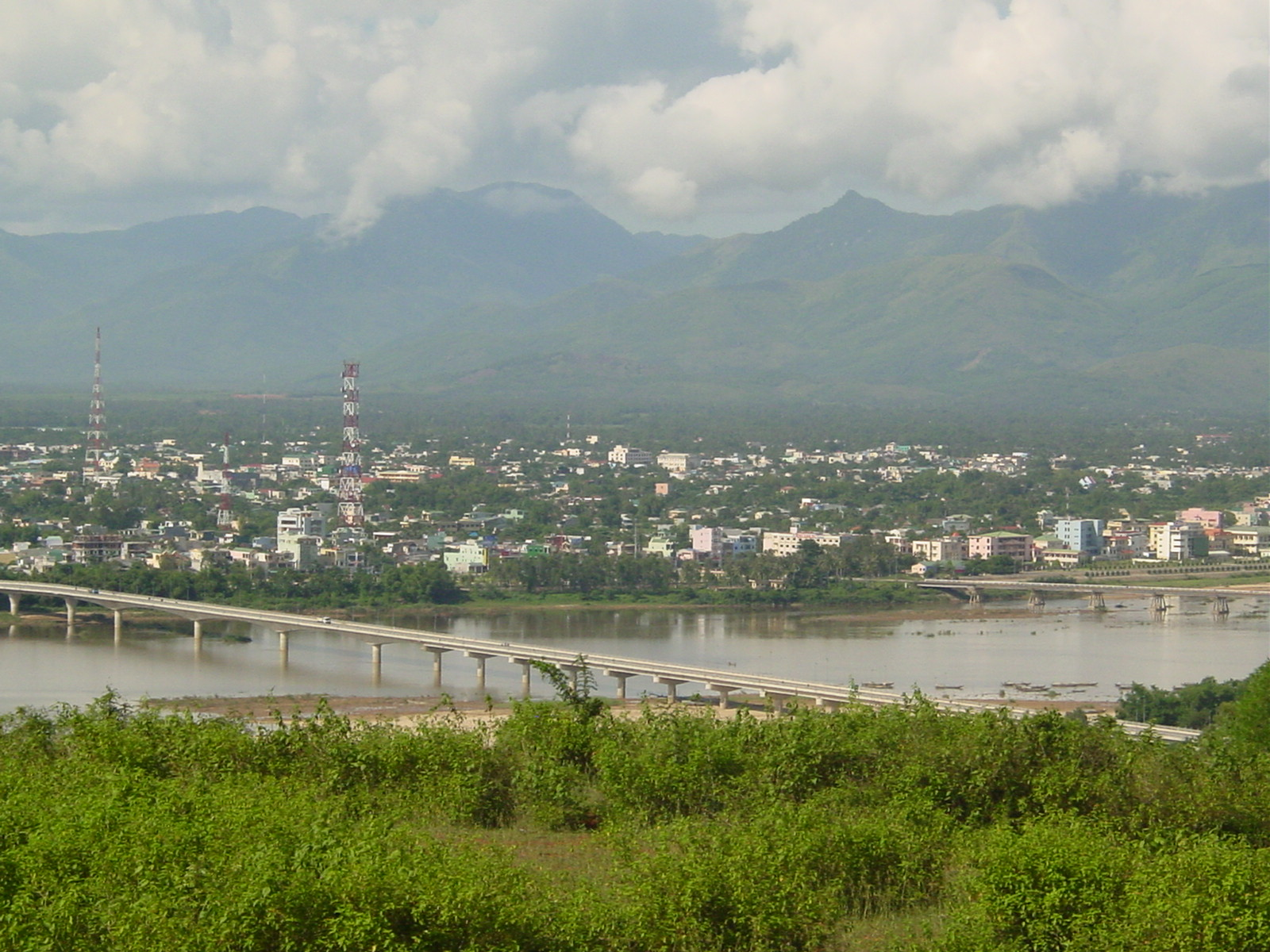
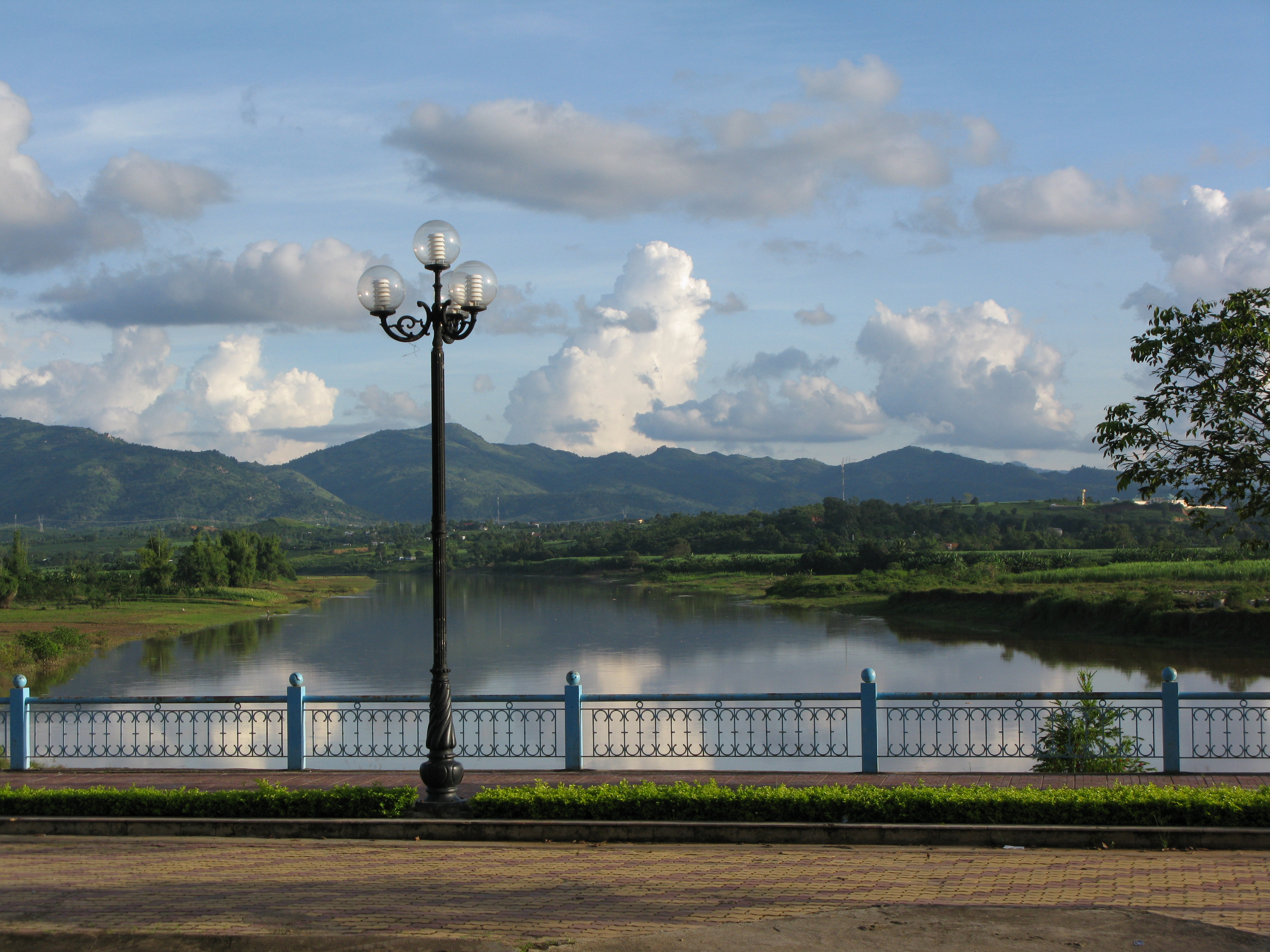
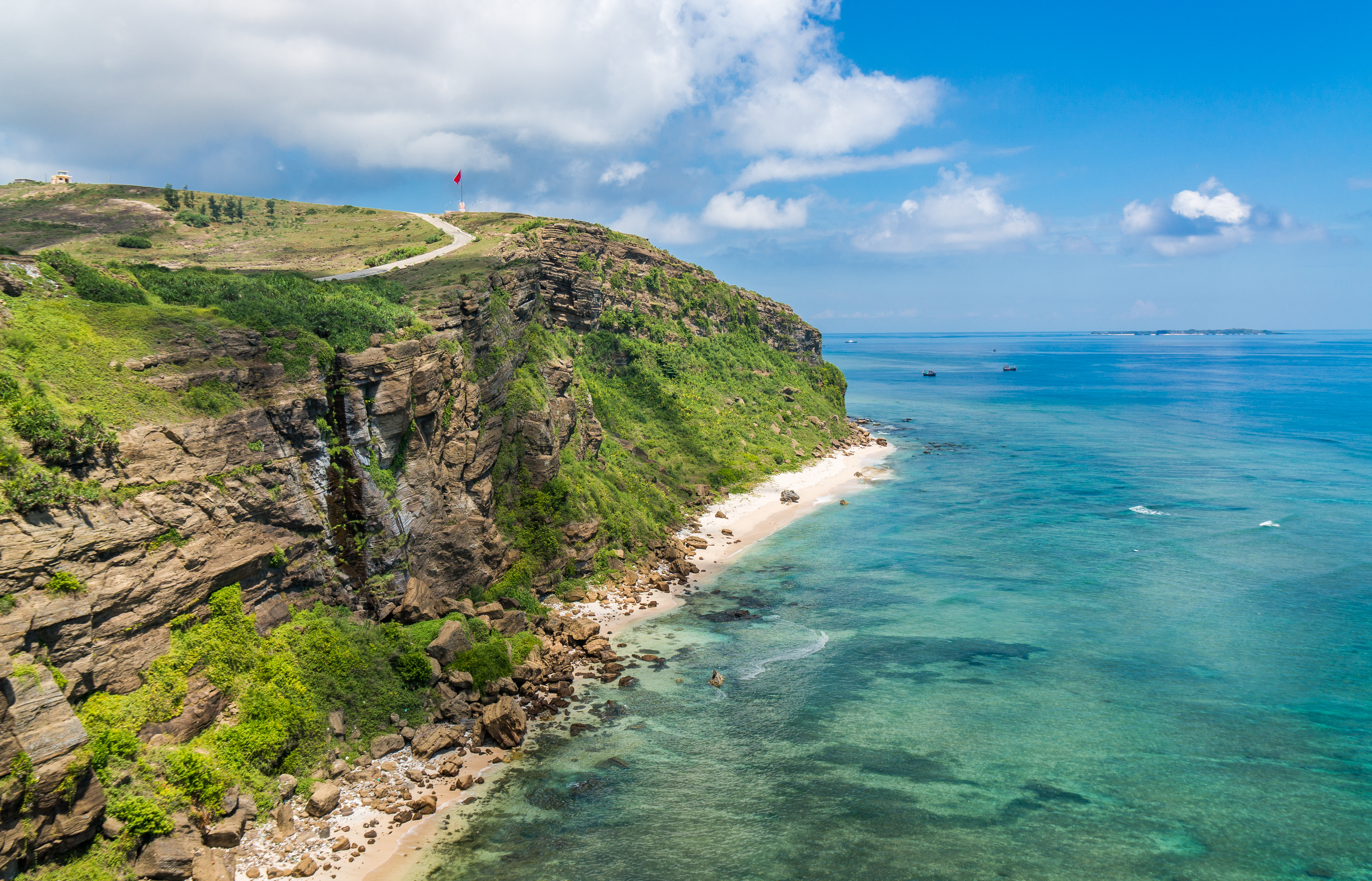
- Dung Quất refinery An Khê lagoon A view in Nghĩa Lộ ward Đăk Bla river Măng Đen plateau Lý Sơn

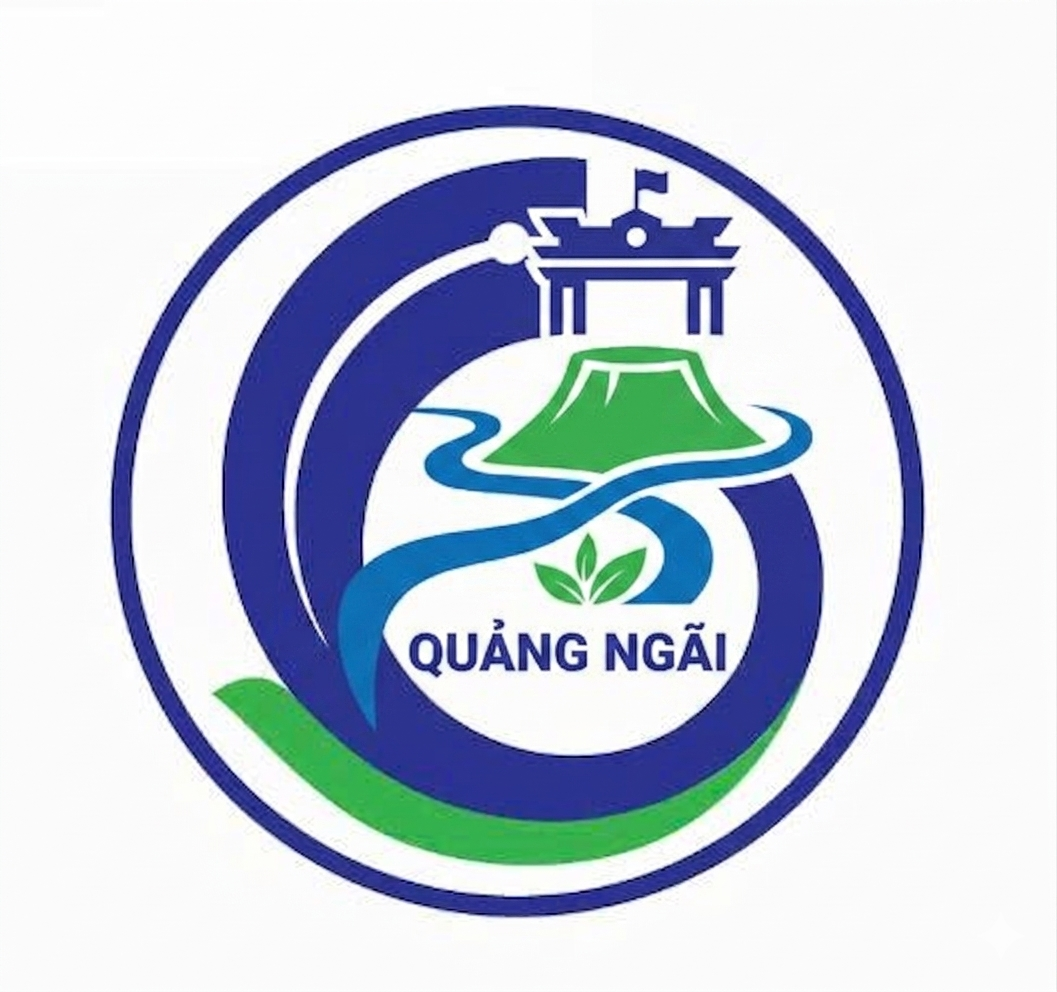
- Seal

- Location of Quảng Ngãi within Vietnam
- Interactive map of Quảng Ngãi
- Coordinates: 15°0′N 108°40′E
- Country: Vietnam
- Region: South Central Coast and Central Highlands
- Capital: Cẩm Thành ward

Government
  - Party secretary: Bùi Thị Quỳnh Vân
  - People's Council Chair: Bùi Thị Quỳnh Vân
  - People's Committee Chair: Nguyễn Hoàng Giang

Area
  - Total: 14,832.55 km^{2} (5,726.88 sq mi)

Population (2025)
  - Total: 2,161,755
  - Density: 145.7440/km^{2} (377.4752/sq mi)

Demographics
  - Ethnicities: Vietnamese, Hrê, Co, Xơ Đăng, Chăm

GDP
  - Total: VND 73.568 trillion US$3.195 billion
- Time zone: UTC+7 (ICT)
- Area codes: 55 (until 16 July 2017); 255 (from 17 June 2017)
- ISO 3166 code: VN-29
- HDI (2020): ▲0.724 (25th)
- Website: www.quangngai.gov.vn

Quảng Ngãi (Vietnamese pronunciation: [kwâŋ ŋǎjˀ]) is a province in South Central Coast and Central Highlands region of Vietnam. The province borders Da Nang to the north, the South China Sea to the east, Gia Lai to the south, the Lao provinces of Sekong and Attapeu, and the Cambodian province of Ratanakiri to the west.

The province's administrative is Cẩm Thành ward, located 130 km south of Đà Nẵng, 820 km north of Ho Chi Minh City, and 908 km south of Hà Nội along the National Route 1. Quảng Ngãi has a 129 km coastline with a territorial sea of 11,000 km^{2} (4,200 sq mi).

The province was re-established in July 1989, on the basis of separating Nghĩa Bình province into 2 provinces of Quảng Ngãi and Bình Định. In May 2025, it was merged with the Central Highlands province of Kon Tum, forming the new Quảng Ngãi Province with an area of 14,833 km^{2} (5,727 sq mi) and a population of 2,161,755 people.

The province has been historically populated with H're, Cham, and Kinh peoples. Quảng Ngãi has been one of the least economically developed provinces in Vietnam and has achieved progress in poverty reduction. While being a net contributor to the national budget thanks to the presence of a planned oil and gas industry, the province is one of the 20 provinces with the lowest income per capita in Vietnam.

== Geography ==
Quảng Ngãi's topography is dominated by a plain along the coast and in the center of the province and by mountains and hills in the west. Lowlands extend further inland along Trà Khúc River. The province's highest peak is at 1630m in the west of the province near the border to Quảng Nam. The coastline is straighter in most of the south and central part of the province and features capes north of Quảng Ngãi City.

== History ==
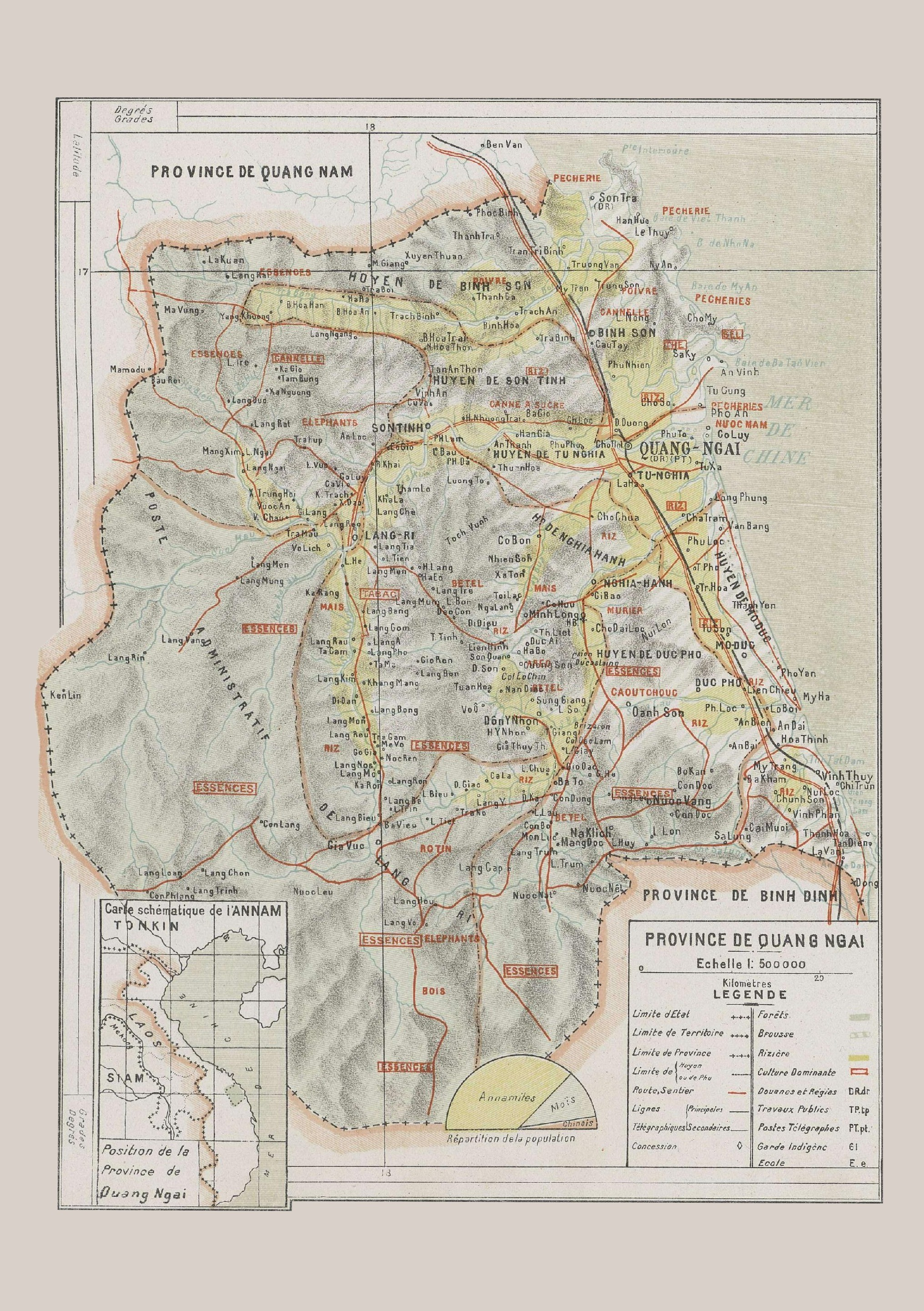
Map of Quang Ngai province in 1909

The Sa Huỳnh culture inhabited what later is Quảng Ngãi. Remains of it were found in Sa Huỳnh, Đức Phổ District. Compared to the Quảng Nam province and Vijaya (Bình Định province), there are fewer Cham remains in Quảng Ngãi. The area became part of Vietnam along with Bình Định province in 1471 following the Champa–Đại Việt War.

In the 19th century, the Long Wall of Quảng Ngãi was constructed in the province, which improved security among the Vietnamese and H're people and facilitated trade. The province had become a center for religious activity, in particular with the construction of a mountain-top monastery, the Thiên Ấn Mountain Pagoda in 1695.

In the lead up to the August Revolution, Quảng Ngãi province was one of the first provinces in central Vietnam (along with Quảng Trị) to organize self-defense units in March 1945. The Ba Tơ Guerrilla Unit mobilized tens of thousands of peasants.

After reunification, the province was designated as the center of a planned oil industry, including the Dung Quất Refinery alongside an economic zone for the development of heavy and light industries.

== Administrative divisions ==
Quảng Ngãi province is divided into 96 commune-level administrative units, include 9 wards, 86 communes and 1 special zone:

- 9 wards: Cẩm Thành (capital), Đăk Bla, Đăk Cấm, Đức Phổ, Kon Tum, Nghĩa Lộ, Sa Huỳnh, Trà Câu, Trương Quang Trọng.
- 86 communes: An Phú, Ba Dinh, Ba Động, Ba Gia, Ba Tơ, Ba Tô, Ba Vinh, Ba Vì, Ba Xa, Bình Chương, Bình Minh, Bình Sơn, Bờ Y, Cà Đam, Dục Nông, Đăk Hà, Đăk Kôi, Đăk Long, Đăk Ma, Đăk Môn, Đăk Pék, Đăk Plô, Đăk Pxi, Đăk Rơ Wa, Đăk Rve, Đăk Sao, Đăk Tô, Đăk Tờ Kan, Đăk Ui, Đặng Thùy Trâm, Đình Cương, Đông Sơn, Đông Trà Bồng, Ia Chim, Ia Đal, Ia Tơi, Khánh Cường, Kon Braih, Kon Đào, Kon Plông, Lân Phong, Long Phụng, Măng Bút, Măng Đen, Măng Ri, Minh Long, Mỏ Cày, Mô Rai, Mộ Đức, Nghĩa Giang, Nghĩa Hành, Ngọc Linh, Ngọc Bay, Ngọc Réo, Ngọc Tụ, Nguyễn Nghiêm, Phước Giang, Rờ Kơi, Sa Bình, Sa Loong, Sa Thầy, Sơn Hà, Sơn Hạ, Sơn Kỳ, Sơn Linh, Sơn Mai, Sơn Tây, Sơn Tây Hạ, Sơn Tây Thượng, Sơn Thủy, Sơn Tịnh, Tây Trà, Tây Trà Bồng, Thanh Bồng, Thiện Tín, Thọ Phong, Tịnh Khê, Trà Bồng, Trà Giang, Trường Giang, Tu Mơ Rông, Tư Nghĩa, Vạn Tường, Vệ Giang, Xốp, Ya Ly.
- 1 special zone: Lý Sơn.

== Demography ==
The province had a population of 1,219,200 in 2009. Around 40% is concentrated in former Quảng Ngãi provincial city and the two districts just north and south of it, where population density ranges from over 500 to 3600/km^{2}). Population density in most of coastal Quảng Ngãi is around 400/km^{2}. The five western districts have population densities of less than 100/km^{2}, three of them (Tây Trà, Sơn Tây, and Ba Tơ) less than 50/km^{2}. Quảng Ngãi is the least urbanized province of the South Central Coast, with 14.4% of the population living in cities and towns. The population grew by an annual average of 1% between 2000 and 2007, while the growth of the urban population was 3.9% on average.

The coastal lowlands are mostly ethnically homogeneous, with more than 99% of the population made up of Kinh people. There are Hrê communities in the southwest of the province. They made up the majority of the population in the districts of Ba Tơ, Sơn Hà (which then also included Sơn Tây), and Minh Long as of 1996. A majority in Trà Bồng District (which then also included the Tây Trà District) were Co people. There is a minority of Xơ Đăng in Sơn Hà District. Chams are also found on the southern coast of this province.

== Economy ==
The economy of the province has historically relied on agriculture and fishing, and in later years has seen industrialization with the application of trade rules. The economy of Quang Ngai and surrounding regions is designated for the development of heavy industries; in particular, trade-oriented export and special economic rules apply to parts of the province. The Dung Quất Economic Zone located within the province has a separate visa regime for foreigners seeking to work within the country.

Industrial output within the province has seen growth rates of 15–20% annually, far outstripping most other regions in central Vietnam. The Dung Quất Economic Zone is recognized as one of five key coastal sites for economic growth in Vietnam, and has seen Japanese foreign direct investments.

Quảng Ngãi's GDP per capita was 7.82 million VND in 2007, making it the second poorest province in the South Central Coast (after Ninh Thuận). Quảng Ngãi's economy has been booming since then, due to an increase in industrial GDP from the Dung Quat Economic Zone. It grew by 21% in 2009, increasing GDP per capita to 15.2 million VND, higher than that of its neighbours, Quảng Nam and Bình Định provinces. Exports increased from 31 million US$ in 2005 to 182 million in 2009.

The number of employed people increased from 571,400 in 2000 to 704,700, while there is a decline in agricultural and fishing employment. The booming industrial sector created 63,200 jobs in the period and employs 99,200 as of 2007. While lacking behind the industrial sector in terms of value-added, the service sector employed 180,500 people in 2007 compared to 57,900 in 2000.

=== Agriculture, forestry, fishing ===
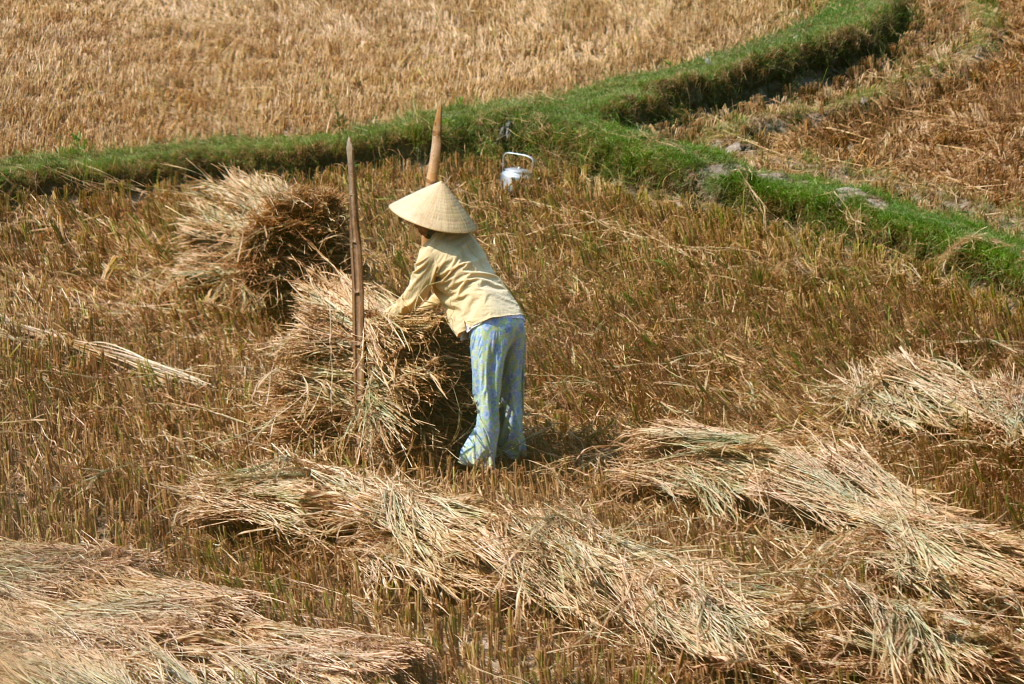
Farmer in Quảng Ngãi province

Quảng Ngãi's agricultural GDP is lower compared to other provinces in the region. Rice cultivation takes up the largest area, concentrated around Quảng Ngãi City. 381,200t of rice were harvested in 2007. Other crops include sugar-cane, peanuts, and coconuts. There is a number of cattle in the province (287,800 in 2007), mostly in the northwest and southwest.

| Crop | Area | Output (2007) | % of national | Main location(s) |
|---|---|---|---|---|
| Sugar-cane | 7300ha | 390,900t | 2.25 | Bình Sơn district |
| Peanuts | 5700ha | 11,100t | 2.2 | Đức Phổ district |
| Coconuts | 2700ha | 13,726t | 1.31 | Mộ Đức district |

Quảng Ngãi's fishing output as a share of total national output is larger than its population share. Lý Sơn island plays a role as an offshore fishing center. It contributed almost one fourth to the total of 126,000 tonnes of fish caught in 2012. In contrast to the rest of the region, there is a lack of rich fishing grounds off the coast of Quảng Ngãi province.

=== Industry ===
Quảng Ngãi City is a secondary industrial center of the South Central Coast with processing of agricultural products and production of some paper and machinery. Other products include beer (38.3 million litres in 2007), textiles (5,577 pieces), bricks (303 million), chemical fertilizer (24kt), and hand farming tools (352,000 pieces). Furniture is produced in Quảng Ngãi as an export product, accounting for 11.475 million US$ in 2007.

Industrial GDP has more than tripled between 2000 and 2007, growing by an average yearly rate of 18.64%. This was the second highest growth rate in the South Central Coast after Bình Thuận province. Industry has grown even faster since then, due in large part to the Dung Quat Economic Zone. The Dung Quất Refinery, Vietnam's first oil refinery, started production in February 2009. In the same year, industrial gross output increased by 144.7% and the share of industry in the province's GDP surged from 36.2% in 2008 to 46.3% in 2009. This share is higher than that of other provinces in the region and higher than that of Da Nang. The province's prospects for industry may also be changing outside Dung Quat Economic Zone. Vinatex bought Đại Cát Tường, a formerly bankrupt textile manufacturer, in 2011 and plans to expand its production in Quảng Ngãi.

Quảng Ngãi's industry was dominated by the state sector (mostly centrally managed companies) until 2005, after which most of the state industry was (officially) privatized. The state sector's share decreased from 2/3 in 2000 to around 1/8 in 2007, while there was a restructuring within the state sector from central state to locally managed state enterprises.

== Infrastructure ==
=== Transport ===
Quang Ngai is a transportation hub, with National Route 1, the North-South East Expressway, the North-South railway line (including 10 stations within the province), and the Quang Ngai – Da Nang Expressway running through the province. Of these, the length of National Route 1 passing through the province is 98 km. The North-South East Expressway through the province is 125 km long. National Route 24 connects National Route 1 at the junction in Thach Tru village, Duc Lan commune, Mo Duc district, passes through Duc Pho town and Ba To district to connect with Kon Tum province with a length of 69 km, and National Route 24B is 18 km long; this is a traffic route for Kon Tum province and Quang Ngai in economic and cultural relations between the coast and the Central Highlands, exchanging goods and developing the mountainous economy associated with national security and defense. To the north, the province borders Chu Lai Airport in Nui Thanh district (Quang Nam province). Quang Ngai province has Dung Quat Port (Binh Son). This is a national general seaport with wind protection, having the 5th largest total cargo throughput nationwide (in 2019), with the capacity to handle liquid cargo (petrochemical refining) and bulk cargo. This port cluster is capable of receiving various types of ships with different sizes depending on the berth. In particular, Hoa Phat Dung Quat Port has allowed ships with sizes up to 200,000 DWT to dock thanks to its depth and shipping lanes. With a 144 km coastline, Quang Ngai has estuaries and smaller-scale ports such as Sa Ky, Sa Can, Cua Dai, My A, Sa Huynh, and Ben Dinh (Ly Son), with potential for water transport, trade, and tourism.

=== Energy ===
There is a hydroelectric station on Trà Khúc River in the center of the province. It is located near the border of Sơn Hà district with Tư Nghĩa district and Sơn Tịnh district. As of 2007, 401 million kwh were generated in the province.
