= Cái River (Khánh Hòa) =

River in Vietnam

Cái Cái Nha Trang
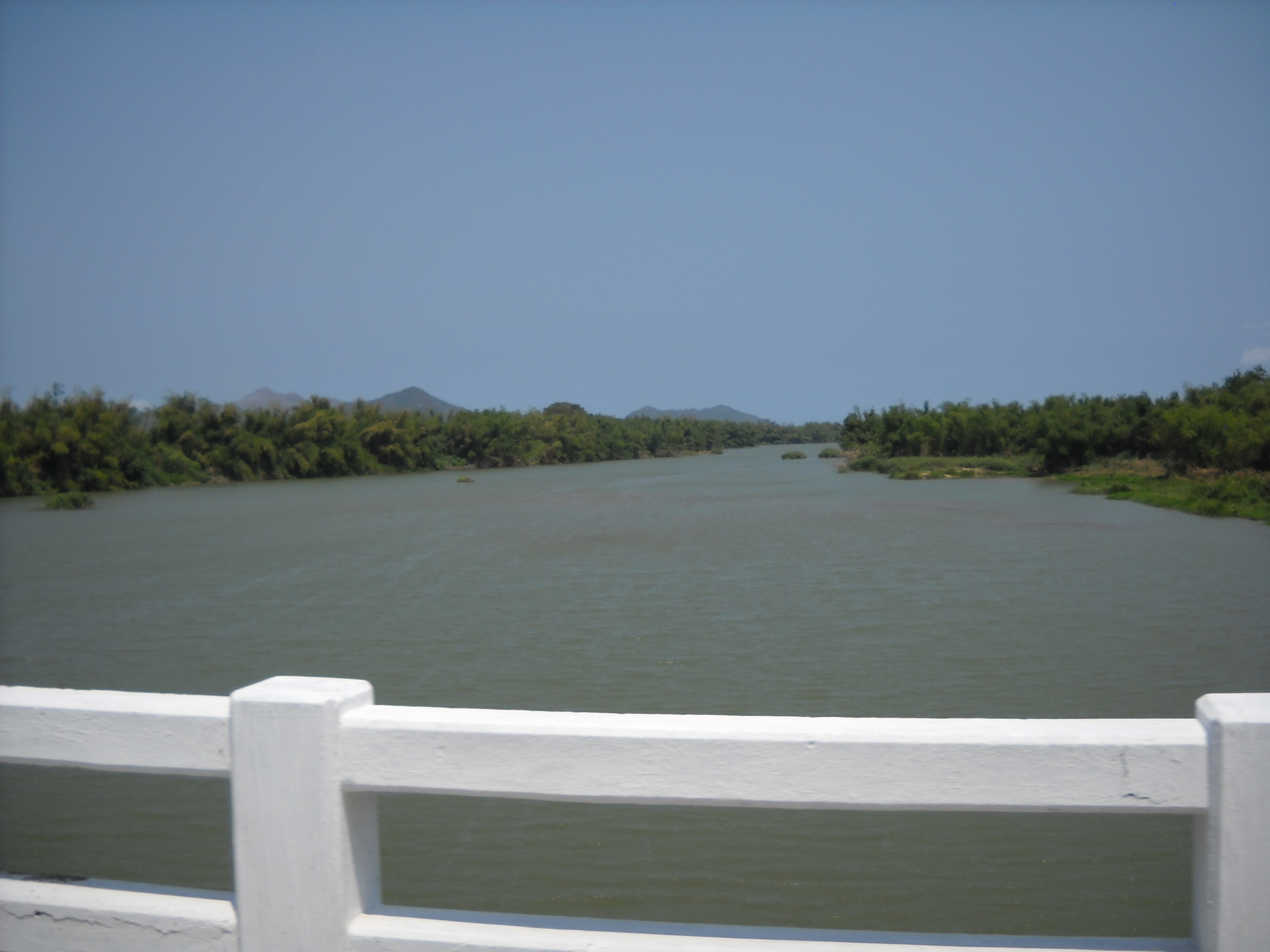

Location
- Country: Vietnam
- Province: Khánh Hòa

Physical characteristics
- Source
  - coordinates: 12°20′38″N 108°44′54″E
- Mouth
  - coordinates: 12°15′48″N 109°11′52″E

The Cái River (Vietnamese: sông Cái) is a river of Khánh Hòa Province, Vietnam. The river has a basin area of 1904 km².
