= Hải Châu, Da Nang =

Ward and capital of Đà Nẵng city, Vietnam

Hải Châu
- Ward
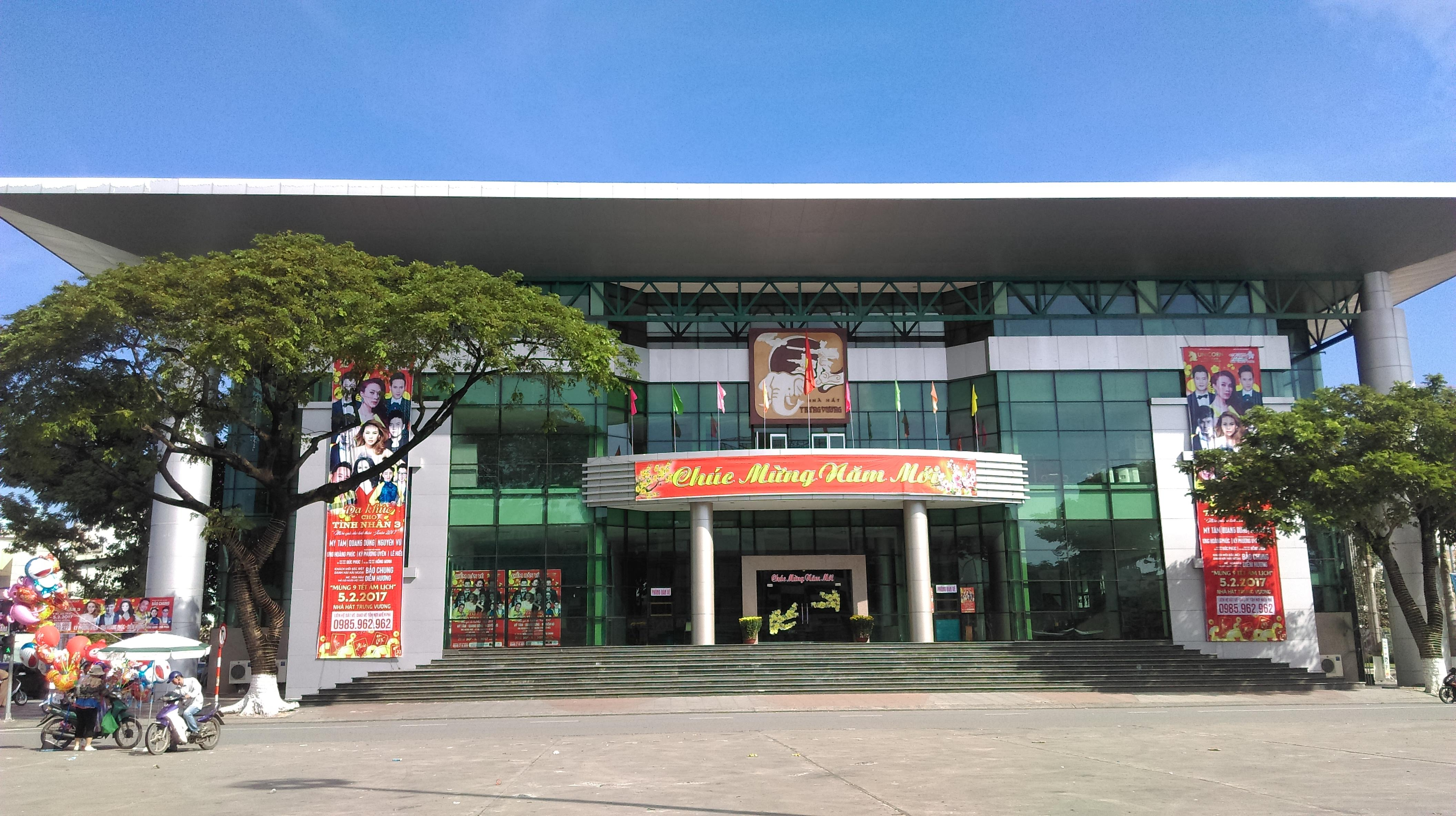
- Trưng Vương Theatre
- Interactive map of Hải Châu
- Coordinates: 16°04′30″N 108°13′08″E
- Country: Vietnam
- Region: South Central Coast
- Centrally- governed city: Da Nang
- Established: 16 June 2025

Area
  - Total: 7.58 km^{2} (2.93 sq mi)

Population (2025)
  - Total: 131,427 people
  - Density: 17,300/km^{2} (44,900/sq mi)
- Time zone: UTC+07:00

Hải Châu is a ward in Da Nang city, Vietnam. It is the administrative center of Da Nang city and one of the 94 communes, wards and special zone of the city.

== Geography ==
Hải Châu is a ward located in the northern part of Da Nang city, 25 km north of Hội An ward.
