= Minh Long district =

Coordinates: 14.917°N 108.617°E

Minh Long District Huyện Minh Long
- District
- Interactive map of Minh Long District
- Country: Vietnam
- Region: South Central Coast
- Province: Quảng Ngãi
- Capital: Long Hiệp

Area
  - Total: 83 sq mi (216 km^{2})

Population (2003)
  - Total: 14,634
- Time zone: UTC+7 (UTC + 7)

Minh Long is a former district (huyện) of Quảng Ngãi province in the South Central Coast region of Vietnam.

As of 2003 the district had a population of 14,634. The district covers an area of 216 km^{2} (83 sq mi). The district capital lies at Long Hiệp.
