= Sơn Hà district =

Coordinates: 15.000°N 108.417°E

Sơn Hà district Huyện Sơn Hà
- District
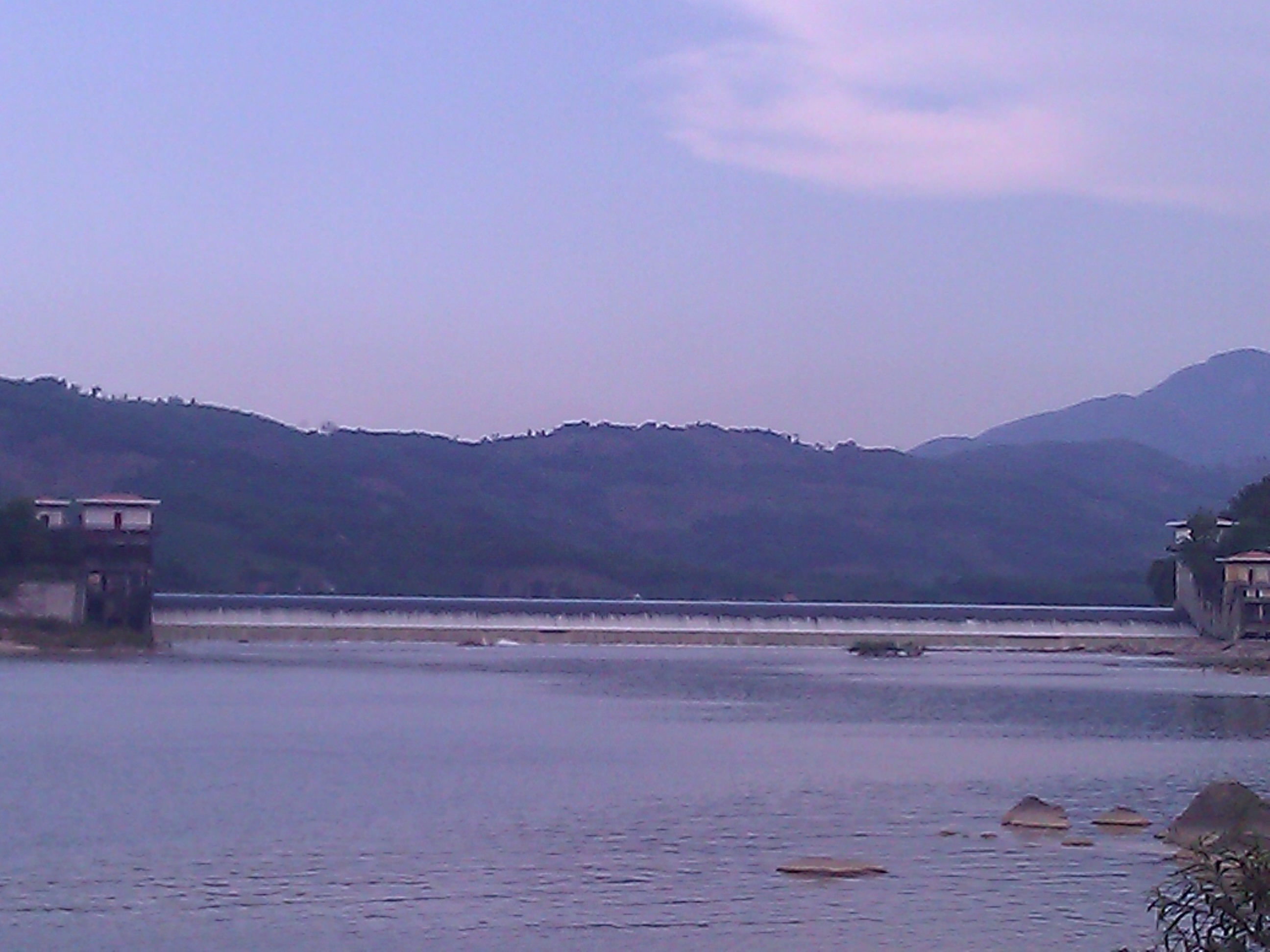
- View of Thạch Nham river
- Interactive map of Sơn Hà district
- Country: Vietnam
- Region: South Central Coast
- Province: Quảng Ngãi
- Capital: Di Lăng

Area
  - Total: 290 sq mi (750 km^{2})

Population (2003)
  - Total: 64,398
- Time zone: UTC+7 (UTC + 7)

Sơn Hà is a former rural district (huyện) of Quảng Ngãi province in the South Central Coast region of Vietnam. As of 2003 the district had a population of 64,398. The district covers an area of 750 km^{2} (290 sq mi). The district capital lies at Di Lăng.
