= Trà Bồng district =

Coordinates: 15.167°N 108.417°E

Trà Bồng district Huyện Trà Bồng
- District
- Interactive map of Trà Bồng district
- Country: Vietnam
- Region: South Central Coast
- Province: Quảng Ngãi
- Capital: Trà Xuân

Area
  - Total: 293.57 sq mi (760.34 km^{2})

Population (2019)
  - Total: 53,379
  - Density: 180/sq mi (70/km^{2})
- Time zone: UTC+7 (UTC + 7)

Trà Bồng is a former district (huyện) of Quảng Ngãi province in the South Central Coast region of Vietnam. As of 2019 the district had a population of 53,379. The district covers an area of 760.34 km^{2} (293.57 sq mi). The district capital lies at Trà Xuân.
