= South Central Coast and Central Highlands =

Region of Vietnam

South Central Coast and Central Highlands Duyên hải Nam Trung Bộ và Tây Nguyên
- South Central Coast and Central Highlands (South Central Coast)
- Country: Vietnam
- Centrally- governed city (1): Da Nang
- Province (5): Quảng Ngãi, Gia Lai, Đắk Lắk, Khánh Hòa, Lâm Đồng

Area
  - Total: 99,153.43 km^{2} (38,283.35 sq mi)

Population
  - Total: 15,872,800 people
  - Density: 160.083/km^{2} (414.614/sq mi)
- Time zone: UTC+07:00

South Central Coast and Central Highlands also known as South Central in short; is a region in southern part of Central Vietnam.

The word "coast" in the name refers to the eastern coastal plain. And "Central Highlands" refers to a region characterized by a plateau terrain in the west. The South Central Coast and Central Highlands, along with the North Central region, form Central Vietnam.

Prior to 2025, the South Central Coast and the Central Highlands were considered two separate regions. Following 2025 Vietnamese administrative reforms, the Central Highlands and South Central Coast provinces will be merged to form a unified South Central region.

The South Central Coast and Central Highlands region has an area of 99,690 km² and a population of 15.8 million people (2024).

== Geography ==
=== Geographical location ===
The South Central Coast and Central Highlands region is the southern part of Central Vietnam. It borders with Kingdom of Cambodia and Lao People's Democratic Republic to the west, North Central region to the north, East Sea to the east and Southeast region to the south.

The region has a very favorable geographical and economic location, situated on major road, rail, air, and sea transport routes, and close to the key economic triangle of the Southeast region.

=== Terrain ===
It has a complex geography with mountain ranges extending up to the coast, making transport and infrastructure development challenging but favouring tourism in some places, most notable around Phan Thiết, Nha Trang, and Da Nang. Tourism also benefits from Chams cultural heritage, including architecture, performances, and museums. It is generally much less industrialized and developed than the region around Ho Chi Minh City or the Red River Delta, but it has some regional industrial centers in Da Nang, around Nha Trang and Quy Nhơn.

In contrast to most other coastal regions in Vietnam, the east part of region's terrain is not mainly flat. It has a diverse topography with mountain ranges and hills extending not only along the entire border with Central Highlands but also to the coast, forming several passes, bays, peninsulas, and beautiful sceneries with beaches and mountain backdrops.

There are several rivers along the east part of region, the most significant being Thu Bồn River in Da Nang city and Đà Rằng River in Đắk Lắk province (most of the latter's river system is in the Central Highlands. Other major rivers include Trà Khúc River in Quảng Ngãi province, Côn River in Gia Lai province, Ki Lo River in Đắk Lắk province, Cái River and Dinh River in Khánh Hòa province.

In fact, the west part of region is not a single plateau but a series of adjacent plateaus. These include the Kon Tum (approximately 500 meters), Kon Plông, Kon Hà Nừng, Pleiku (approximately 800 meters), M'Drăk (approximately 500 meters), Buôn Ma Thuột (approximately 500 meters), Mơ Nông (approximately 800–1000 meters), Lâm Viên (approximately 1500 meters), Bảo Lộc and Di Linh plateaux (approximately 900–1000 meters).

The region can be divided into three sub-regions in terms of topography and climate, including the Northern-Central Highlands (corresponding to the western parts of Quảng Ngãi and Gia Lai provinces), Central-Central Highlands (corresponding to the western parts of Đắk Lắk and northeastern Lâm Đồng provinces) and Southern-Central Highlands (corresponding to the middle part of Lâm Đồng province). The Central Highlands have a lower altitude and higher temperatures than the northern and southern sub-regions.

With its characteristic basaltic red soil basaltic red soil at an altitude of about 500 to 600 meters above sea level, it are very suitable for industrial crops such as coffea, cocoa, black pepper, mulberry, etc. Cashew tree and rubber tree are also being grown here. Coffea is the most important industrial crop in the Central Highlands. The Central Highlands is also the second largest rubber tree region after the Southeast region and is currently exploiting bauxite ore. The Central Highlands in the west part is also a region in Vietnam with large areas of forest, diverse biodiversity, abundant mineral resources that are largely untapped, and great tourism potential. However, deforestation, destruction of natural resources, and indiscriminate logging have not been stopped here, potentially leading to forest depletion and changes in the environment and ecosystem.

== Climate ==
Located in the Tropical savanna climate, the climate in the region is divided into two seasons: the rainy season from May to the end of October and the dry season from November to April, with March and April being the two hottest and driest months. Due to the influence of altitude, while plateaus 400–500 m high have a relatively cool and rainy climate, plateaus above 1000 m have a cool climate year-round, a characteristic of high-altitude climates.

== Administration ==
Prior to 2025, the South Central Coast region was a separate locality from the Central Highlands, divided into 1 cities: Da Nang city and 7 provinces: Quảng Nam, Quảng Ngãi, Bình Định, Phú Yên, Khánh Hòa, Ninh Thuận, Bình Thuận. And Central Highlands divided into 5 provinces: Kon Tum, Gia Lai, Đắk Lắk, Đắk Nông, Lâm Đồng.

Currently, South Central Coast and Central Highlands region is divided into 1 centrally-governed city and 5 provinces:

Name	Capital	Area (km²)	Population (thousand people)	Density (people/km²)	Administration			Vehicle license plate
Name	Capital	Area (km²)	Population (thousand people)	Density (people/km²)	Ward	Commune	Special zone	Vehicle license plate
Da Nang	Hải Châu	11,859.59	2,819,9	237	23	70	1	43, 92
Quảng Ngãi	Cẩm Thành	14,832.55	1,861,7	125	9	86	1	76, 82
Gia Lai	Quy Nhơn	21,576.93	3,153,4	146	25	110	0	77, 81
Đắk Lắk	Buôn Ma Thuột	18,096.40	2,813,4	155	14	88	0	47, 78
Khánh Hòa	Nha Trang	8,555.86	1,882,0	220	16	48	1	79, 85
Lâm Đồng	Xuân Hương – Đà Lạt	24,233.07	3,324,4	137	20	103	1	48, 49, 86
Total		99,153.43	15,872,8	159	107	505	4	
