= South Central Coast =

Region of Vietnam

Coordinates: 15°41′49.51″N 108°25′26.66″E

South Central Coast Duyên hải Nam Trung Bộ
- Location of the South Central Region in Vietnam
- Country: Vietnam

Area
  - Total: 44,605.12 km^{2} (17,222.13 sq mi)

Population (2022)
  - Total: 9,470,840
  - Density: 212.326/km^{2} (549.923/sq mi)

GDP
  - Total: VND 530 trillion US$ 23.3 billion (2021)
- Time zone: UTC+7 (UTC +7)
- HDI (2022): 0.711 high · 3rd

In Vietnam, South Central Coast (Vietnamese: Duyên hải Nam Trung Bộ) and South Central Region (Vietnamese: Nam Trung Bộ) are two terms which can refer to the same region or two regions that do not correspond to each other. South Central Coast (sometimes called "South Central Region") consists of the independent municipality of Đà Nẵng and seven other provinces (picture 1), which means South Central Coast doesn't include Central Highlands (picture 2). Nevertheless, the term "South Central Region" can also be used to include Central Highlands as it is part of southern part of Central Vietnam.

The region has traditionally been one of the main gateways to neighbouring Central Highlands. It has a complex geography with mountain ranges extending up to the coast, making transport and infrastructure development challenging but favouring tourism in some places, most notable around Phan Thiết, Nha Trang, and Da Nang. Tourism also benefits from Cham cultural heritage, including architecture, performances, and museums. It is generally much less industrialized and developed than the region around Ho Chi Minh City or the Red River Delta, but it has some regional industrial centers in Da Nang, around Nha Trang and Quy Nhon.

South Central Coast (Duyên hải Nam Trung Bộ) - 8 provinces: Da Nang, Quảng Nam, Quảng Ngãi, Bình Định, Phú Yên, Khánh Hòa, Ninh Thuận and Bình Thuận. The two southern provinces Ninh Thuận and Bình Thuận are sometimes seen as part of the Southeast region. In the Nguyễn dynasty, this area was known as Tả Trực Kỳ (the area located in the right of Thừa Thiên).

== Provinces ==
Statistics of South Central Coastal Vietnam
Province	Capital	Area (km²)	Population (2025)	Population density (persons/km²)
Bình Định	Quy Nhon	6,066.40	1,813,101	299
Bình Thuận	Phan Thiết	7,942.60	1,531,253	193
Khánh Hòa	Nha Trang	5,200.11	1,477,711	284
Ninh Thuận	Phan Rang–Tháp Chàm	3,355.75	765,843	228
Phú Yên	Tuy Hòa	5,025.99	1,054,350	210
Quảng Nam	Tam Kỳ	10,574.86	1,747,147	165
Quảng Ngãi	Quảng Ngãi	5,155.25	1,532,488	297
Đà Nẵng	Hải Châu Urban District	1,284.73	1,318,481	1,026

== History ==
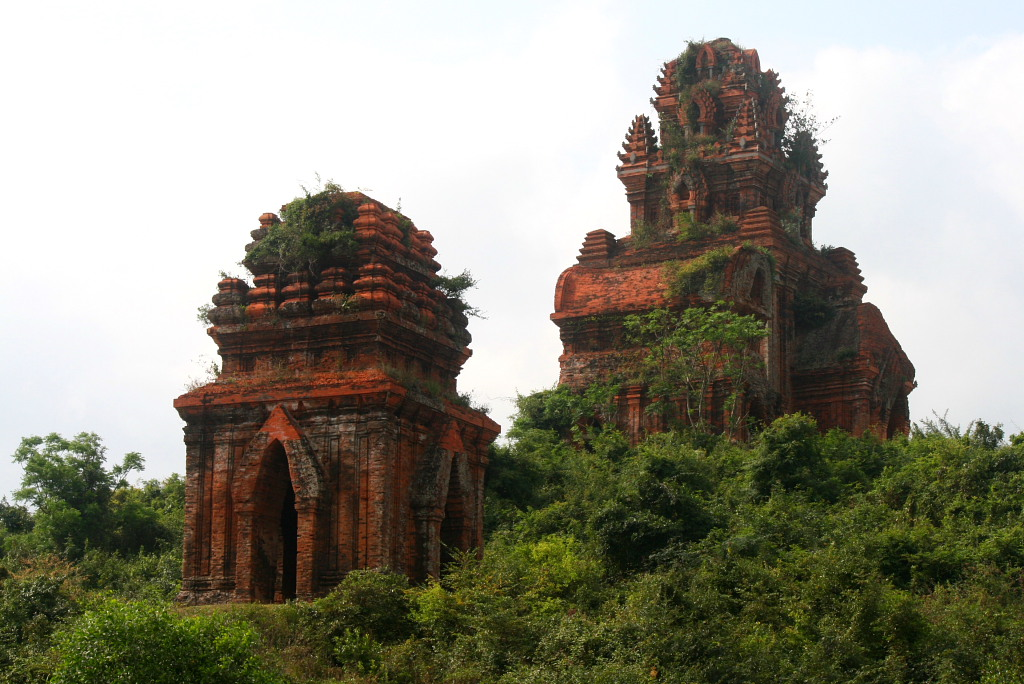
Banh It Towers, Bình Định province

The region was inhabited by people of the Sa Huỳnh culture between around 1000 BC and 200 AD. Remains of this ancient civilization were found in Sa Huỳnh, Quảng Ngãi province. It was succeeded by a kingdom called Lin-yi (林邑) by the Chinese or Lâm Ấp in Vietnamese that was in existence from 192 AD. Its political center was just north of the South Central Coast near Huế. Lin-yi was culturally influenced by India. According to Chinese sources, it repeatedly raided Jiaozhi (Vietnamese: Giao Chỉ), which was one factor that contributed to several wars between Jiaozhi and their Chinese colonizers against Lin-yi in the 3rd, 4th, and 5th centuries.

The historic territory of Champa roughly equals the South Central Coast region, although it has at times extended well into the North Central Coast and its influence also extended into the Central Highlands. Except for its first capital, all of Champa's political centers were located in the South Central Coast. Some of the earlier capitals, as well as the religious center of Mỹ Sơn and the port city of Hội An were located in the territory of present-day Quảng Nam province. Probably due to defeats in wars against Đại Việt the political center shifted further south to Vijaya in what is now Bình Định province. After the fall of Vijaya to Vietnam in 1471, Champa had to retreat to the southern principality of Panduranga (now at Phan Rang in Ninh Thuận province), while much of occupied Champa continued to exist as a sort of protectorate within Vietnam for some time. Relations with the mountainous hinterland and traders from overseas were crucial. Champa's trade specialized on procuring luxury goods such as eaglewood from the Central Highlands and even as far as Attapeu in southern Laos and selling them to foreign merchants through their ports at Hội An and Thi Nai.

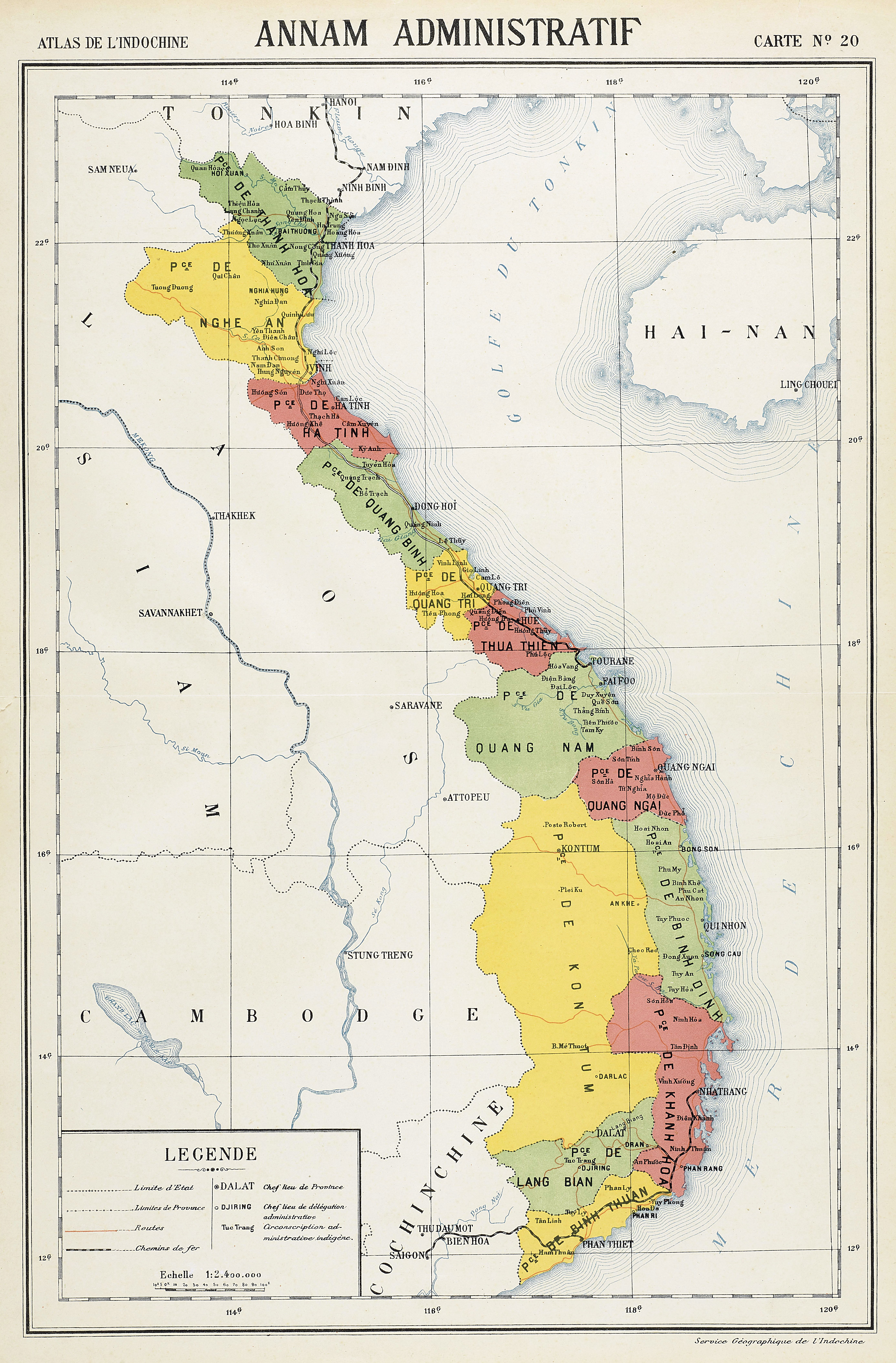
Administrative divisions of Annam 1920

Following the Treaty of Huế (1884), the South Central Coast as well as the North Central Coast became part of the Annam (French protectorate).

== Geography ==
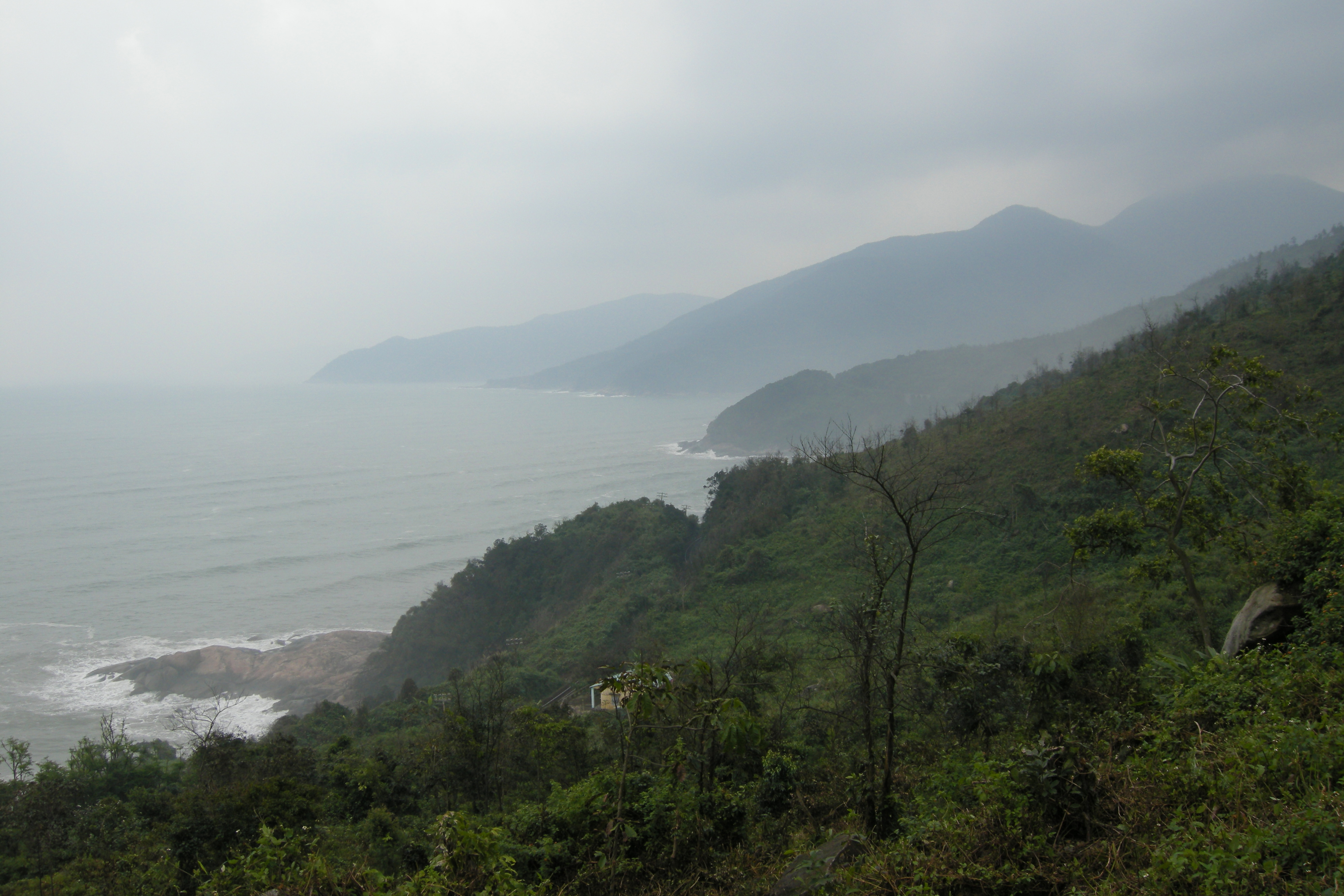
The coast of South China Sea near Hải Vân Pass

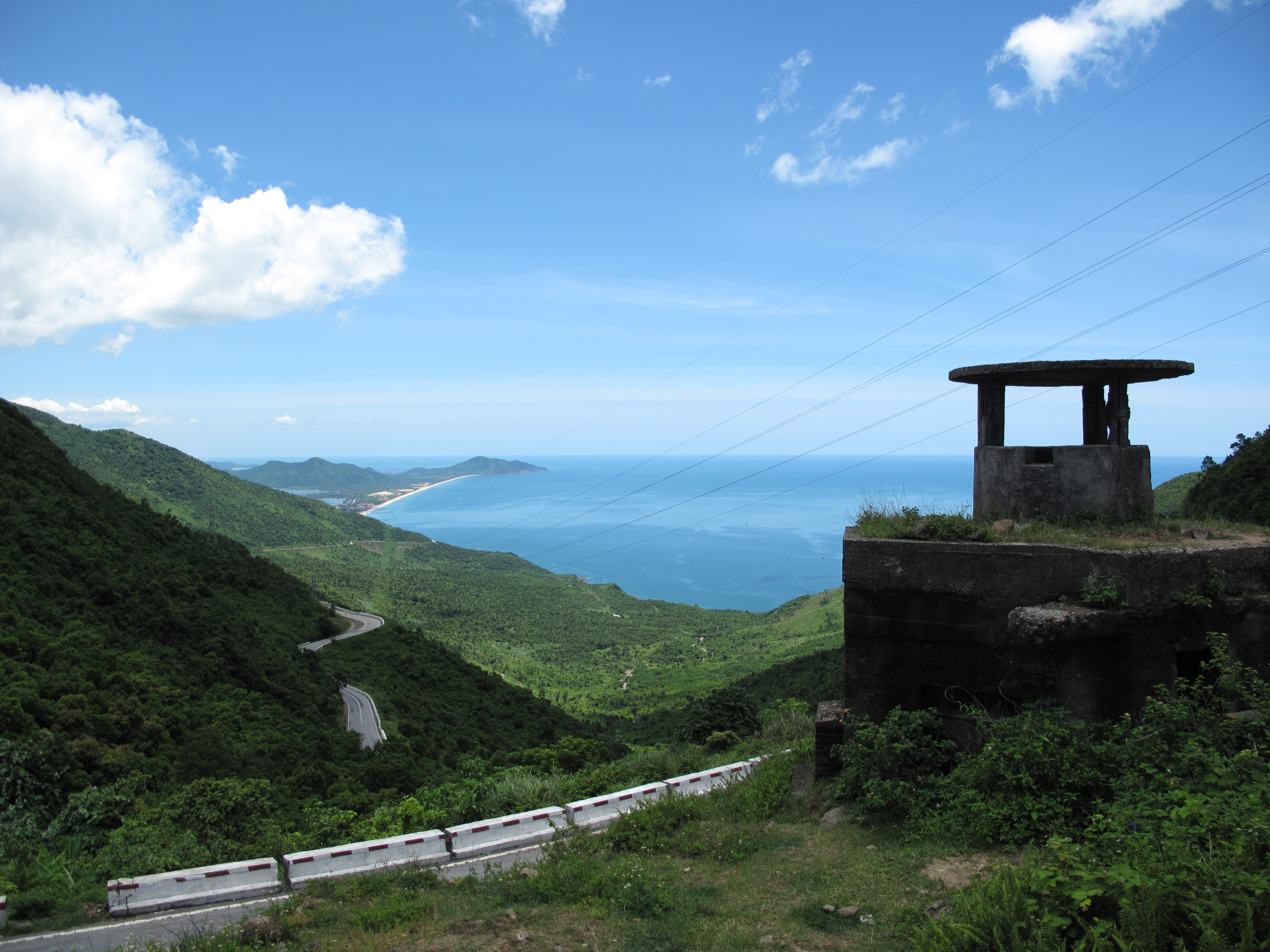
Hải Vân Pass

=== Topography ===
In contrast to most other coastal regions in Vietnam, the South Central Coast's terrain is not mainly flat. It has a diverse topography with mountain ranges and hills extending not only along the entire border with Central Highlands but also to the coast, forming several passes, bays, peninsulas, and beautiful sceneries with beaches and mountain backdrops. Many of the highest mountains are at or near the border with the Central Highlands, the highest of which is Ngọc Linh mountain at 2598 meters. There are several high peaks near the coast of Da Nang city (696m on Son Tra Peninsula), Bình Định province (up to 874m), Phú Yên province (up to 814m), Khánh Hòa province (up to 978m), and Ninh Thuận province (up to 1040m). Several mountain passes function as geographic borders between the provinces of the region, with one or two provinces between two major passes. Major passes include the Hải Vân Pass on the northern border of the region (Da Nang), Binh De pass (đèo Bình Đê) between Quảng Ngãi province and Bình Định province, Cù Mông pass (đèo Cù Mông) between Bình Định province and Phú Yên province and Cả pass (đèo Cả) between Phú Yên province and Khánh Hòa province.

The region includes several islands. Some of the larger ones are the Lý Sơn Islands, the Cham Islands, and Phú Quý island. The Paracel Islands and the Spratly Islands are officially administered by Da Nang City and Khánh Hòa Province. However, sovereignty over them is disputed and Vietnam actually controls only some of the Spratly Islands.

=== Hydrography ===
There are several rivers along the South Central Coast, the most significant being Thu Bồn River in Quảng Nam province and Đà Rằng River in Phú Yên province (most of the latter's river system is in the Central Highlands. Other major rivers include Trà Khúc River in Quảng Ngãi province, Côn River in Bình Định province, Ki Lo River in Phú Yên province, Cái River in Khánh Hòa province, and Dinh River in Ninh Thuận province.

=== Climate ===
Summer temperatures average above 28 °C (82 °F) along most of the coast with slightly lower temperatures further inland. Winters are significantly cooler with average temperatures ranging from around 20 to 25 °C (68 to 77 °F). The region includes some of the most arid (Ninh Thuận province and Bình Thuận province) as well as some of wettest climates in Vietnam (Da Nang, parts of Quảng Nam province, Quảng Ngãi province), with the rest being somewhere in between. While average precipitation per year exceeds 2,800 millimetres (110.2 in) in many parts of the three provinces in the north of the region, it is less than 800 millimetres (31.5 in) in much of Ninh Thuận province.

== Economy ==
=== Agriculture, forestry, fishing ===
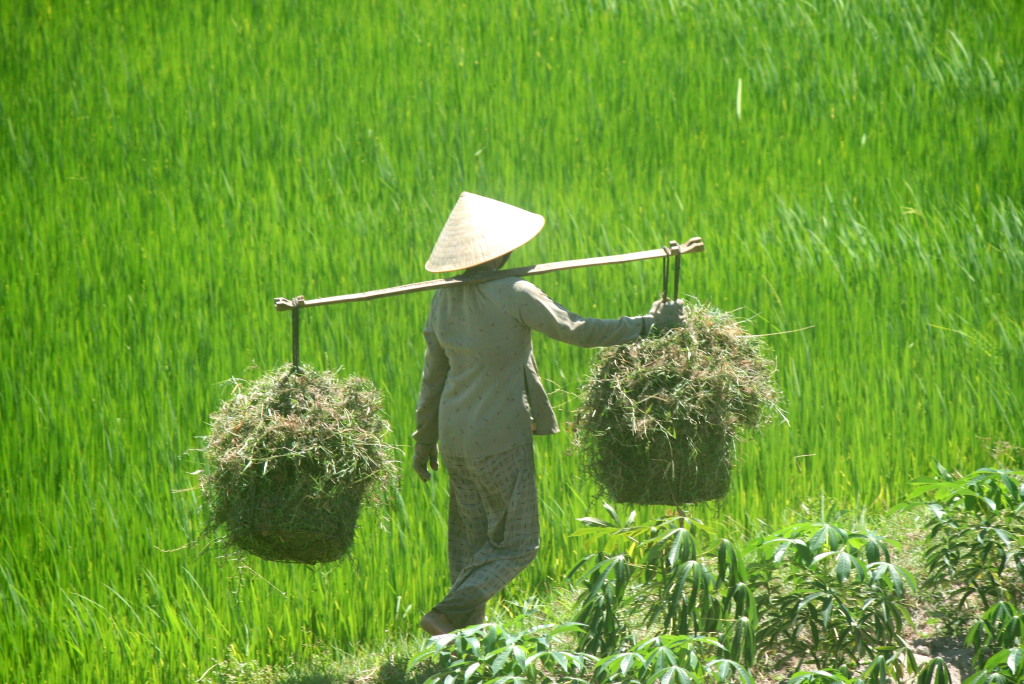
Farmer in Bình Định province

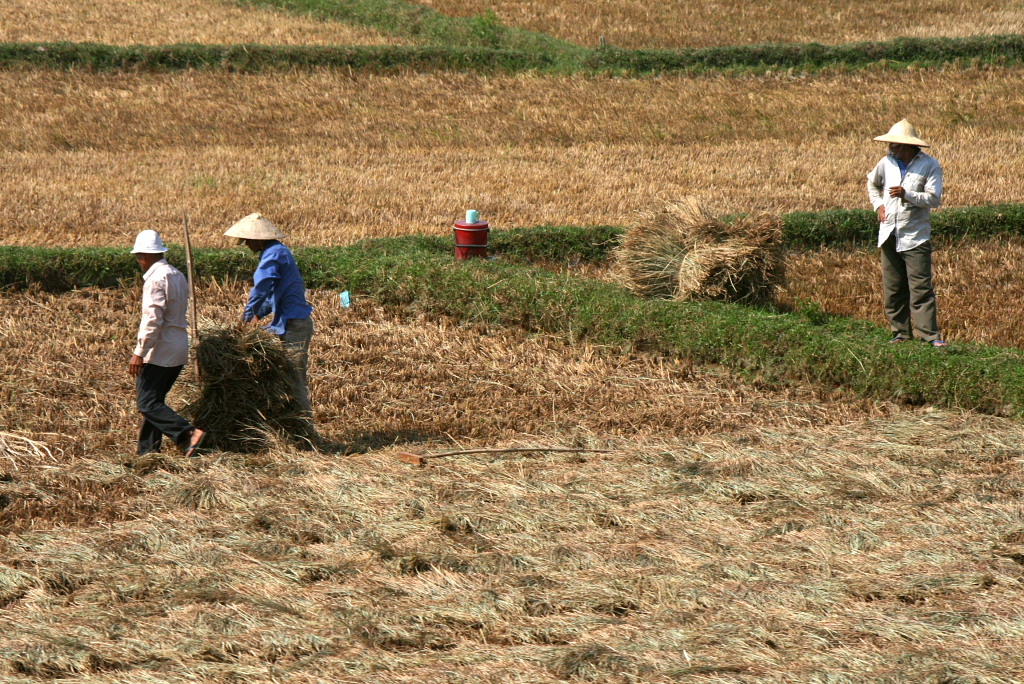
Farmers in Quảng Ngãi province

	in bn VND (2007)	% of national
Sector 1 GDP	22,557	9.7
Agriculture gross output	23,949.1	10.1
Forestry gross output	1325.1	12.35
Fishery gross output	12,410.8	14.21

The South Central Coast's sector 1 (agriculture, forestry, fishing) performance can be seen as average in the national context, with its GDP contribution similar to its population share (9.7% and 9.5%). Rice output is below average, but output of some other crops (see table below) as well as forestry and fishing are above average.

The province with the largest sector 1 economy is Bình Định (contributing 22.9% to the regions sector 1 GDP), due to its relatively large output in agriculture, forestry, and fishing. It is followed by Quảng Nam province with 15%, Bình Thuận province with 14.6%, Quảng Ngãi province and Khánh Hòa province with around 13% each. Forestry output is concentrated in Quảng Nam province and Bình Định province with around 25% each, with Quảng Ngãi province and Bình Thuận province contribute another 15% each, while Da Nang and especially Ninh Thuận province have very small forestry sectors. Fishing output is highest in Khánh Hòa province (22.3%) and Bình Định province (19.6%), followed by Phú Yên province and Quảng Ngãi province with around 12% each and Quảng Nam province, Bình Thuận province and Phú Yên province with 9 to 10% each.

2.52 million tons of rice were harvested in the South Central Coast in 2007, 7% of Vietnam's total rice harvest. The main producers are Bình Định (580kt in 2007), Bình Thuận (434kt), Quảng Nam (395kt), Quảng Ngãi (381kt), and Phú Yên (321kt). The region's maize harvest made up 7.5% of the nation's total.

	Output (2007)	% of national	Major producers
Cotton	3000 tons	18.63	Bình Thuận (2kt, 12.4%), Phú Yên (800t, 5%), Ninh Thuận (200t, 1.2%)
Tobacco	5000 tons	15.67	Ninh Thuận (3.3kt, 10.3%), Quảng Nam (900t, 2.8%), Phú Yên (700t, 2.2%)
Sugar-cane	2,643,600 tons	15.21	Phú Yên (1mt, 6%), Khánh Hòa (738kt, 4.25%), Quảng Ngãi (390kt, 2.25)
Coconuts	126,696 tons	12.1	Bình Định (95kt, 9%), Quảng Ngãi (13.7kt, 1.3%)
Cashew nuts	33,391 tons	11.06	Bình Thuận (17.5kt, 5,8%), Khánh Hòa (5.2kt, 1.74%), Bình Định (4.2kt, 1.4%)
Peanuts	51,900 tons	10.28	Quảng Nam (16.9kt, 3.35%), Bình Định (13.7kt, 2,71%), Quảng Ngãi (11.1kt, 2.2%), Bình Thuận (6.8kt, 1.35%)
Pepper	3445 tons	3.82	Bình Thuận (2.3kt, 2.6%)
Rubber	12,996 tons	2.16	Bình Thuận (12.3kt, 2%)

Some tea and coffee are also planted in the region, but their output is insignificant in the national context.

=== Industry ===
The South Central Coast is central Vietnam's most industrialized region, mostly due to major industrial centers such as Da Nang and Khánh Hòa province. However, industrialization in the region is still lagging behind the national average and is far behind Vietnam's two major industrial hubs around Ho Chi Minh City and Hanoi. The region's industrial GDP was 35,885.4 billion VND in 2007, accounting for 37.35% of the region's total GDP and 7.54% of Vietnam's industrial GDP. More than 40% of that is produced in Khánh Hòa province and Da Nang (21.8% and 20%) and another 13 to 14% each by Quảng Nam province and Bình Định province. Bình Thuận province has been able to increase its share to 12% with growth rates in industry averaging 21.6% from 2000 to 2007. Most other provinces have achieved growth between 15 and 20%, with slower growth only in the established industrial centers of Da Nang (14.8%) and Khánh Hòa province (13%). The region's average industrial growth rate was 16.3% per year from 2000 to 2007, making the main driving force of the economy.

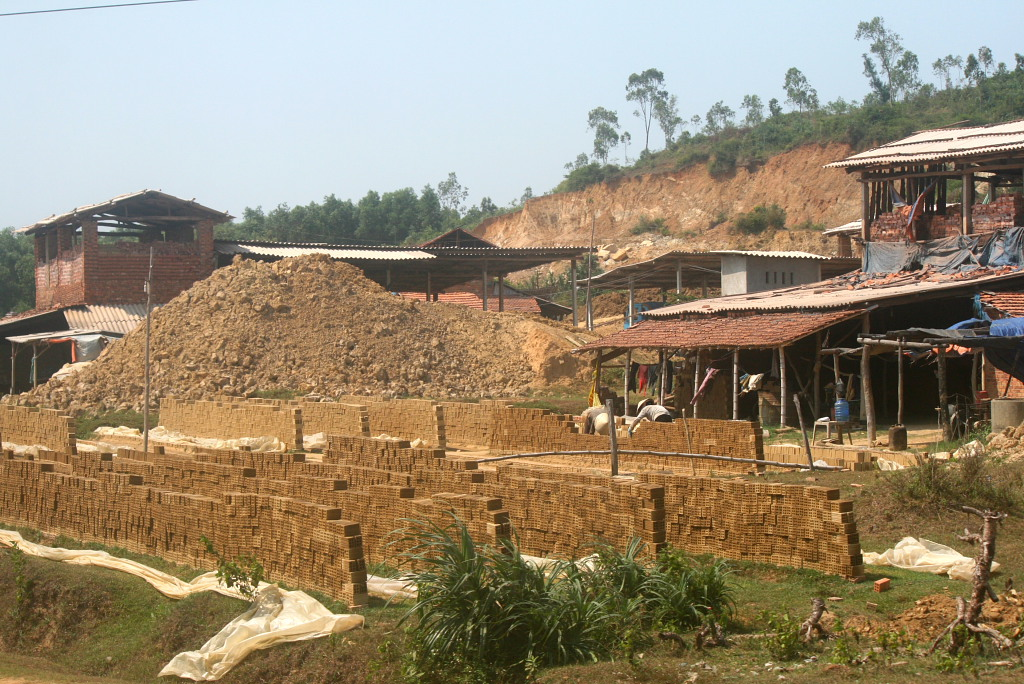
Rural brick factory in Quảng Ngãi province

Da Nang has a relatively diversified industrial sector including textiles, fabric, fertilizer, cement, soap, paper, pharmaceuticals etc. Khánh Hòa's industrial sector is still more reliant on basic industries such as food and seafood processing and beverages, shipbuilding, etc. The province also benefited significantly from investment related to the former Russian naval base at Cam Ranh, to which around 30 factories were attached. Quy Nhon is the region's third largest industrial center. It has been able to capitalize on its advantage as a gateway to the Central Highlands to develop resource-based industries (wood processing and stone processing) and a major furniture manufacturing cluster. Other industries are more dispersed, such as construction materials and basic food processing.

New industrial centers are currently being developed in the economic zones: Chu Lai Economic Zone in southern Quảng Nam, nearby Dung Quat Economic Zone (with Dung Quất Refinery) in northern Quảng Ngãi province, Nhơn Hội Economic Zone in Quy Nhon, and Van Phong Economic Zone in northern Khánh Hòa province. All four zones have large areas of land, major infrastructure and industrial projects. However, in contrast to the smaller industrial parks, they aren't limited to industrial sectors.

== Infrastructure ==
=== Transport ===
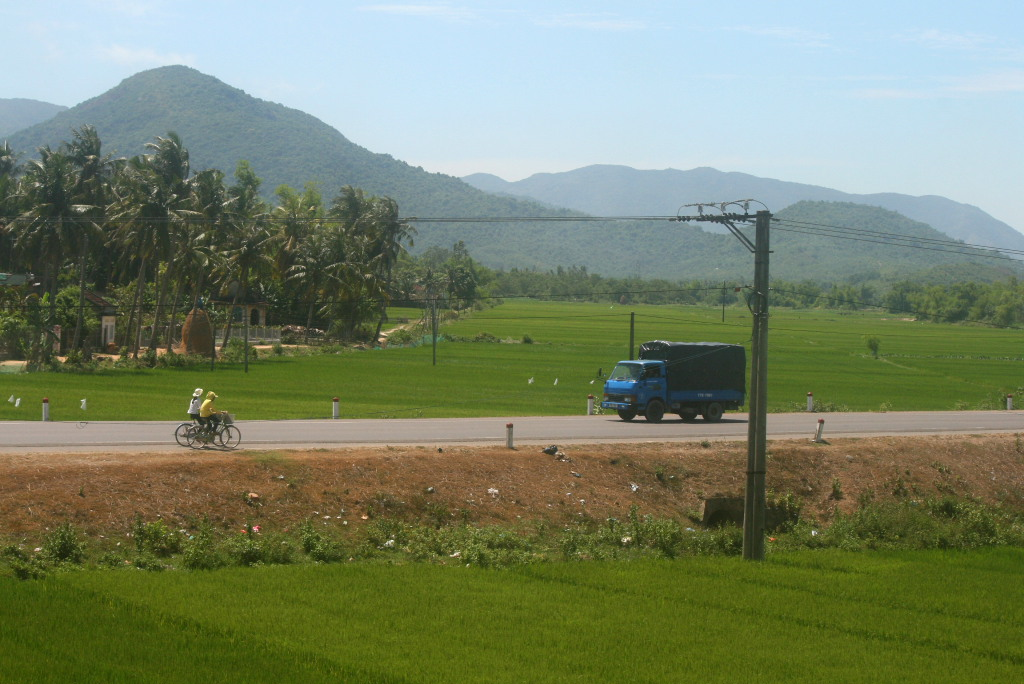
National Route 1 in Bình Định

Vietnam's main north-south transport corridors run through the whole South Central Coast region. The North–South Railway runs along the region, with Reunification Express stops at Đà Nẵng Railway Station, Diêu Trì Railway Station, and Nha Trang Railway Station. Stations with less frequent stops are Tam Kỳ Railway Station, Quảng Ngãi Railway Station, Quy Nhơn Railway Station, Tuy Hòa Railway Station, Tháp Chàm Railway Station, Mương Mán Railway Station, as well as several local railway stations. The two-lane National Route 1 connects all major cities of the region to the rest of the country (Quy Nhon and Nha Trang by extension 1D and 1C). The Ministry of Transport is planning the construction of a 139.5 km four-lane highway from Da Nang to Quảng Ngãi province in cooperation with foreign donors.

The region is connected to the Central Highlands by several national roads at Phan Rang (National Road 27 to Da Lat), Ninh Hòa, Khánh Hòa province (26 to Buôn Ma Thuột), Tuy Hòa (25 to Pleiku via Ayun Pa) Quy Nhon (19 to Pleiku), and western Quảng Nam province (14/ Ho Chi Minh Road to Kon Tum).

The largest airport in the region is Da Nang International Airport with flights to various cities in Vietnam, Singapore, Siem Reap, Guangzhou, Shanghai and seasonal flights to other cities in mainland China and Taiwan. The region's second international airport at Cam Ranh (serving Nha Trang flights to various cities in Vietnam, Guangzhou, Seoul, Kuala Lumpur, Hong Kong, Bangkok and Moscow etc.). Chu Lai Airport (serving Tam Kỳ and Quảng Ngãi), Phu Cat Airport (serving Quy Nhon) and Dong Tac Airport (serving Tuy Hòa) have only domestic flights.

Da Nang Port and Quy Nhơn Port are the region's major ports. Another major port is under construction at Vân Phong in Khánh Hòa province.

=== Energy ===
The South Central Coast has limited potential for hydro-power plants and has therefore not been a major part of EVN's mostly hydro-focused strategy. However, it is at the forefront of many of Vietnam's efforts to diversify electricity sources away from hydro-power. The country's first nuclear power plant is under construction in Ninh Thuận province. A second nuclear power project is being prepared with Japanese partners and will also be in Ninh Thuận.

A 200 MW wind power plant is under construction in Ninh Thuận province and is planned to be completed in 2012. Other wind power plants are being constructed in Bình Thuận province. Bình Thuận is also the location of a 1200 MW electro-thermal plant currently under construction.

== Demography ==
The South Central Coast region has a population of 8.93 million. The three northern provinces of Quảng Nam, Quảng Ngãi and Bình Định have the largest populations and together make up almost half of the region's population (47.7%).

2.82 million or 31.6% of them live in cities and towns. More than half of the region's urban population is in Da Nang, Khánh Hòa province and Bình Thuận province, while more than half of the rural population is in the provinces of Quảng Nam, Bình Định and Quảng Ngãi.

Annual population growth has averaged 1.22% from 2000 to 2007, with Da Nang recording the fastest population growth at 1.95%. Growth in the three northern provinces of Quảng Nam, Quảng Ngãi and Bình Định has been slowest at around 1%. The four other provinces had average growth rates between 1.26% (Khánh Hòa province) and 1.59% (Ninh Thuận province).

The region's population is ethnically clearly dominated by the Vietnamese people (Kinh). There are some minorities, the most significant of which are the Cham, the descendants of Champa. They live mostly in the lowlands around Phan Rang and northern Bình Thuận province, with smaller communities in other provinces such as southern Bình Định. Other minorities live mostly in the mountainous western parts of the region. Areas inhabited by minority people make up more than half of Quảng Nam province and Quảng Ngãi province.
