= National Route 25 (Vietnam) =

Road in Vietnam

National Route 25
- Quốc lộ 25

Route information
- Length: 181 km (112 mi)

Major junctions
- North end: QL 1 in Tuy Hòa Ward, Đắk Lắk province

- South end: QL 14 in Chư Sê, Gia Lai province

Location
- Country: Vietnam

Highway system
- Transport in Vietnam
← QL 24B	→ QL 26

National Route 25 or Highway 25 is a 180,810 kilometer long Vietnamese highway linking Phu Yen on the South Central coast to Gia Lai in the Central Highland. National Route 25 begins at the Hoa An commune, Phú Hòa district of Đắk Lắk province and ends at Chu Se town, Chư Sê district of Gia Lai province.

Highway 25 intersects with National Route 14.
