= Phú Yên =

- Ward
- Headquarters of the Phú Yên Ward People's Committee
- Interactive map of Phú Yên
- Coordinates: 13.051701924329647°N 109.31057335561802°E
- Country: Vietnam
- Region: South Central Coast and Central Highlands
- Province: Đắk Lắk
- Established: 16 June 2025
- Administrative headquarters: 199 Nguyễn Văn Linh Street

Area
  - Total: 44.04 km^{2} (17.00 sq mi)

Population (31 December 2024)
  - Total: 61,799
  - Density: 1,403/km^{2} (3,630/sq mi)
- Website: phuyen.daklak.gov.vn

Phú Yên is a coastal ward in Đắk Lắk province, Vietnam. The ward inherited its name from the former Phú Yên province.

On 16 June 2025:

- The operation of district-level administrative units throughout Vietnam was terminated from 1 July 2025.
- The entire area and population of Phú Đông, Phú Lâm, and Phú Thạnh wards, formerly part of Tuy Hòa city, Hòa Thành commune, part of the area and population of Hòa Hiệp Bắc ward, formerly part of Đông Hòa town, and the remaining area of Hòa Bình 1 commune, formerly part of Tây Hòa district, all in the former Phú Yên province, were merged to form a new ward named Phú Yên.
