= Ô Loan Lagoon =

Đầm Ô Loan
- Ô Loan Lagoon
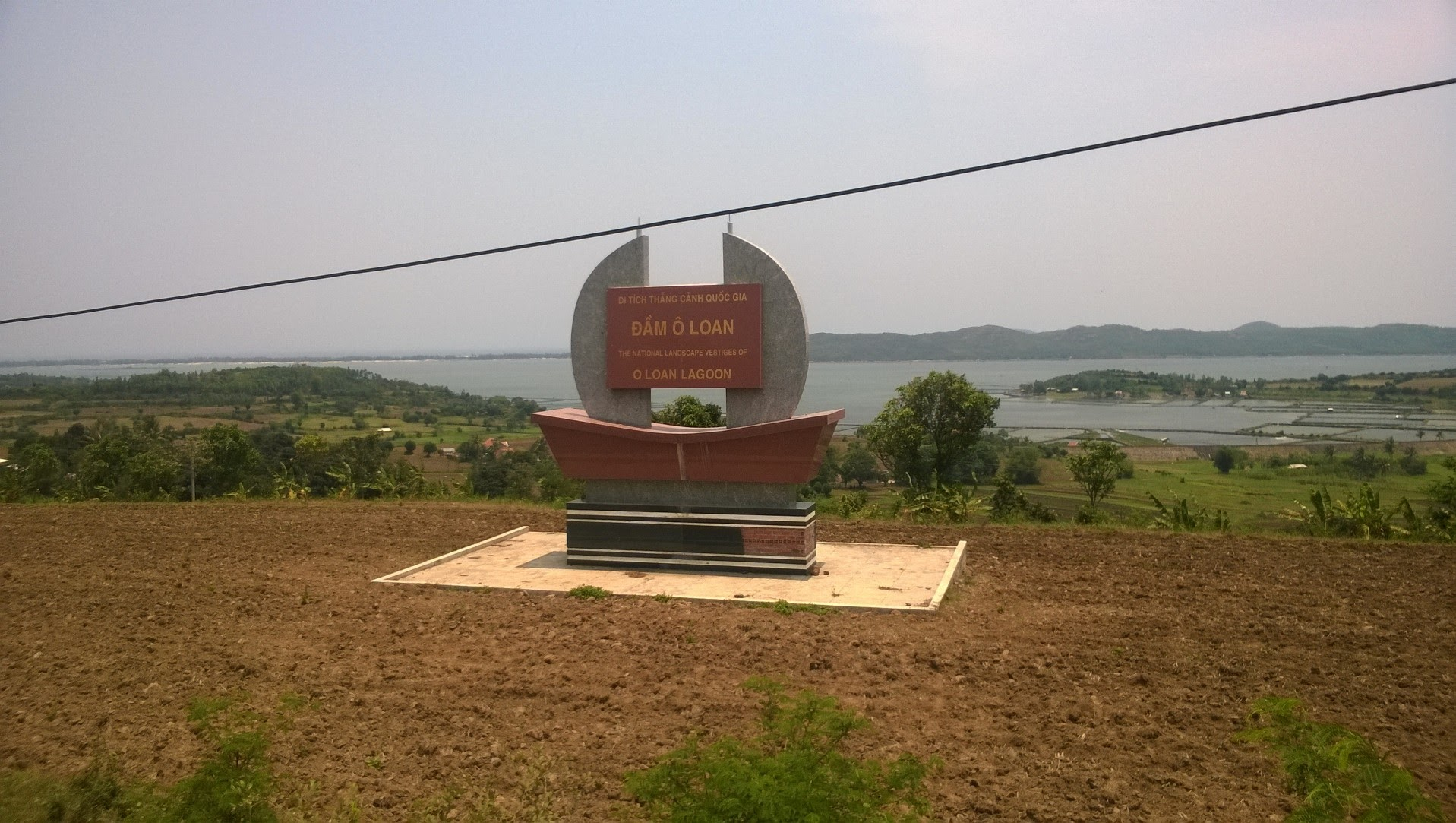
- Interactive map of Đầm Ô Loan
- Location: Đắk Lắk Province
- Coordinates: 13°16′14″N 109°16′36″E
- Type: Coastal lagoon
- Basin countries: Vietnam
- Surface area: 1.570 ha (3.88 acres)

Ô Loan Lagoon (Vietnamese: Đầm Ô Loan) is a brackish water lagoon located in Đắk Lắk Province, Vietnam. Covering an area of about 15.7 km², the lagoon lies around 22 kilometers north of Tuy Hoà. It is separated from the South China Sea by a narrow sand dune. There is a small creek connecting the lagoon to the sea.

The lagoon has been recognized as a National Scenic Site of Vietnam. Ô Loan Lagoon is also known for its abundance of seafood, particularly blood cockles, which are considered a local delicacy.

== Legend of the name ==
According to local legend, long ago, there was a beautiful fairy named Loan who loved to wander and explore. One day, she borrowed a ô thước bird (a mythical black bird believed to be a crow or magpie) to fly down to earth for sightseeing. Captivated by the beauty of the world, she didn’t notice that the bird had grown tired. When they flew over the lagoon in Tuy An district, the bird could no longer continue and fell down. Later, people combined the bird’s name with the fairy’s name to create the name Ô Loan Lagoon.

== Ecology ==
The lagoon hosts a rich ecosystem of brackish water species, including shrimp, crab, fish, and blood cockles. The mangrove vegetation around the lagoon provides a natural habitat for many birds and aquatic organisms, contributing to the ecological balance of the coastal area. Therefore, Ô Loan Lagoon was recognized as a national scenic site on September 27, 1996.

== Tourism ==
Ô Loan Lagoon is a well-known tourist destination in the former Phú Yên Province, especially after being featured in the Vietnamese film “Tôi thấy hoa vàng trên cỏ xanh” (Yellow Flowers on the Green Grass). Visitors often come here to enjoy the scenery and savor fresh seafood.

== See also ==
- Ganh Da Dia
