= Cycas elongata =

Conservation status
- Endangered (IUCN 3.1)

Scientific classification
- Kingdom: Plantae
- Clade: Tracheophytes
- Clade: Gymnospermae
- Division: Cycadophyta
- Class: Cycadopsida
- Order: Cycadales
- Family: Cycadaceae
- Genus: Cycas
- Species: C. elongata

Binomial name
- Cycas elongata (Leandri) D.Y.Wang

Synonyms
- Cycas pectinata var. elongata Leandri; Epicycas elongata (Leandri) S.L.Yang ex de Laub.

Species of cycad

Cycas elongata is a species of cycad in the family Cycadaceae. It is endemic to southern Vietnam.

== Distribution ==
The four main subpopulations of Cycas elongata are found in:

- northern Ninh Thuan Province
- west of Cam Ranh in Khanh Hoa Province
- Song Cau in Phu Yen Province
- the Cu Mong Pass area on the boundary between Phu Yen Province and Binh Dinh Province
- Lạc Nghiệp hamlet, Cà Ná commune, Thuận Nam District, Ninh Thuận Province (southwest of Phan Rang; found in 1994)
