= Sông Hinh (disambiguation) =

Sông Hinh is a commune in Đắk Lắk province, Vietnam.

Sông Hinh may also refer to:

- Hinh River, a tributary of the Ba River flowing through Đắk Lắk province in Central Vietnam
- Sông Hinh district, Phú Yên province
