= Mằng Lăng Church =

Church in Phú Yên province, Vietnam

- Nhà thờ Mằng Lăng
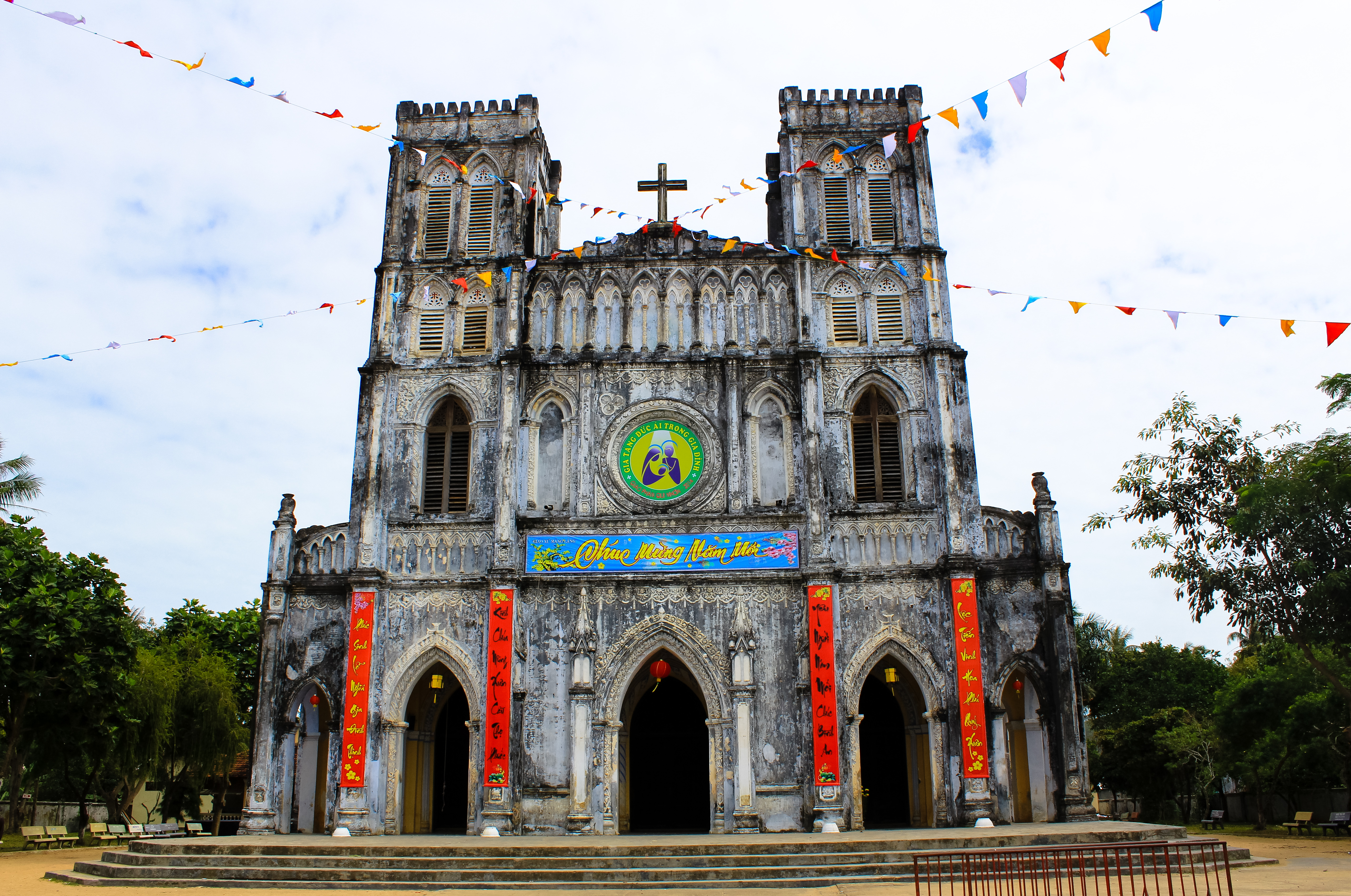
- Mằng Lăng Church

- Location within Vietnam
- 13°20′03″N 109°13′33″E
- Location: An Thạch, Tuy An District, Phú Yên Province, Vietnam
- Country: Vietnam
- Denomination: Roman Catholic

History
- Status: Active

Mang Lang Church (Vietnamese: Nhà thờ Mằng Lăng; French: Église de Mằng Lăng) is a Roman Catholic church in Vietnam, Phú Yên Province, 35 km from Tuy Hòa.

The church was built in 1892 by French missionary Father Joseph Lacassagne in gothic style. This place was the native village of blessed Andrew of Phu Yen beheaded in 1644. It is now an important shrine, as Andrew was declared Patron of the youth.

Alexander de Rhodes wrote here his Cathechismus in octo dies in Latin and Vietnamese (Quốc ngữ) and printed it in 1651.

== History ==
The site's historical roots trace to the 15th century during the Lê dynasty, with border establishments in Phú Yên documented in 1475. Early Christian influences emerged in the 17th century, including the baptism of Princess Ngọc Liên (Maria Mađalêna) in 1636, who established a chapel in the area. Missionary Alexandre de Rhodes composed his catechism, Phép giảng tám ngày (Cathechismus in octo dies), at this location, which was printed in Rome in 1651, marking the first use of quốc ngữ in print.

The current structure was built in 1892 under the direction of French missionary Father Joseph de La Cassagne (known locally as Cố Xuân), the first parish priest. It lies approximately 35 km north of Tuy Hòa city, near the Kỳ Lộ River. The church is part of the Mằng Lăng parish within the Roman Catholic Diocese of Quy Nhơn.

== Architecture ==
Spanning over 5,000 square meters, the church exemplifies Gothic architecture with ornate patterns and a simple grayish-green exterior that harmonizes with the surrounding landscape. It features two bell towers flanking a central cross. The courtyard includes a man-made hill with an underground bunker containing stone carvings depicting the life of Blessed Andrew of Phú Yên. The name "Mằng Lăng" derives from a local tree species once prevalent in the area.

== Significance ==
Mằng Lăng Church is the birthplace of Blessed Andrew of Phú Yên, martyred in 1644 and declared the patron saint of Vietnamese Catholic youth in 2000. It functions as a pilgrimage center for youth and hosts commemorative masses. The preserved copy of Phép giảng tám ngày is displayed in a glass case within the bunker, recognized as a national record for the oldest quốc ngữ book in Vietnam. The site attracts tourists for its historical and architectural value.
