= Ba River (Vietnam) =

River in Phú Yên province, Vietnam

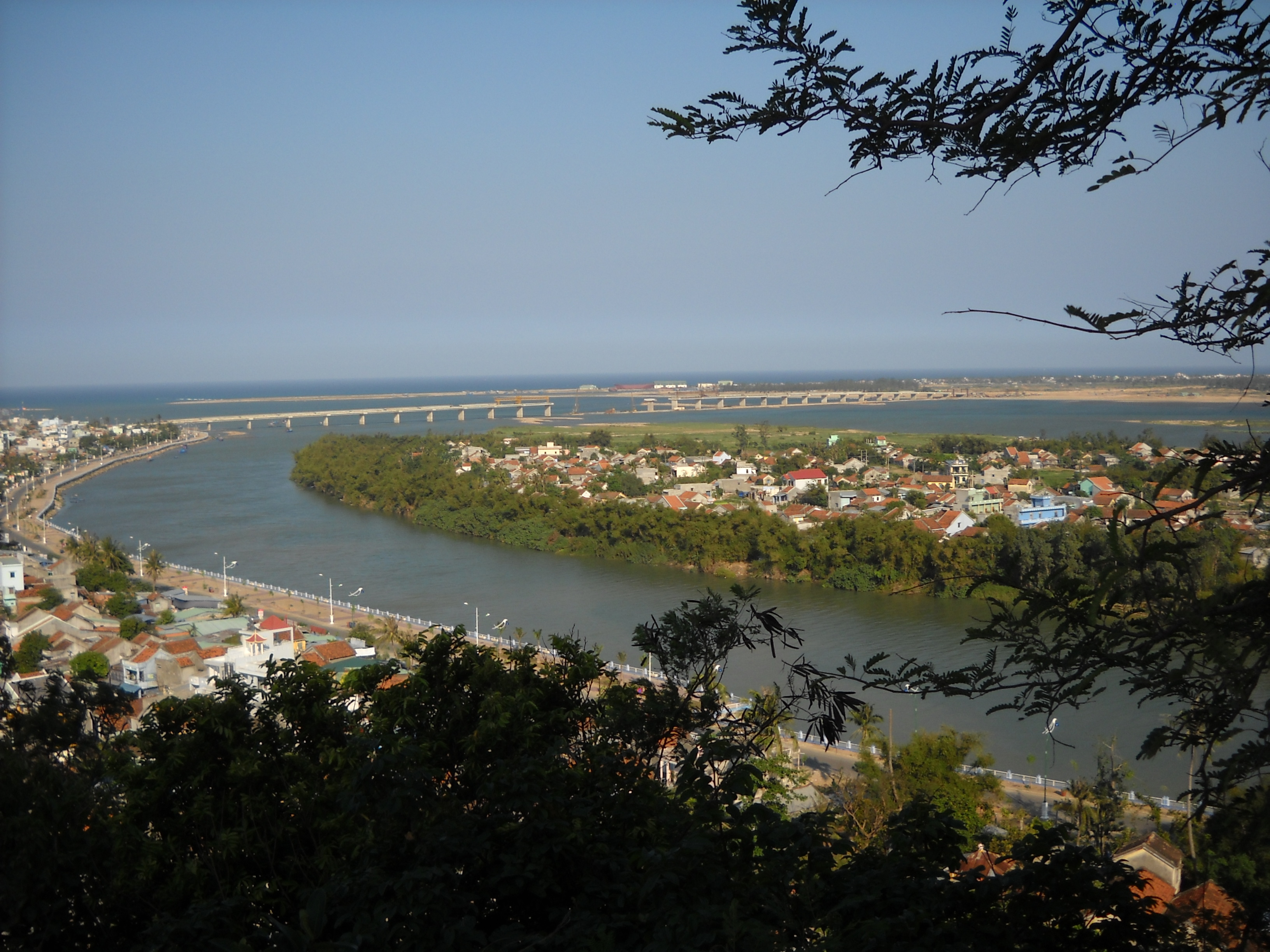
- Ba River flows through the city of Tuy Hòa, Phú Yên province

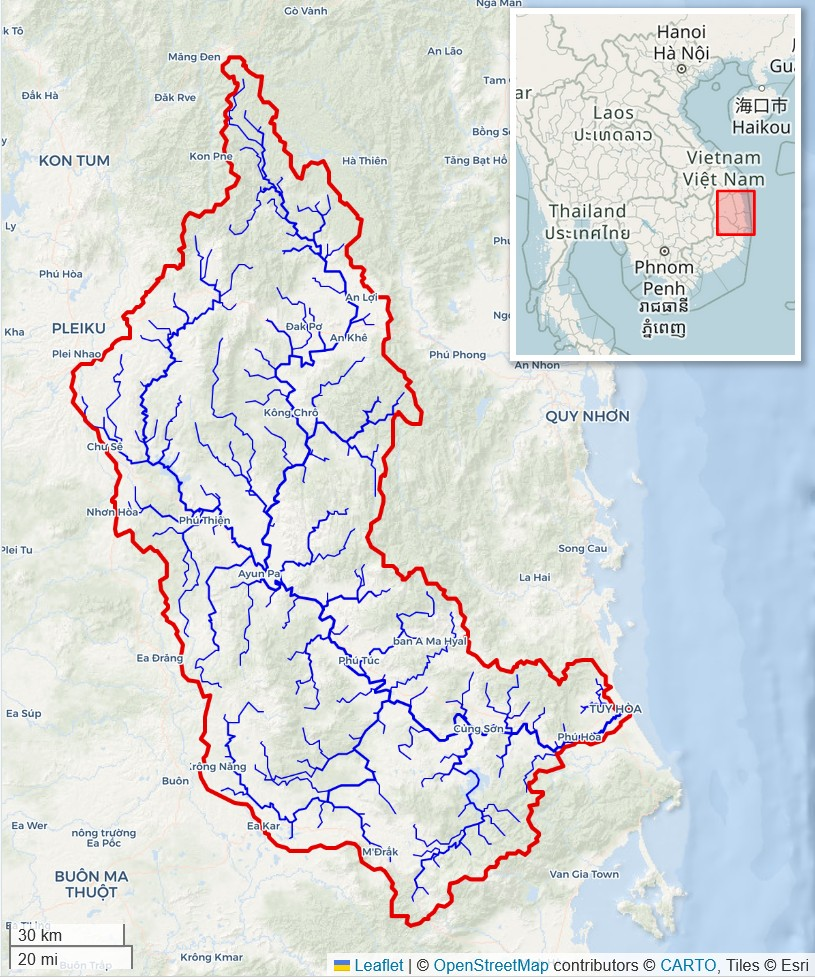
- Ba River Basin (Interactive map)
- Native name: Sông Ba (Vietnamese)

Location
- Country: Vietnam
- Province: Kon Tum; Gia Lai; Đắk Lắk; Phú Yên

Physical characteristics
- Source: Ngọc Rô mountain range
  - location: Kon Tum
  - elevation: 1549
- Mouth: Đà Diễn Gate
  - location: Tuy Hòa City
  - coordinates: 13°05′15″N 109°19′41″E
  - elevation: 0 m
- Length: 388 km (241 mi)
- Basin size: 13,900 km^{2} (5,400 sq mi)
- Discharge
  - average: 302 m^{3}/s (10,700 cu ft/s)
  - minimum: 45 m^{3}/s (1,600 cu ft/s)
  - maximum: 935 m^{3}/s (33,000 cu ft/s)

Basin features
- River system: Đà Rằng River in Đức Bình Tây commune, Sông Hinh River, Phú Yên province
- Tributaries
  - right: Ayun River; Krông Năng River; Hinh River

Ba River (Vietnamese: Sông Ba, also known as Ea Pa, Ia Pa, Krông Pa or Đà Rằng River) is a river in the South Central Coast region of Vietnam. It has its source in Kon Tum Province and flows into the South China Sea in Tuy Hòa, Phú Yên Province. It has the largest river valley area in central Vietnam and one of the largest river systems in central Vietnam with a total basin area of 13,900 km² or 4.19% of Vietnam's total area. It has a total length of 374 km.

== Geography ==
Ba River's basin area makes up southern Phú Yên province, parts of Đắk Lắk province, around half of Gia Lai province and parts of Kon Tum province and therefore, much of the eastern part of the Central Highlands. Tributaries include Hinh River and Ayun River, among many others.

The river's water volume varies significantly throughout the year, with only 47 and 45 m3/s in March and April and 366, 682, and 935 m3/s in September, October, and November.

== History ==
Remains from different periods have been found along Ba River. They include a Sanskrit inscription from the fifth century at its mouth and various Champa sites, including the citadel Thanh Ho around 15 km inland. The river certainly provided an important route far into the interior for the Cham people, who were involved in trade with both their highland hinterlands and seagoing merchants.
