= Sơn Hòa =

- Commune
- Interactive map of Sơn Hòa
- Coordinates: 13.051381114346087°N 108.97539162497571°E
- Country: Vietnam
- Region: South Central Coast and Central Highlands
- Province: Đắk Lắk
- Established: 16 June 2025

Area
  - Total: 267.39 km^{2} (103.24 sq mi)

Population (2025)
  - Total: 40,825
  - Density: 152/km^{2} (390/sq mi)

Sơn Hòa is a commune in Đắk Lắk province, Vietnam.

On 16 June 2025:

- District-level administrative units throughout Vietnam ceased operations from 1 July 2025.
- The entire area and population of Củng Sơn township and Suối Bạc, Sơn Hà, Sơn Nguyên, and Sơn Phước communes, formerly part of Sơn Hòa district, Phú Yên province, were merged to form a new commune named Sơn Hòa.
