= Đông Hòa =

Đông Hòa may refer to several places in Vietnam:

- Đông Hòa, Ho Chi Minh City: a ward in the former Dĩ An city
- Đông Hòa, Đắk Lắk: a ward in the former Đông Hòa town
- Đông Hòa, An Giang: a commune in the former An Minh district
- Đông Hòa, Phú Yên: a former district-level town, dissolved in 2025 as part of the 2025 Vietnamese administrative reform

== See also ==
- Đồng Hóa (disambiguation)
