= Sông Cầu (town) =

Coordinates: 13°33′N 109°12′E

- District-level town (Class-4)
- Sông Cầu Town; Thị xã Sông Cầu
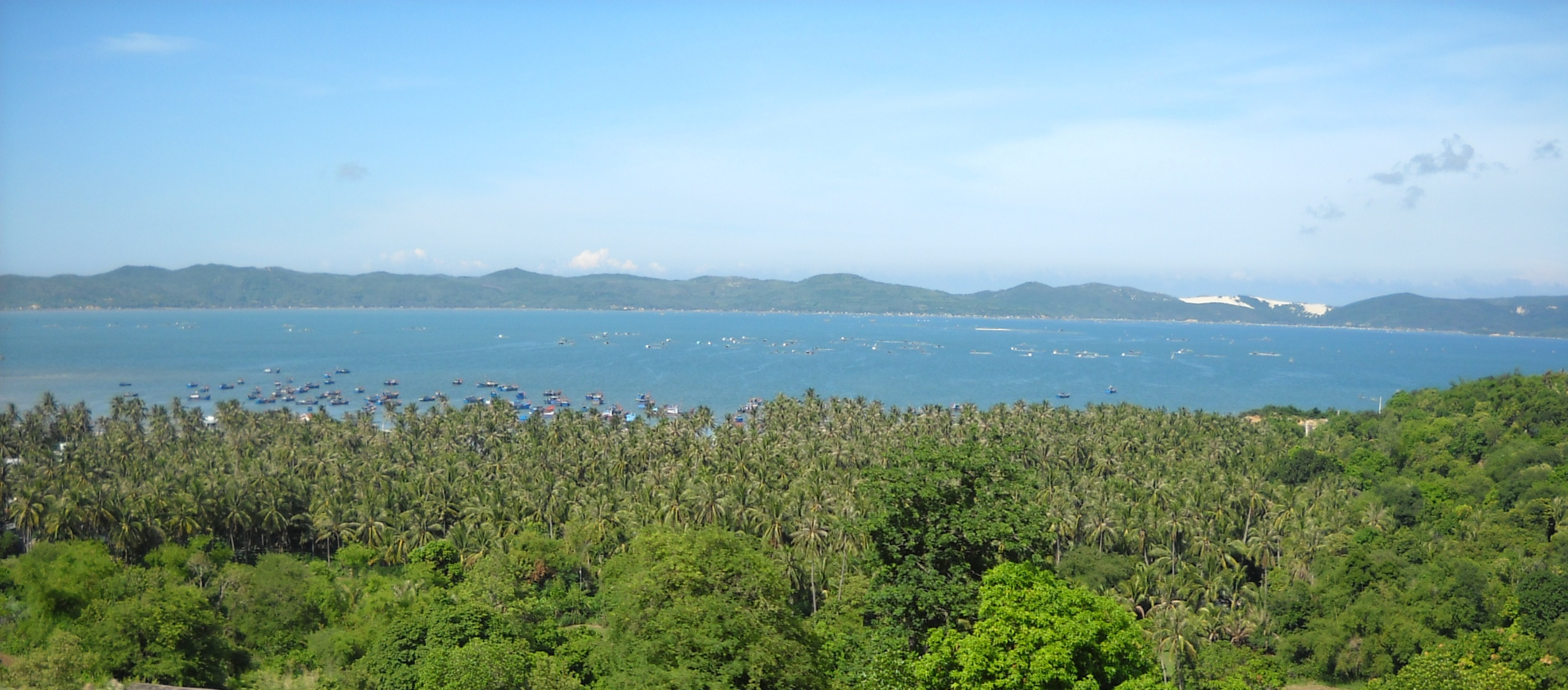
- Xuân Đài Bay

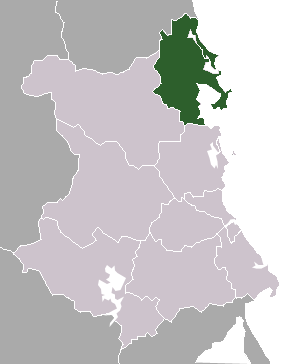
- Location of Sông Cầu in Phú Yên Province

- Location within Vietnam Location within Southeast Asia Location within Asia
- Country: Vietnam
- Region: South Central Coast
- Province: Phú Yên
- Established: 28 August 2009
- Local government's offices: Xuân Phú

Area
  - District-level town (Class-4): 188 sq mi (487 km^{2})
  - Urban: 12.4266 sq mi (32.1848 km^{2})

Population (2009)
  - District-level town (Class-4): 105,780
  - Density: 541/sq mi (208.7/km^{2})
  - Urban: 32,437
  - Urban density: 2,610/sq mi (1,007.8/km^{2})
- Time zone: UTC+7 (Indochina Time)
- Website: songcau.phuyen.gov.vn

Sông Cầu is a former town (thị xã) of Phú Yên province in the South Central Coast region of Vietnam.

After the Vietnam War, Sông Cầu was merged into Đồng Xuân District in 1976. The latter was then combined with Tuy An District to become Xuân An District in March 1977, but Xuân An was soon split again into the two previous districts in September 1978. Sông Cầu Township was the seat for those districts. On 27 June 1985, Sông Cầu District was split from Đồng Xuân District. On 28 August 2009, Sông Cầu District was upgraded to town status.

Sông Cầu is subdivided into 4 wards (phường): Xuân Yên, Xuân Phú, Xuân Thành and Xuân Đài, and 10 communes (xã): Xuân Thọ 1, Xuân Thọ 2, Xuân Lâm, Xuân Phương, Xuân Thịnh, Xuân Cảnh, Xuân Hoà, Xuân Bình, Xuân Lộc and Xuân Hải. At the time of establishment (2009) it had a population of 101,521 and covered an area of 489.28 km^{2} (188.91 sq mi). The local government's offices are located in Xuân Phú Ward.
