= Sông Hinh =

- Commune
- Interactive map of Sông Hinh
- Coordinates: 12°49′5″N 108°59′54″E
- Country: Vietnam
- Region: South Central Coast and Central Highlands
- Province: Đắk Lắk
- Established: 16 June 2025

Area
  - Total: 460.13 km^{2} (177.66 sq mi)

Population (2025)
  - Total: 23,841
  - Density: 51/km^{2} (130/sq mi)

Sông Hinh is a commune in Đắk Lắk province, Vietnam.

On 16 June 2025:

- District-level administrative units throughout Vietnam ceased operations from 1 July 2025.
- The entire area and population of Hai Riêng township, Ea Trol Commune, Sông Hinh Commune, and the remaining area of Ea Bia Commune, formerly part of Sông Hinh district, Phú Yên province, were merged to form a new commune named Sông Hinh.
