= Hòa Mỹ (disambiguation) =

Hòa Mỹ may refer to several places in Vietnam, including:

- Hòa Mỹ, a commune of Đắk Lắk province
- Hòa Mỹ, Cà Mau, a former rural commune of Cái Nước district
- Hòa Mỹ, Hậu Giang, a former rural commune of Phụng Hiệp district
