= Hòa Mỹ =

- Commune
- Phú Nhiêu Market
- Interactive map of Hòa Mỹ
- Coordinates: 12.965022385996885°N 109.21512724247413°E
- Country: Vietnam
- Region: South Central Coast and Central Highlands
- Province: Đắk Lắk
- Established: 2025

Area
  - Total: 190.14 km^{2} (73.41 sq mi)

Population (31 December 2024)
  - Total: 26,530
  - Density: 139/km^{2} (360/sq mi)

Hòa Mỹ is a commune in Đắk Lắk province, Vietnam.

On 16 June 2025:

- District-level administrative units throughout Vietnam ceased operations from 1 July 2025.
- The entire area and population of Hòa Mỹ Đông and Hòa Mỹ Tây communes, formerly part of Tây Hòa district, Phú Yên province, were merged to form a new commune named Hòa Mỹ.
