= Ayaru =

Ayaru may refer to:

- a month in the Babylonian calendar
- an old name for what is now Phú Yên province in Vietnam
