= Cyrtodactylus kingsadai =

Conservation status
- Least Concern (IUCN 3.1)

Scientific classification
- Kingdom: Animalia
- Phylum: Chordata
- Class: Reptilia
- Order: Squamata
- Suborder: Gekkota
- Family: Gekkonidae
- Genus: Cyrtodactylus
- Species: C. kingsadai

Binomial name
- Cyrtodactylus kingsadai Ziegler, Phung, M. Le & T. Nguyen, 2013

Species of lizard

Cyrtodactylus kingsadai is a species of gecko, a lizard in the family Gekkonidae. The species is endemic to Vietnam.

== Etymology ==
The specific name, kingsadai, is in honor of Laotian herpetologist Phouthone Kingsada (died 2012).

== Geographic range ==
C. kingsadai is found in southern Vietnam, in Phu Yen Province.

== Habitat ==
The preferred natural habitat of C. kingsadai is shrubland, at altitudes of 50–100 m (160–330 ft).

== Description ==
Medium-sized for its genus, C. kingsadai may attain a snout-to-vent length of 9.4 cm (3.7 in).

== Reproduction ==
The mode of reproduction of C. kingsadai is unknown.
