= Krông Năng River =

River in Vietnam

- Location within Vietnam
- Native name: Sông Krông Năng (Vietnamese)

Location
- Country: Vietnam
- Province: Đắk Lắk Đắk Lắk, Gia Lai province và Phú Yên province
- Region: Central Highlands

Physical characteristics
- Length: 134 km (83 mi)
- Basin size: 1.753 km²

The Krông Năng River (Vietnamese: Sông Krông Năng) is a river of Vietnam. It flows through Đắk Lắk Province for 130 kilometres.
