= Cả Pass =

Mountain pass in Vietnam

Coordinates: 12.871059°N 109.399146°E

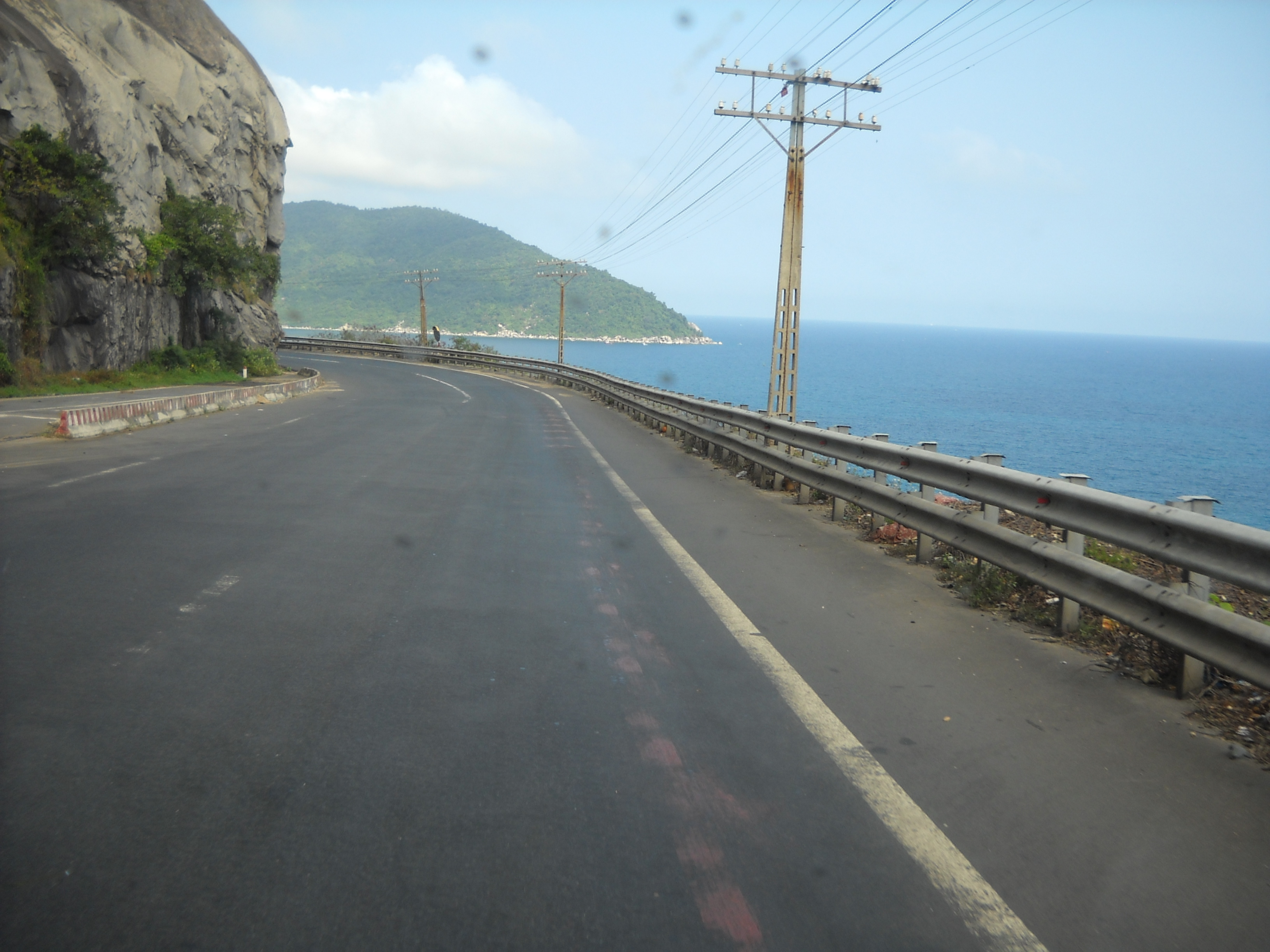
Stretch of road along the Cả Pass cliff edge

The Cả pass (Đèo Cả) is a mountain pass in Phú Yên Province, Vietnam. The mountains are known as the Cả pass mountains (núi Cả Đèo). Historically, the Cả Pass was the second most difficult col in Vietnam after Hải Vân Pass. In 1611, the Nguyen lords pushed their border down to Cả Pass.

The pass is also known as Đèo Cục Kịch. In the French documents the pass name is "Col Babonneau".
