= Sông Cầu =

- Ward
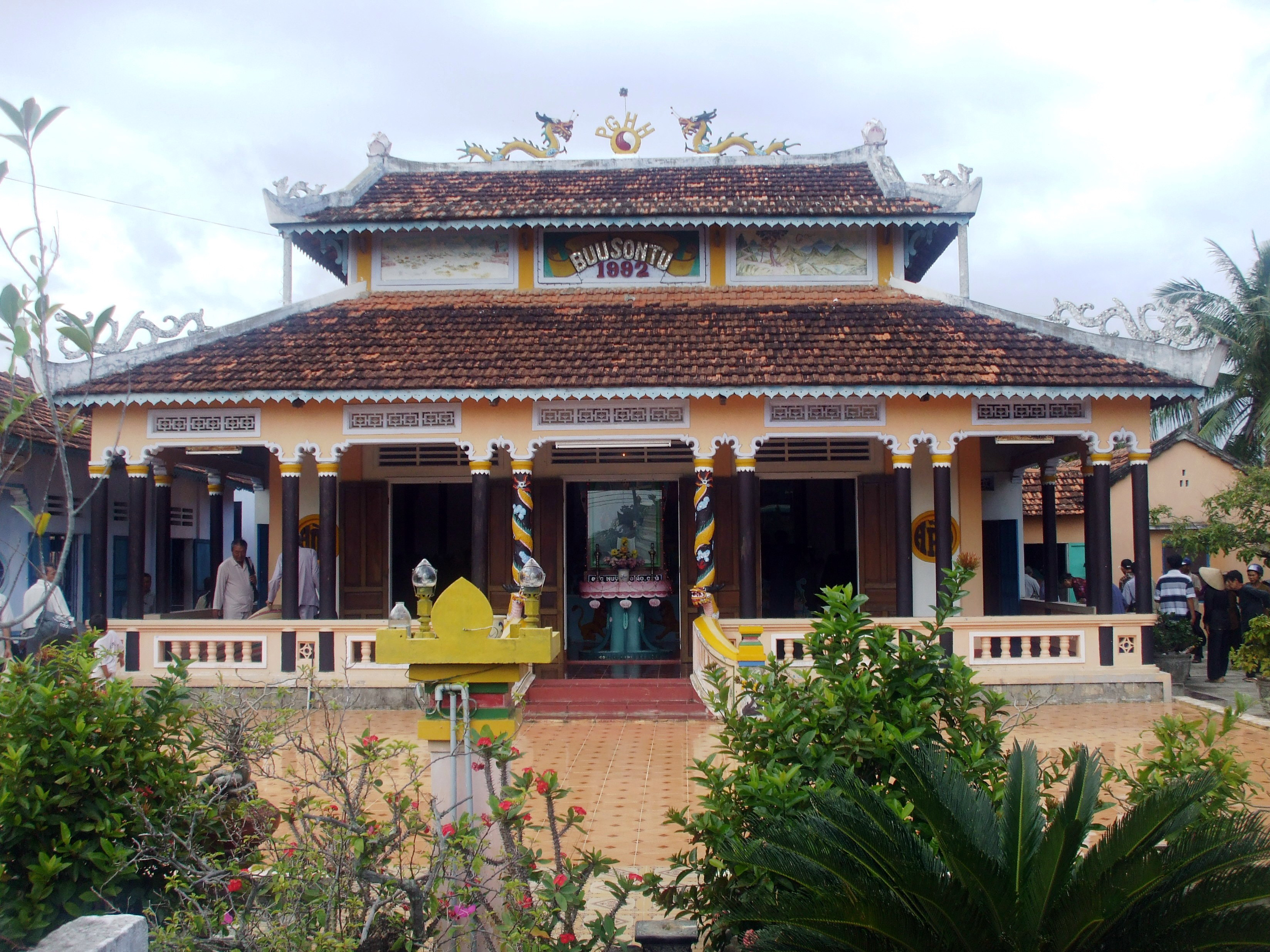
- Bửu Sơn Tự
- Interactive map of Sông Cầu
- Coordinates: 13.455922047011297°N 109.22337346595387°E
- Country: Vietnam
- Region: South Central Coast and Central Highlands
- Province: Đắk Lắk
- Established: 2025
- Administrative headquarters: 04 Lê Lợi Street, Long Hải Residential Group

Area
  - Total: 90.49 km^{2} (34.94 sq mi)

Population (31 December 2022)
  - Total: 38,891
  - Density: 429/km^{2} (1,110/sq mi)
- Website: songcau.daklak.gov.vn

Sông Cầu is a ward in Đắk Lắk province, Vietnam.

On 16 June 2025:

- District-level administrative units throughout Vietnam ceased operations from 1 July 2025.
- The entire area and population of Xuân Yên Ward, Xuân Phú Ward, Xuân Phương Commune, and Xuân Thịnh Commune, formerly part of Sông Cầu town, Phú Yên province, were merged to form a new ward named Sông Cầu.
