= Sơn Hòa district =

Coordinates: 13.167°N 108.917°E

Sơn Hòa district Huyện Sơn Hòa
- District
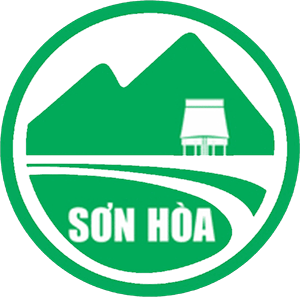
- Seal
- Interactive map of Sơn Hòa district
- Country: Vietnam
- Region: South Central Coast
- Province: Phú Yên
- Capital: Củng Sơn

Area
  - Total: 370 sq mi (950 km^{2})

Population (2003)
  - Total: 57,835
- Time zone: UTC+7 (Indochina Time)

Sơn Hòa is a former rural district (huyện) of Phú Yên province in the South Central Coastal region of Vietnam. As of 2003 the district had a population of 50,212. The district covers an area of 950 km^{2}. The district capital lies at Củng Sơn.

== Climate ==
Climate data for Sơn Hòa
Month	Jan	Feb	Mar	Apr	May	Jun	Jul	Aug	Sep	Oct	Nov	Dec	Year
Record high °C (°F)	33.2 (91.8)	38.3 (100.9)	39.8 (103.6)	42.1 (107.8)	41.5 (106.7)	40.2 (104.4)	39.6 (103.3)	38.9 (102.0)	38.3 (100.9)	35.5 (95.9)	34.3 (93.7)	32.7 (90.9)	42.1 (107.8)
Mean daily maximum °C (°F)	27.2 (81.0)	29.4 (84.9)	32.3 (90.1)	35.0 (95.0)	35.7 (96.3)	34.6 (94.3)	34.5 (94.1)	34.1 (93.4)	32.7 (90.9)	30.2 (86.4)	28.3 (82.9)	26.7 (80.1)	31.7 (89.1)
Daily mean °C (°F)	22.2 (72.0)	23.4 (74.1)	25.4 (77.7)	27.8 (82.0)	28.8 (83.8)	28.7 (83.7)	28.4 (83.1)	28.2 (82.8)	27.1 (80.8)	25.6 (78.1)	24.2 (75.6)	22.6 (72.7)	26.0 (78.8)
Mean daily minimum °C (°F)	19.0 (66.2)	19.6 (67.3)	21.2 (70.2)	23.2 (73.8)	24.6 (76.3)	24.9 (76.8)	24.6 (76.3)	24.6 (76.3)	23.9 (75.0)	22.9 (73.2)	21.8 (71.2)	20.0 (68.0)	22.5 (72.5)
Record low °C (°F)	11.7 (53.1)	12.0 (53.6)	13.7 (56.7)	17.4 (63.3)	21.1 (70.0)	20.7 (69.3)	19.4 (66.9)	20.0 (68.0)	20.9 (69.6)	17.0 (62.6)	14.3 (57.7)	11.8 (53.2)	11.7 (53.1)
Average precipitation mm (inches)	27.7 (1.09)	10.1 (0.40)	33.5 (1.32)	40.0 (1.57)	147.7 (5.81)	109.0 (4.29)	92.3 (3.63)	109.7 (4.32)	208.1 (8.19)	426.5 (16.79)	393.1 (15.48)	123.5 (4.86)	1,734.6 (68.29)
Average rainy days	11.2	4.8	4.6	5.9	13.5	12.6	12.6	14.2	18.5	20.5	20.6	17.1	156.6
Average relative humidity (%)	85.2	82.3	80.0	78.2	77.5	76.0	74.9	76.3	82.8	88.3	88.6	86.8	81.4
Mean monthly sunshine hours	145.0	181.8	249.6	250.9	255.6	220.7	239.4	219.4	184.5	152.4	113.1	97.5	2,304.5
Source: Vietnam Institute for Building Science and Technology
