= Hinh River =

River in Vietnam

- Location within Vietnam
- Native name: Sông Hinh (Vietnamese)

Location
- Country: Vietnam
- province: Đắk Lắk

Physical characteristics
- Length: 88 km (55 mi)
- Basin size: 1.040 km²

Basin features
- River system: Đà Rằng River in Đức Bình Tây commune, Sông Hinh River, Phú Yên province

The Hinh River (Vietnamese: Sông Hinh) is a river of Vietnam. It flows through Đắk Lắk Province and Phú Yên Province for 88 kilometres and has a basin area of 1040 km². The river flows through Sông Hinh District ("Hinh River District"). It is a tributary of Đà Rằng River.
