= Đồng Xuân district =

Đồng Xuân district Huyện Đồng Xuân
- District
- Interactive map of Đồng Xuân district
- Country: Vietnam
- Region: South Central Coast
- Province: Phú Yên
- Capital: La Hai

Area
  - Total: 410 sq mi (1,063 km^{2})

Population (2003)
  - Total: 63,715
- Time zone: UTC+7 (Indochina Time)

Đồng Xuân is a former rural district (huyện) of Phú Yên province in the South Central Coast region of Vietnam. As of 2003, the district had a population of 59,260. The district covers an area of 1,063 km^{2}. The district capital lies at La Hai.
