= Ganh Da Dia =

Gành Đá Đĩa
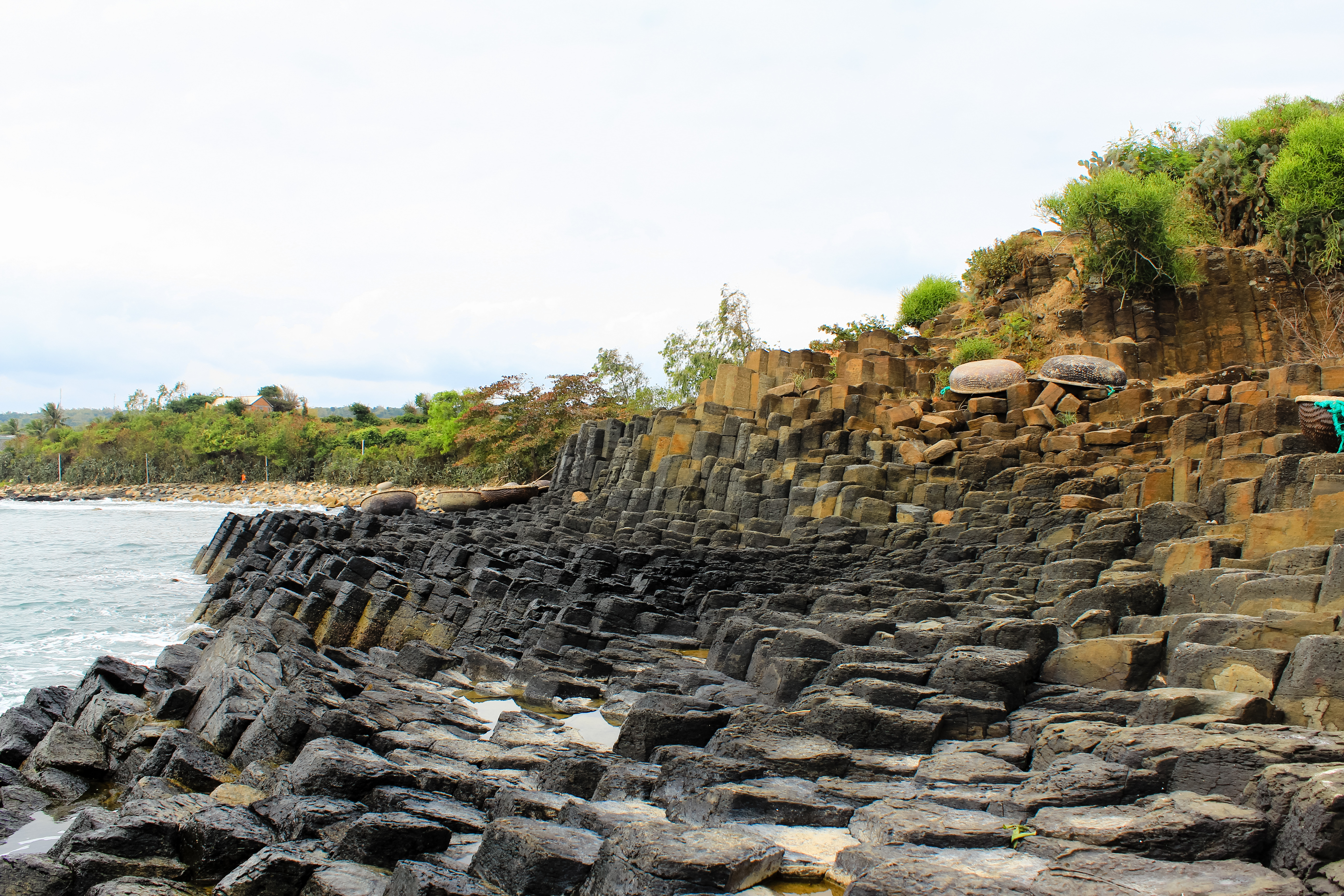
- View of Gành Đá Đĩa
- Interactive map of Gành Đá Đĩa
- 13°20′06″N 109°17′53″E
- Location: An Ninh Đông, Tuy An District, Phú Yên Province, Vietnam

Site notes
- Area: 25,000 m^{2} (270,000 sq ft)

Gành Đá Đĩa or Ghềnh Đá Đĩa (literally meaning "The Sea Cliff of Stone Plates") is a seashore area of uniformly interlocking basalt rock columns located along the coast in An Ninh Đông, Tuy An District, Phú Yên Province, Vietnam. The site features approximately 35,000 dark lava columns with roughly flat surfaces in various polygonal shapes, resembling a gigantic beehive or a stack of dinner plates, which inspired its name. The formation spans about 100 meters in width and 250 meters in length. Recognized for its unique geological and scenic value, Gành Đá Đĩa was designated a National Scenic Site in 1997 and elevated to a National Special Relic in 2020.

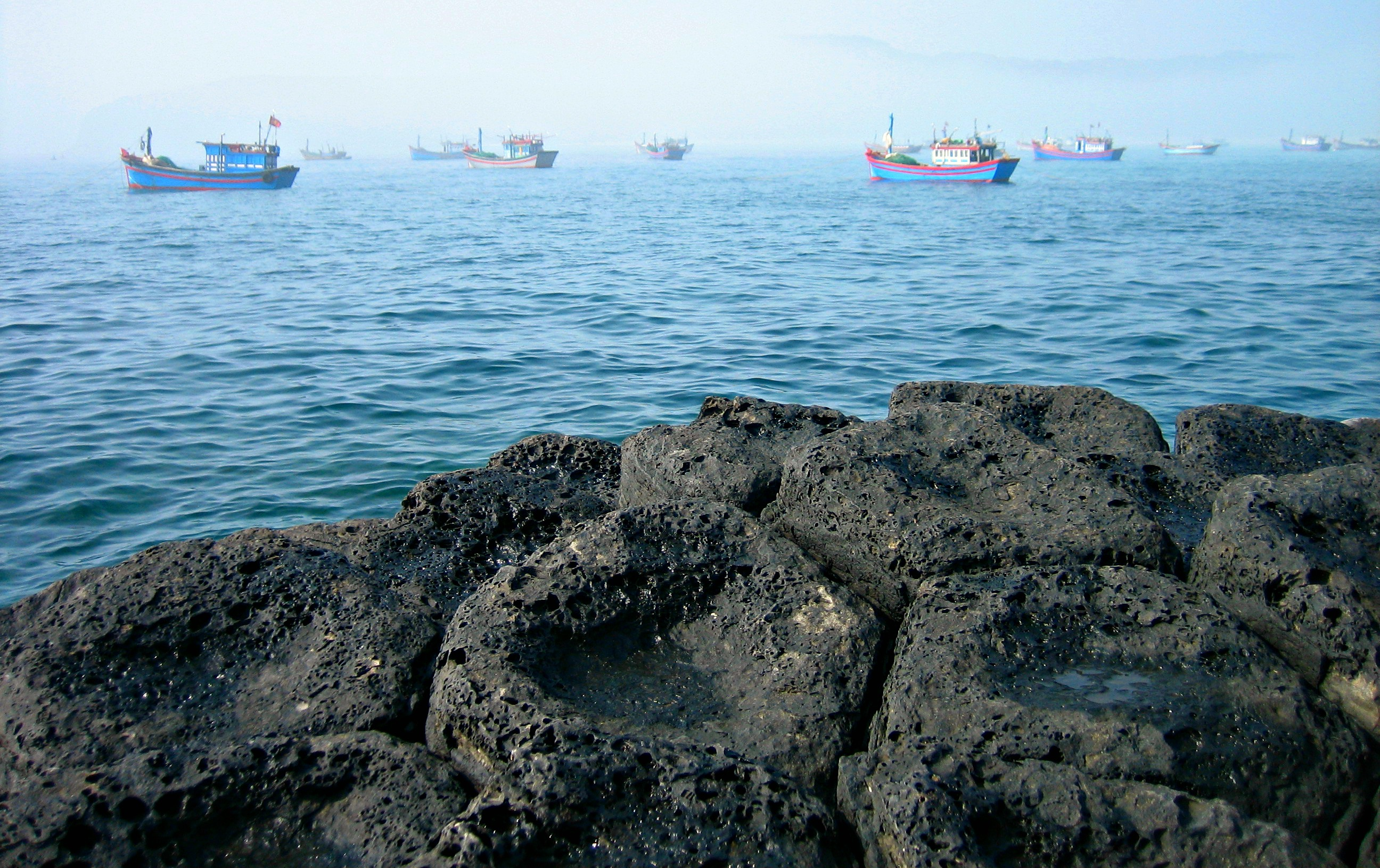
The basalt rocks at Gành Đá Đĩa

== Formation ==
The rock columns at Gành Đá Đĩa originated from volcanic activity millions of years ago in the central highlands of what is now Đắk Lắk Province. Molten basalt flows from eruptions in the Vân Hòa Plateau encountered cold seawater, causing rapid cooling and contraction that resulted in the characteristic polygonal cracking. This process formed vertical columns that further fractured horizontally due to wave action, creating the disk-like appearance. The main area consists of two promontories extending into the sea: a northern one with inclined and curved columns, and a southern one with mostly upright columns forming stepped levels from low to high.

== Cultural significance ==
Local folklore attributes the site's origin to supernatural events. One legend describes it as a treasure hoard of gold and jewels that was set ablaze by thieves, only to be transformed into stone by a whirlwind and explosion. Another tells of immortals who held a banquet with golden bowls and jade plates, forgetting them and allowing them to petrify over time. At the southwestern edge stands Lăng Đá Đĩa, a temple built around the mid-19th century during the reign of Emperor Tự Đức, dedicated to the worship of Nam Hải (the Whale God), a deity revered by local fishermen.

== Recognition ==
Gành Đá Đĩa was recognized as a National Scenic Site by Vietnam's Ministry of Culture and Information (now the Ministry of Culture, Sports and Tourism) on 23 January 1997. On 31 December 2020, it was elevated to the status of a National Special Relic by Decision No. 2280/QĐ-TTg of the Prime Minister.

== See also ==
- Giant's Causeway, a similar site in Northern Ireland
