= Cù Mông Pass =

Mountain pass in Vietnam

Coordinates: 13°41′N 109°11′E

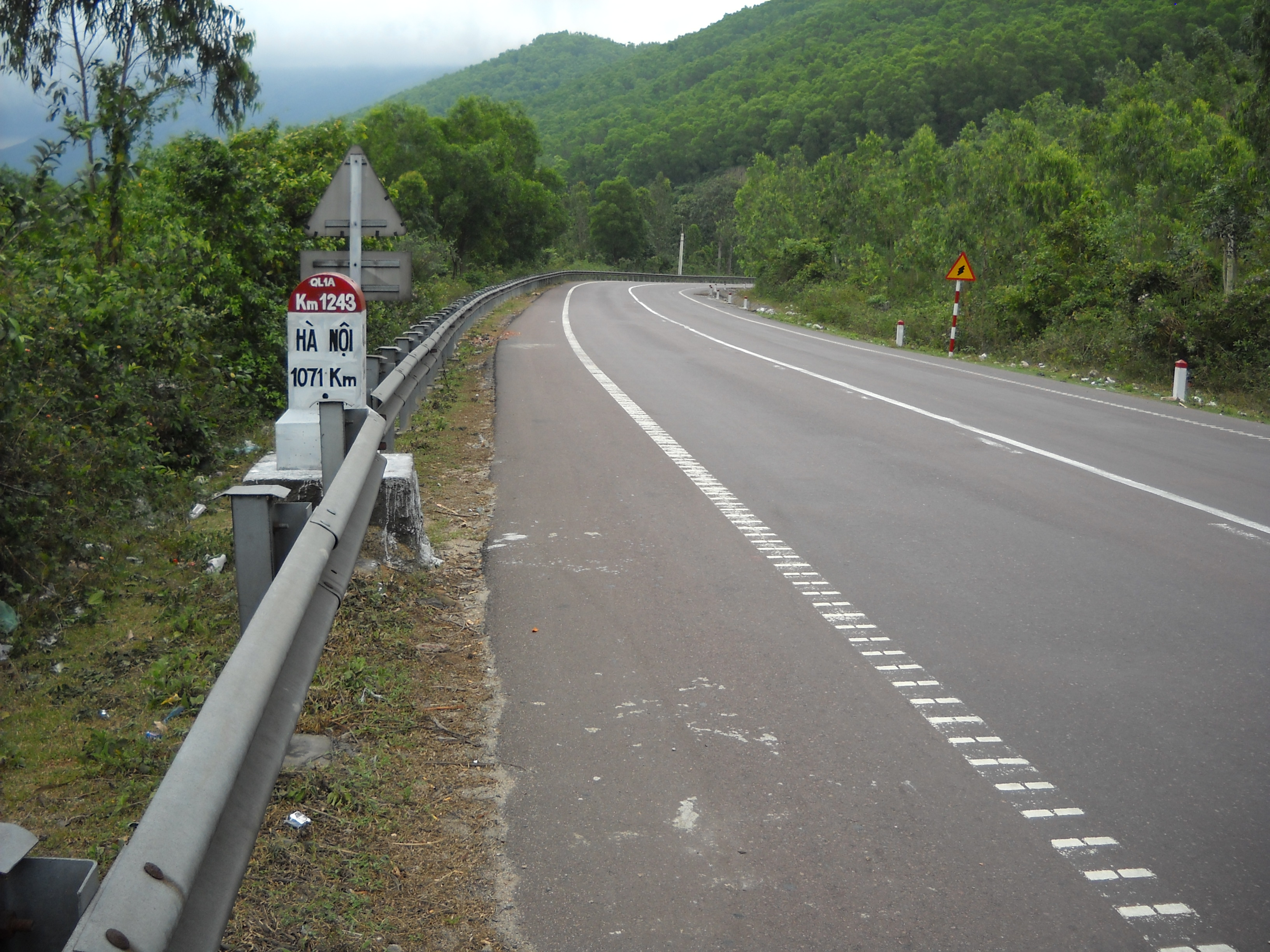
The Cù Mông pass, on the road south of Qui Nhơn

Cù Mông Pass (Đèo Cù Mông) is a mountain pass between Bình Định and Phú Yên provinces in Vietnam. It is on the 1A National Highway. In the 1470s, the pass marked the southern limit of the Lê dynasty extension of Vietnamese rule.
