= Đồng Hóa =

Đồng Hóa may refer to several places in Vietnam, including:

- Đồng Hóa, Hà Nam, a rural commune of Kim Bảng District
- Đồng Hóa, Quảng Bình, a rural commune of Tuyên Hóa District

== See also ==
- Đông Hòa (disambiguation)
