= Chư Sê district =

Coordinates: 13.667°N 108.133°E

Chư Sê district Huyện Chư Sê
- District
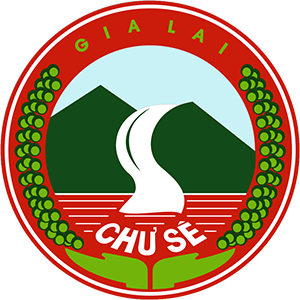
- Seal

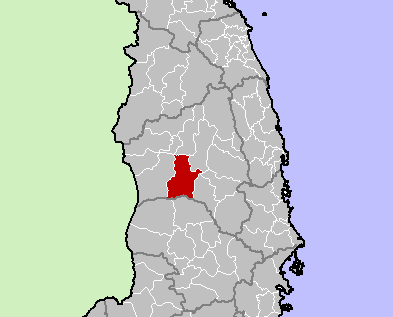
- Location in Gia Lai province
- Country: Vietnam
- Region: Central Highlands
- Province: Gia Lai province
- Capital: Chư Sê

Area
  - Total: 238.16 sq mi (616.82 km^{2})

Population (31/12/2024)
  - Total: 142,766
  - Density: 599.47/sq mi (231.45/km^{2})
- Time zone: UTC+7 (Indochina Time)

Chư Sê is a former district (huyện) of Gia Lai province in the Central Highlands region of Vietnam.

As of 2024 the district had a population of 142,766. The district covers an area of 616.82 km². The district capital lies at Chư Sê.
