= Phú Hòa district =

Phú Hòa district Huyện Phú Hòa
- District
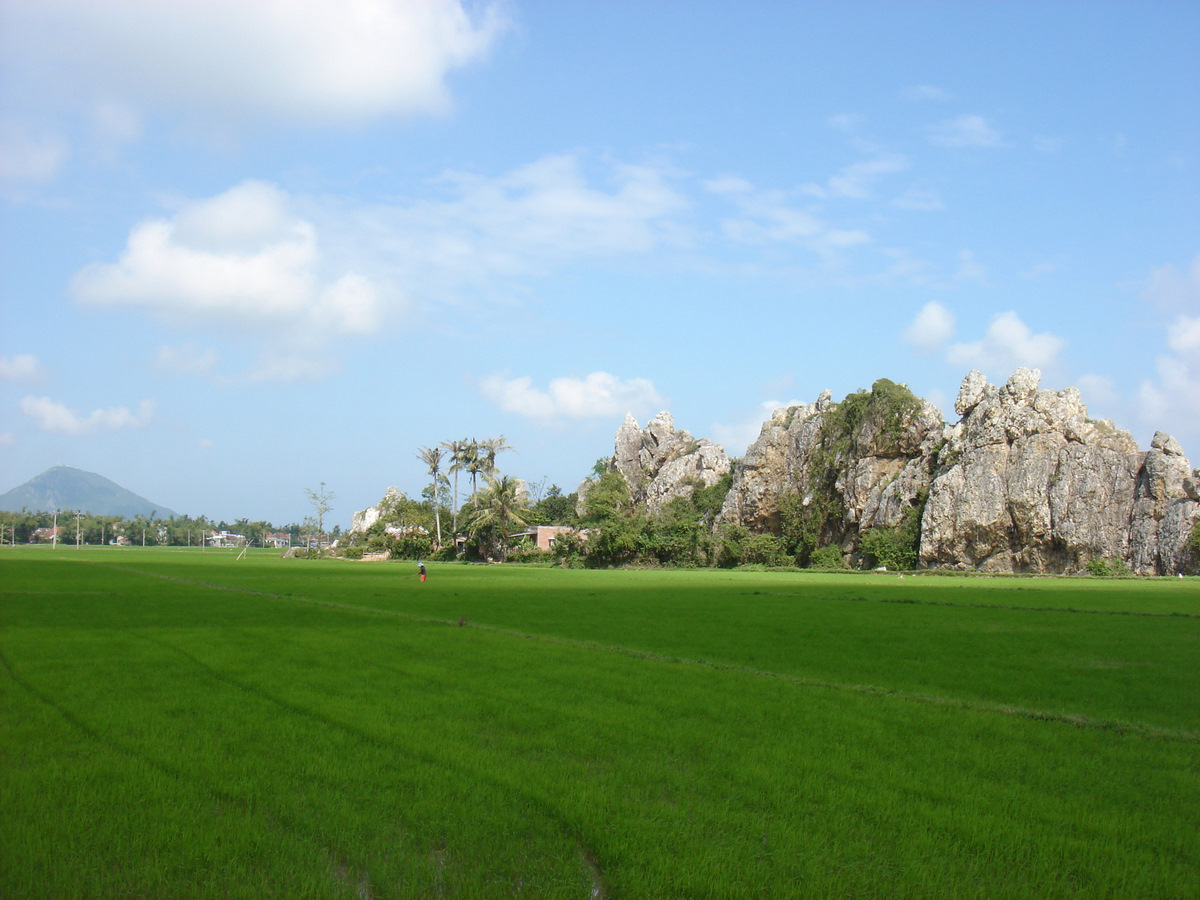
- Rock formation in Hòa Thắng
- Interactive map of Phú Hòa district
- Country: Vietnam
- Region: South Central Coast
- Province: Phú Yên
- Capital: Phú Hòa

Area
  - Total: 102 sq mi (263 km^{2})

Population (2003)
  - Total: 106,625
- Time zone: UTC+7 (Indochina Time)

Phú Hòa is a rural district (huyện) of Phú Yên province in the South Central Coastal region of Vietnam. As of 2003 the district had a population of 102,974. The district covers an area of 263 km^{2} (102 sq mi). The district capital lies at Phú Hòa.
