= Tuy Hòa =

- Ward
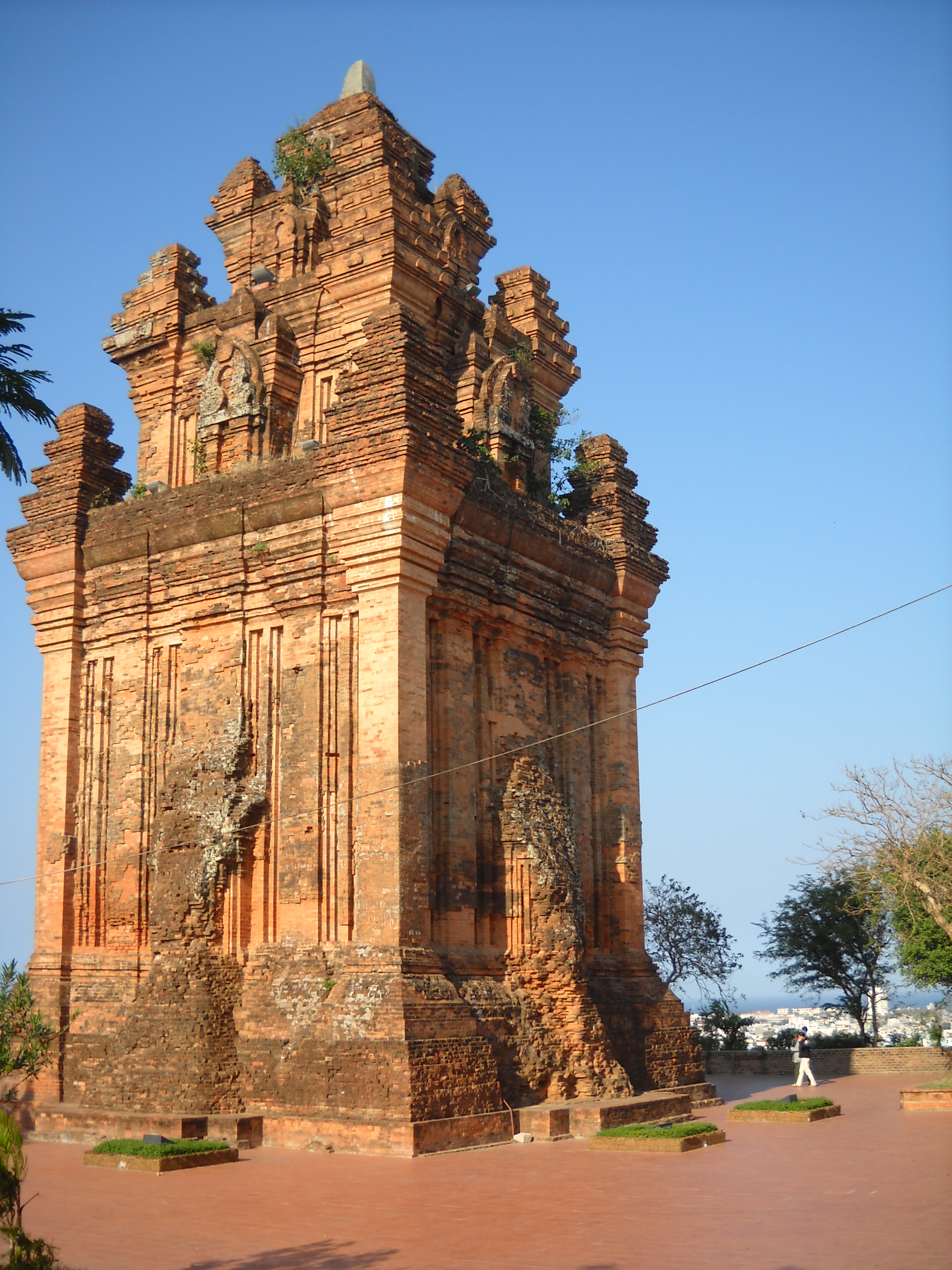
- Nhan Tower
- Interactive map of Tuy Hòa
- Coordinates: 13.084876472329672°N 109.30016927739524°E
- Country: Vietnam
- Region: South Central Coast and Central Highlands
- Province: Đắk Lắk
- Established: 16 June 2025
- Administrative headquarters: 76–78 Trần Hưng Đạo Street

Area
  - Total: 33.77 km^{2} (13.04 sq mi)

Population (2025)
  - Total: 126,118
  - Density: 3,734/km^{2} (9,670/sq mi)
- Website: tuyhoa.daklak.gov.vn

Tuy Hòa is a coastal ward in Đắk Lắk province, Vietnam. The ward inherited its name from the former city of Tuy Hòa, the provincial capital of the former Phú Yên province.

On 16 June 2025:

- District-level administrative units throughout Vietnam ceased operations from 1 July 2025.
- The entire area and population of Wards 1, 2, 4, 5, and 7, part of Ward 9 (all formerly part of Tuy Hòa city), and the remaining areas of Hòa An and Hòa Trị communes (formerly part of Phú Hòa district, Phú Yên province) were merged to form a new ward named Tuy Hòa.
