= Đông Hòa, Phú Yên =

Đông Hòa
- District-level town (Class-4)
- Đông Hòa Town; Thị xã Đông Hòa
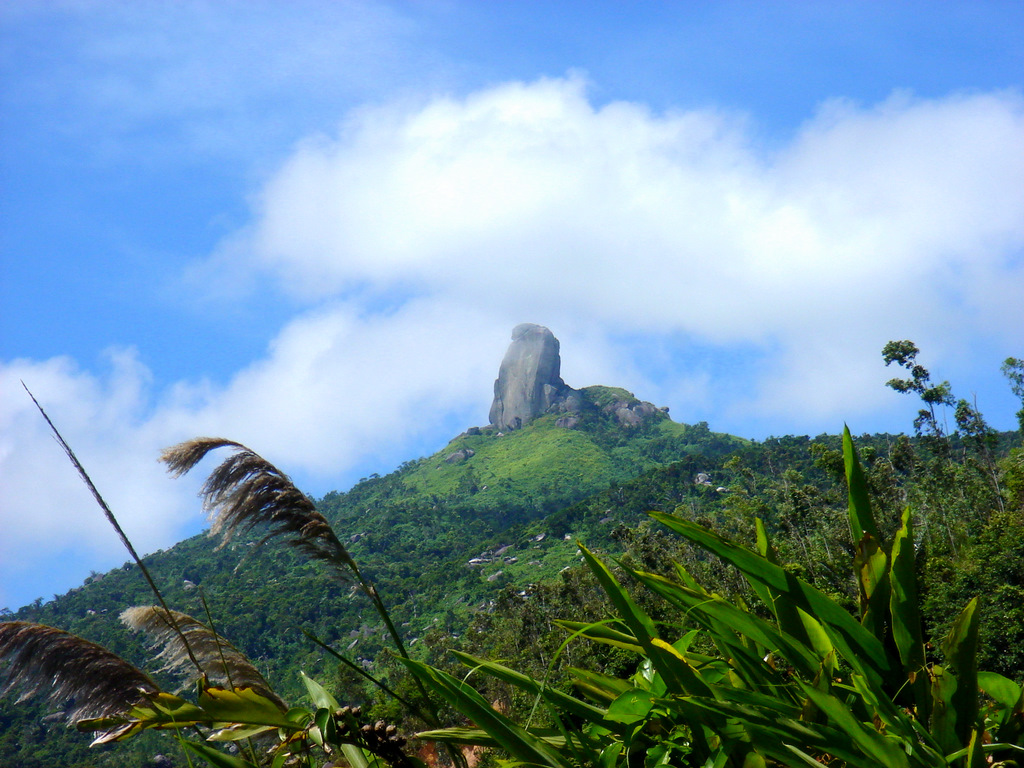
- View of Núi Đá Bia mountain
- Interactive map outlining Đông Hòa
- Location within Vietnam Location within Southeast Asia Location within Asia
- Coordinates: 12°59′35″N 109°19′53″E
- Country: Vietnam
- Region: South Central Coast
- Province: Phú Yên
- Seat: Hòa Vinh

Area
  - District-level town (Class-4): 102.56 sq mi (265.62 km^{2})
  - Urban: 37.88 sq mi (98.11 km^{2})

Population (2019)
  - District-level town (Class-4): 119,991
  - Density: 1,170/sq mi (452/km^{2})
  - Urban: 70,581
  - Urban density: 1,863/sq mi (719.4/km^{2})
- Time zone: UTC+7 (Indochina Time)

Đông Hòa is a former district-level town (thị xã) of Phú Yên province in the South Central Coast region of Vietnam. Đông Hòa is a new town. However it is now dramatically developing with a lot of foreign investments such as Hòa Hiệp and Hoa Thám Industrial zones. Notable sights in the district include Bia Mountain, Han Dam, and Vũng Rô Harbor.

Đông Hòa is subdivided to 10 commune-level subdivisions, including 5 wards (phường): Hòa Hiệp Bắc, Hòa Hiệp Nam, Hòa Hiệp Trung, Hòa Vinh and Hòa Xuân Tây, and 5 rural communes (xã): Hòa Tâm, Hòa Tân Đông, Hòa Thành, Hòa Xuân Đông and Hòa Xuân Nam.
