= Tuy An district =

Tuy An District Huyện Tuy An
- District
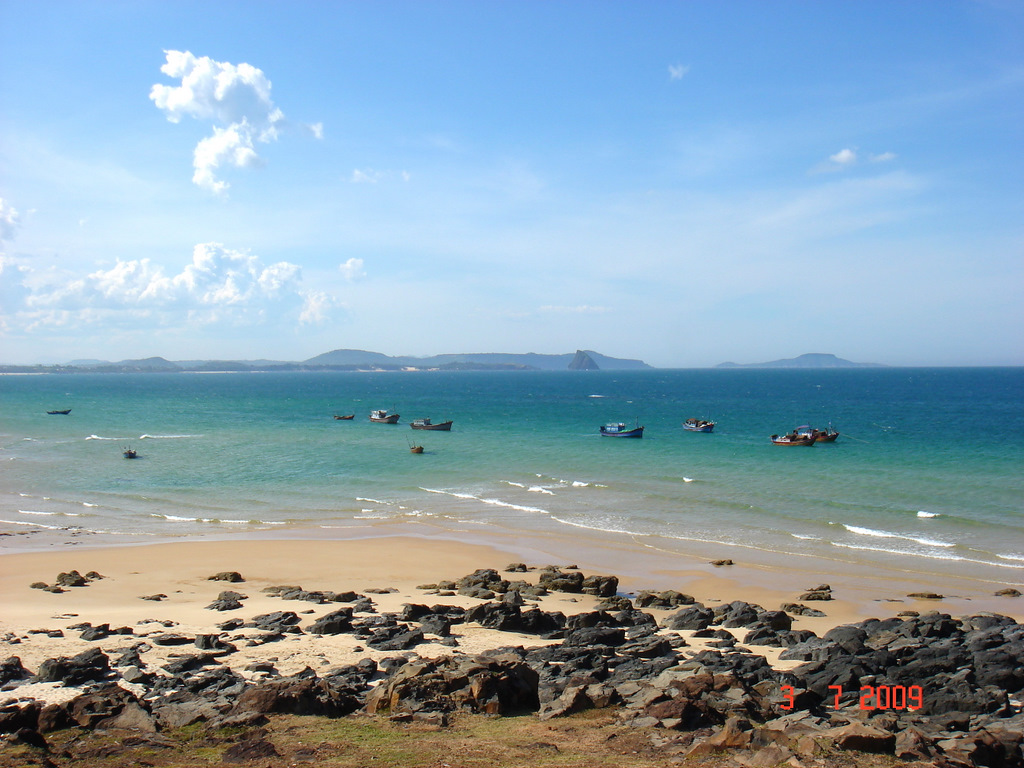
- View of Bãi Xép An beach

- Location of in Vietnam
- Coordinates: 13°16′00″N 109°12′30″E
- Country: Vietnam
- Province: Phú Yên
- Capital: Chí Thạnh (now part of Tuy An Bắc Commune)

Area
  - Total: 408 km^{2} (158 sq mi)

Population (2023)
  - Total: 123,727
  - Density: 303/km^{2} (785/sq mi)
- Time zone: UTC+07:00 (Indochina Time)

Tuy An District (Vietnamese: Huyện Tuy An) is a rural district (huyện) in Phú Yên Province in the South Central Coast region of Vietnam. It is known for its coastal landscapes, historical sites, and natural attractions.

== Geography ==
Tuy An District is located in the northern part of Phú Yên Province, bordering the East Sea to the east. It has a total area of approximately 408 km². The district features a mix of coastal plains, hills, and beaches. Notable natural features include rocky coastlines and lagoons. The district is traversed by National Route 1 and the North–South railway. Ongoing infrastructure projects include the Quy Nhơn – Chí Thạnh and Chí Thạnh – Vân Phong expressways.

== Administrative divisions ==
As of 2025, following administrative reorganizations, Tuy An District consists of 5 communes (xã):

- Tuy An Bắc
- Tuy An Đông
- Tuy An Nam
- Tuy An Tây
- Ô Loan

Prior to the 2025 mergers, the district had 1 town (thị trấn) and 14 communes.

== History ==
The area of Tuy An has a long history dating back to the 17th century. From 1611 to 1899, it was part of Đồng Xuân District. In 1899, Tuy An Prefecture was established, encompassing several communes. After the August Revolution in 1945, it was renamed Công Ái Prefecture and later became Tuy An District in 1947. During the Vietnam War era, it was redesignated as a district under various administrations. Post-1975, following reunification, Tuy An was merged and split several times, including a brief merger with Đồng Xuân in 1977 to form Xuân An District, which was dissolved in 1978. Further adjustments occurred in the 1980s and 2000s, with the most recent being the 2020 merger of An Hải and An Hòa into An Hòa Hải, and the major 2025 reorganization reducing the number of administrative units to five communes. Archaeological discoveries include hundreds of ancient stone tombs on A Man Mountain, dating back centuries, whose origins remain mysterious. A set of stone lithophones (đàn đá) was discovered in 1990 in An Nghiệp Commune.

== Economy ==
The economy of Tuy An is primarily based on agriculture, fishing, and tourism. The district is famous for its watermelon and other melon varieties, particularly in areas like Gành Dưa. Coastal communities rely on seafood harvesting and aquaculture. Tourism has grown significantly due to the district's natural beauty and historical sites. Infrastructure improvements, such as the reconstruction of Ông Cọp Bridge, the longest wooden bridge in Vietnam, support local economic development. Recent investments include over 3,400 billion VND for a coastal road connecting Tuy Hòa City to Tuy An.

== Notable sites ==
Tuy An is home to several tourist attractions:

- Gành Đá Đĩa: A national scenic spot featuring unique hexagonal basalt columns resembling stacked plates.
- Đầm Ô Loan: A large lagoon known for its seafood and scenic views.
- Mằng Lăng Church: A historic Catholic church built in 1892, one of the oldest in Vietnam.
- Bãi Xép: A picturesque beach featured in films.
- Thác Vực Hòm: A waterfall with rock formations similar to Gành Đá Đĩa.
- Làng đá Phú Hạnh: A village with traditional stone fences and houses.

Other sites include Chùa Đá Trắng, Hòn Yến, and ancient ruins.
