= Tây Hòa district =

Tây Hòa district Huyện Tây Hòa
- District
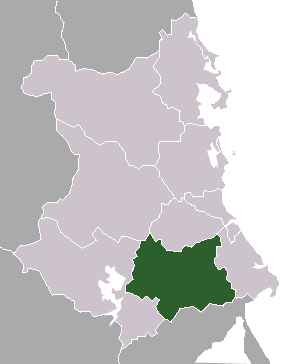
- Phú Yên highlighted in the map

- Location within Vietnam
- Country: Vietnam
- Region: South Central Coast
- Province: Phú Yên
- Time zone: UTC+7 (Indochina Time)

Tây Hòa is a former rural district (huyện) of Phú Yên province in the South Central Coastal region of Vietnam.
