= Sông Hinh district =

Coordinates: 12.917°N 108.917°E

Sông Hinh district Huyện Sông Hinh
- Rural District
- Seal
- Interactive map of Sông Hinh district
- Country: Vietnam
- Region: South Central Coast
- Province: Phú Yên
- Existence: 1471 to August 30, 2025
- Centrall hall: No.21, Trần Hưng Đạo road, Hai Riêng township

Government
  - Type: Rural district

Area
  - Total: 885 km^{2} (342 sq mi)

Population (2003)
  - Total: 38,102
  - Density: 43.1/km^{2} (112/sq mi)
- Time zone: UTC+7 (Indochina Time)
- ZIP code: 56600 (Note: An official code from 2023 to 2025.)

Sông Hinh [ʂəwŋ˧˧:hɨn˧˧] is a former rural district of Phú Yên province in the South Central Coastal region of Vietnam.

== Geography ==
Its name is the same as the river running through the district, the Hinh River. As of 2003, the district had a population of 380,102. The district covers an area of 885 km^{2} (342 sq mi). The district capital lies at Hai Riêng.

Sông Hinh district is subdivided to 11 commune-level subdivisions, including Hai Riêng township, and the rural communes of: Đức Bình Đông, Đức Bình Tây, Ea Bá, Ea Bar, Ea Bia, Ea Lâm, Ea Ly, Ea Trol, Sơn Giang and Sông Hinh.
