= Chư Sê =

Ward in Gia Lai province, Vietnam

- Ward
- Interactive map of Chư Sê
- Coordinates: 13.69750716661749°N 108.07585942552065°E
- Country: Vietnam
- Province: Gia Lai
- Established: 1988
- Administrative headquarters: 761 Hùng Vương Street

Area
  - Total: 124.75 km^{2} (48.17 sq mi)

Population (21 October 2026)
  - Total: 69,135
  - Density: 554.19/km^{2} (1,435.3/sq mi)
- Website: https://chuse.gialai.gov.vn

Chư Sê is a ward of Gia Lai Province, Vietnam.

== Geography ==
Chư Sê ward is a highland ward in the western part of Gia Lai province, approximately 200 km west of Quy Nhơn, 60 km northwest of Ayun Pa, and 40 km south of Pleiku. It is located in the area formerly administered by Chư Sê district. The ward borders the following areas:

- To the northeast, Bờ Ngoong commune.
- To the northwest, Ia Tôr commune.
- To the southwest, Ia Ko commune.
- To the south, Ia Hrú commune.
- To the east, Al Bá commune.

== History ==
On 12 June 2025, the 15th National Assembly adopted Resolution No. 202/2025/QH15 on the reorganization of provincial-level administrative divisions. Under the resolution, the entire natural area and population of Gia Lai province and Bình Định province were merged to form a new province named Gia Lai.

On 16 June 2025, the Standing Committee of the National Assembly adopted Resolution No. 1664/NQ-UBTVQH15 on the reorganization of commune-level administrative divisions in Gia Lai province in 2025. Under the resolution, the entire natural area and population of Chư Sê township and the communes of Dun, Ia Blang, Ia Pal, and Ia Glai, all formerly part of Chư Sê district, were merged to form a new commune named Chư Sê.

On 21 October 2026, the 13th-term Gia Lai Provincial People's Council adopted Resolution No. 386/NQ-HĐND approving in principle the establishment of Chư Sê ward. The new ward has a natural area of 124.75 km² and a population of 69,135. It was established with the same administrative boundaries as the former Chư Sê commune.
