= Phú Yên province =

Province of Vietnam

Phú Yên
- Province
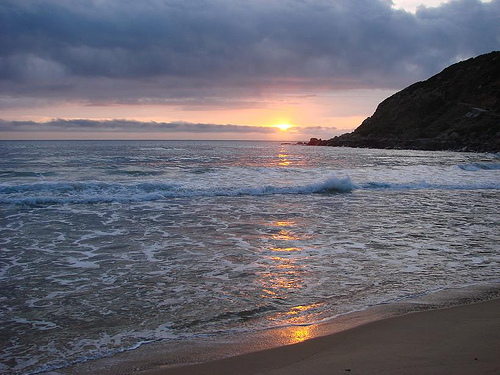
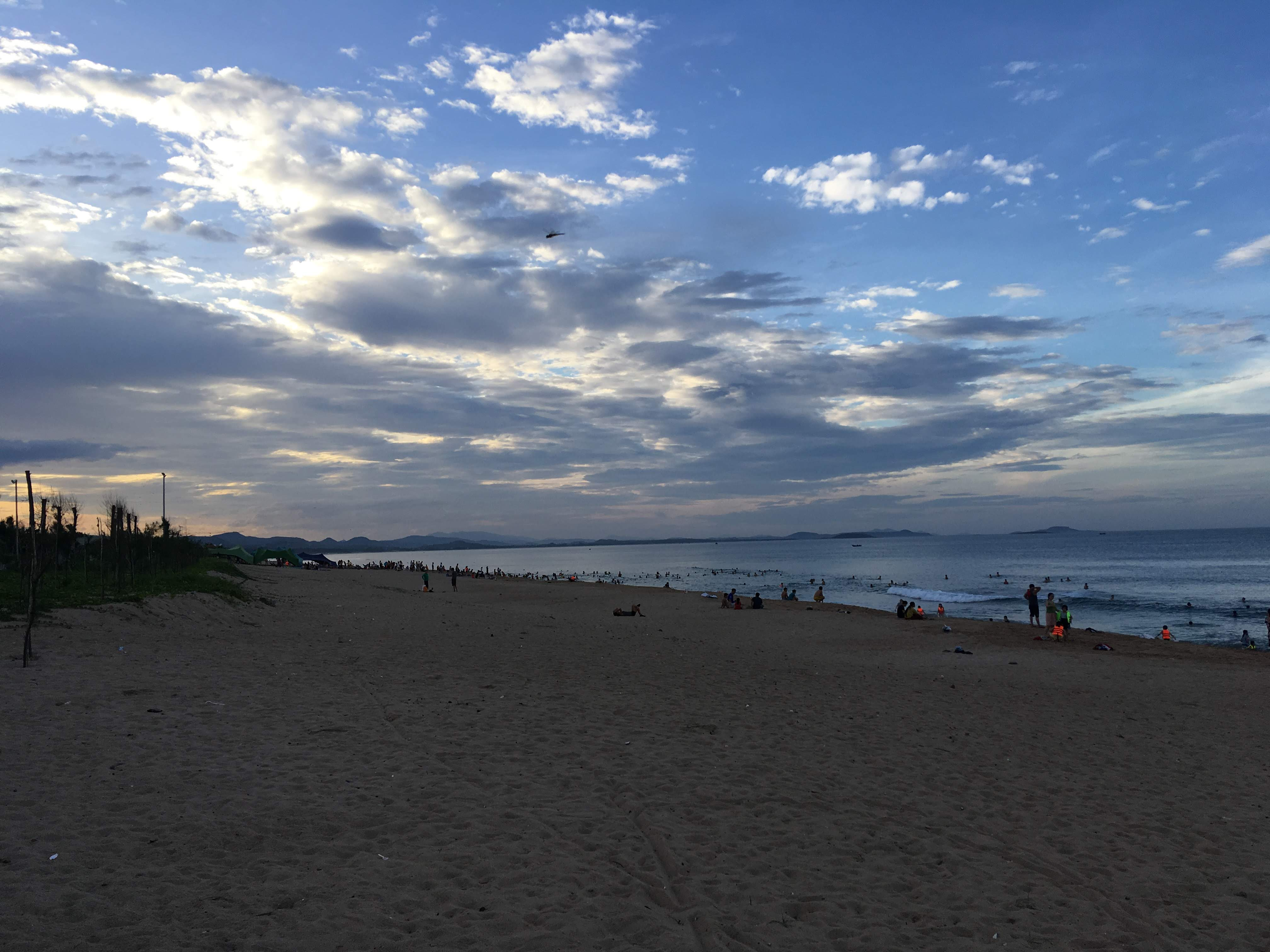
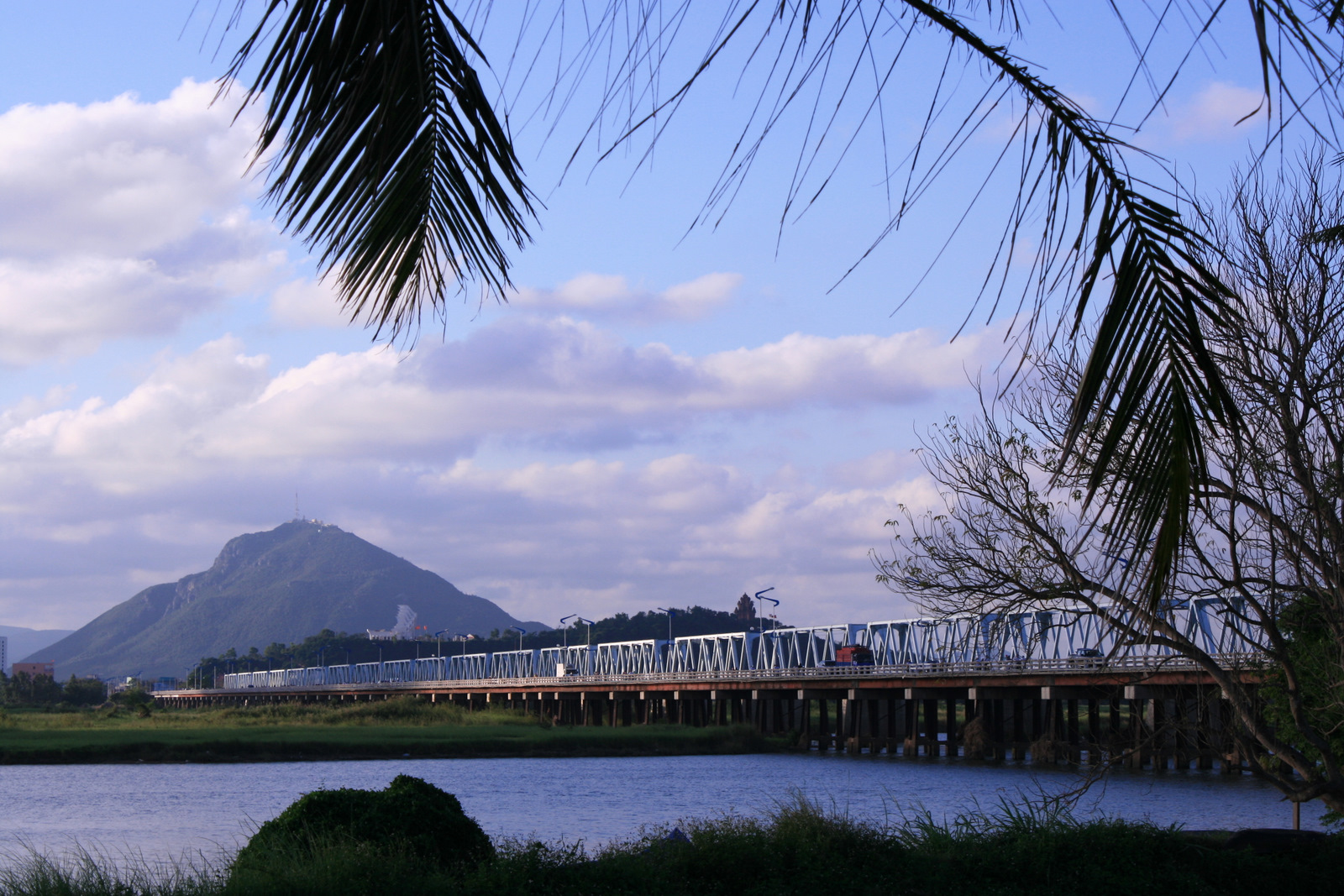
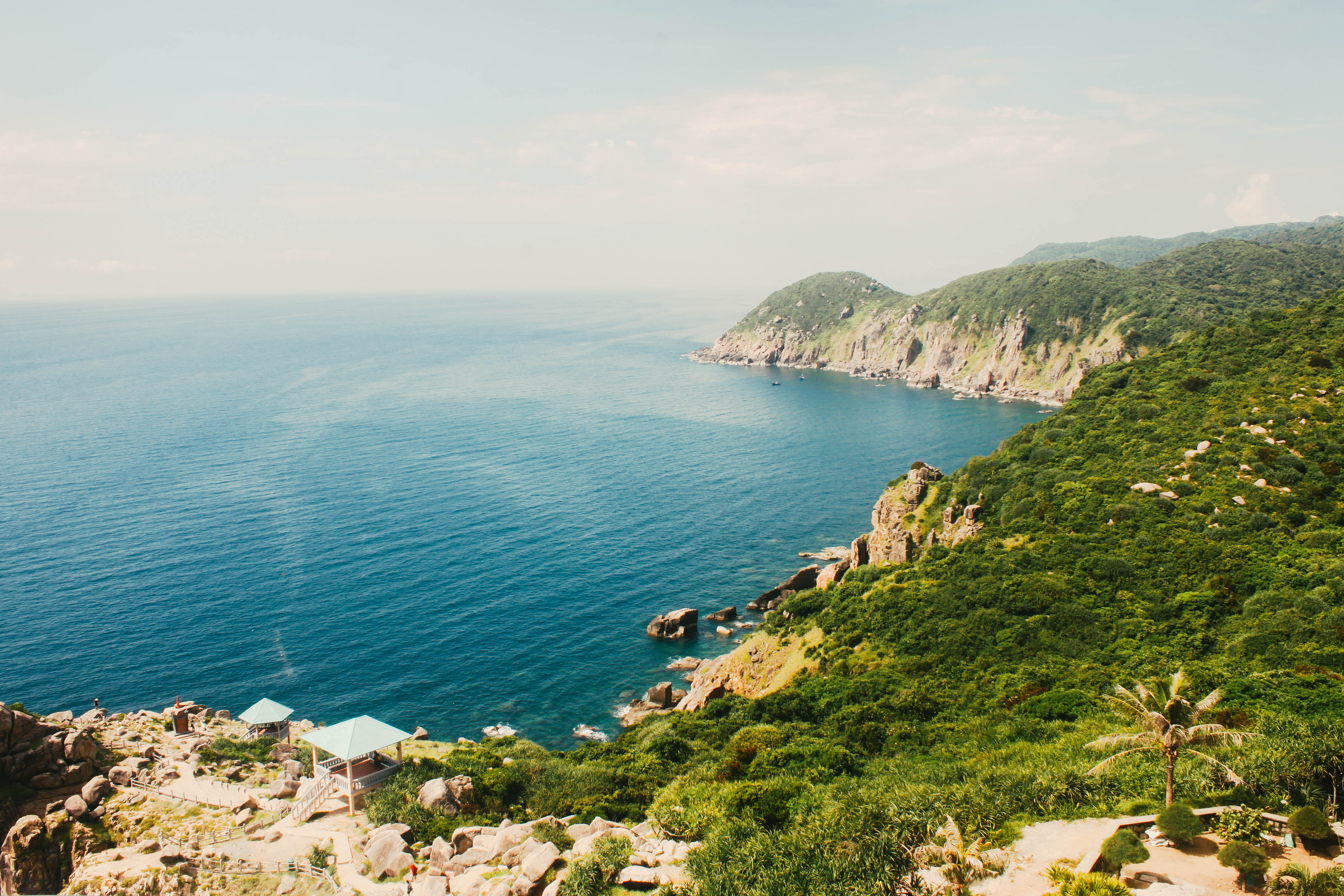
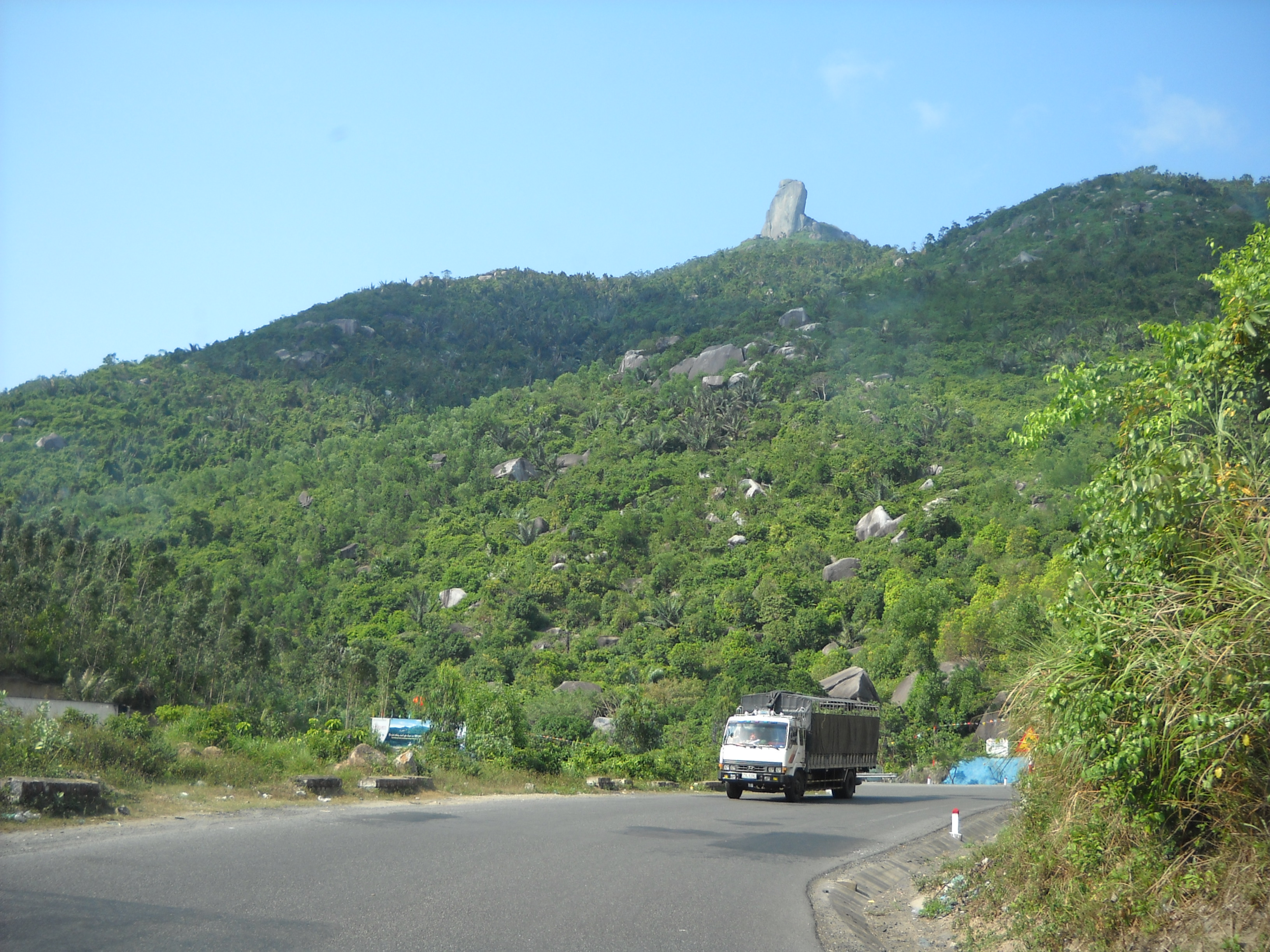
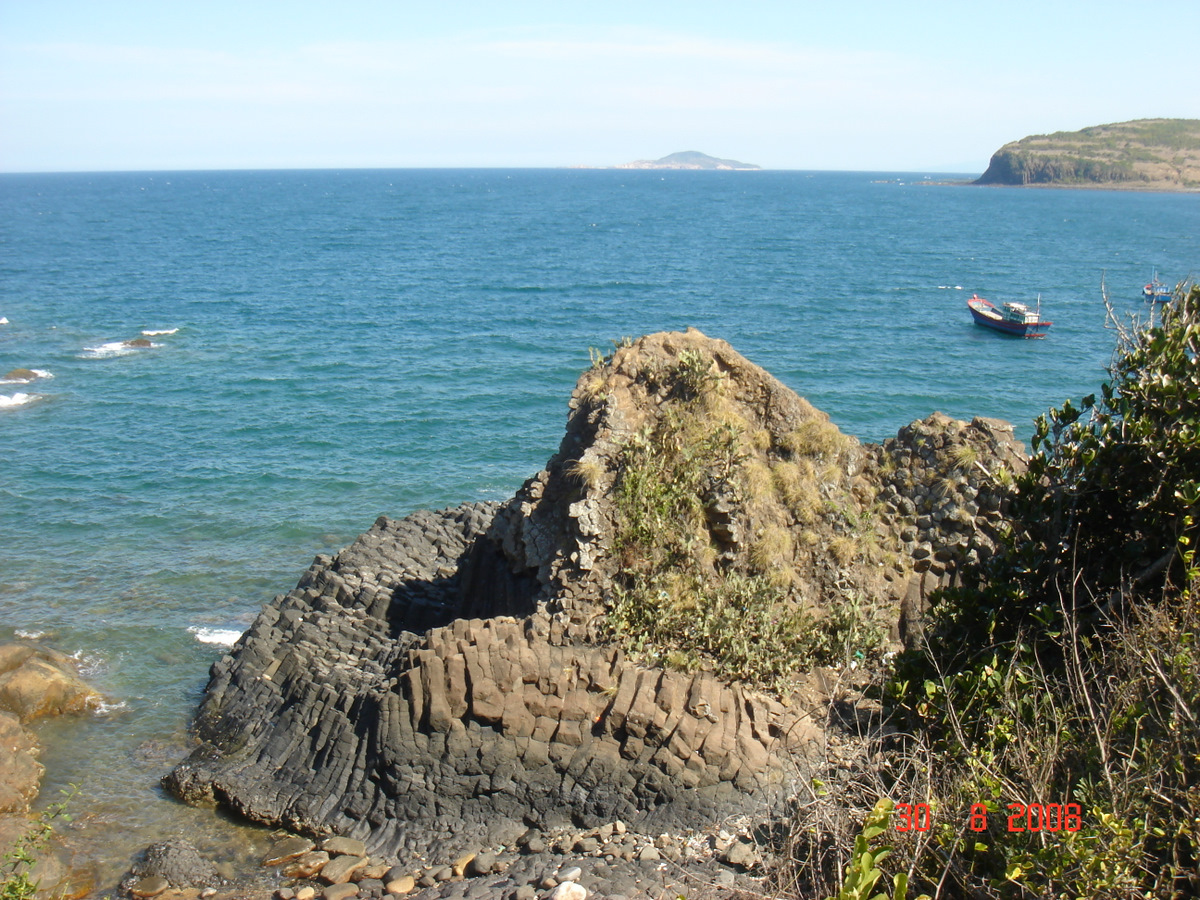
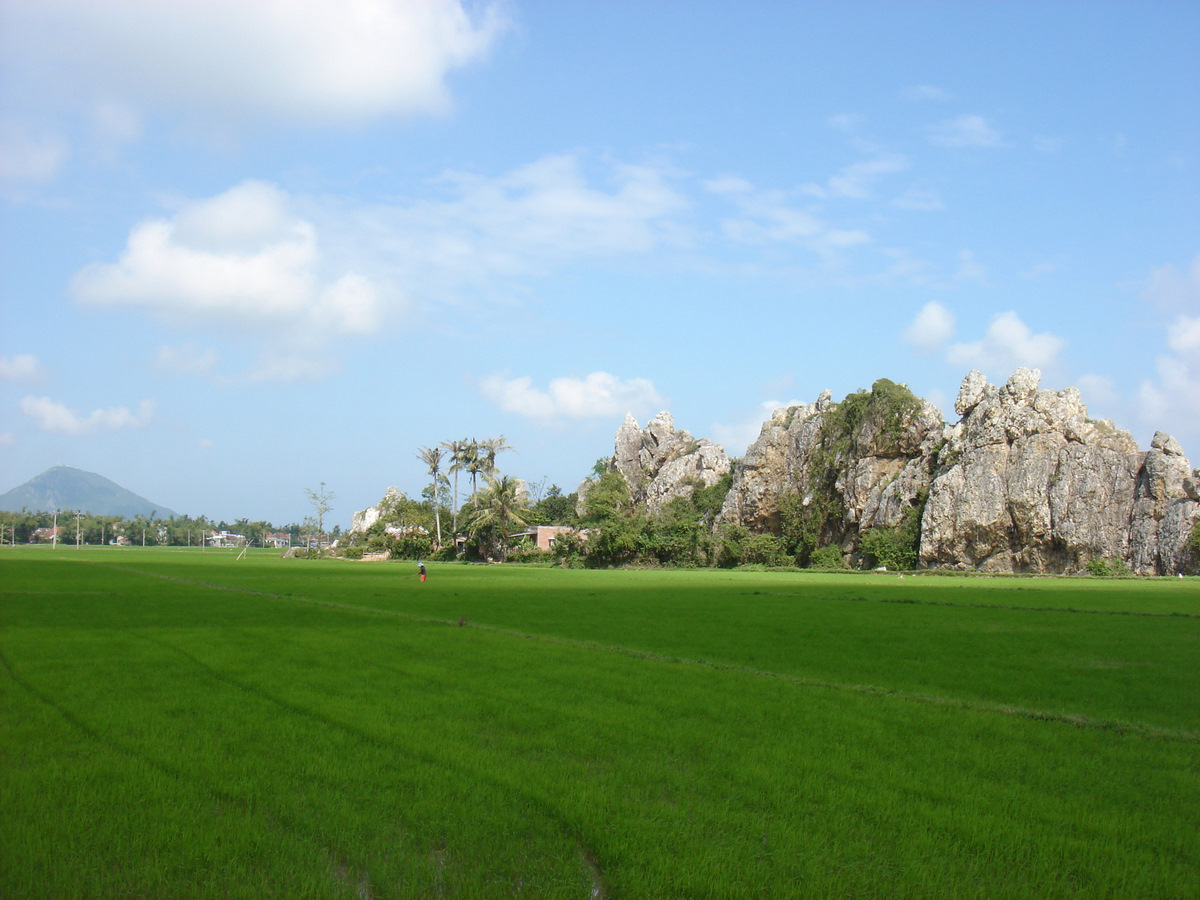
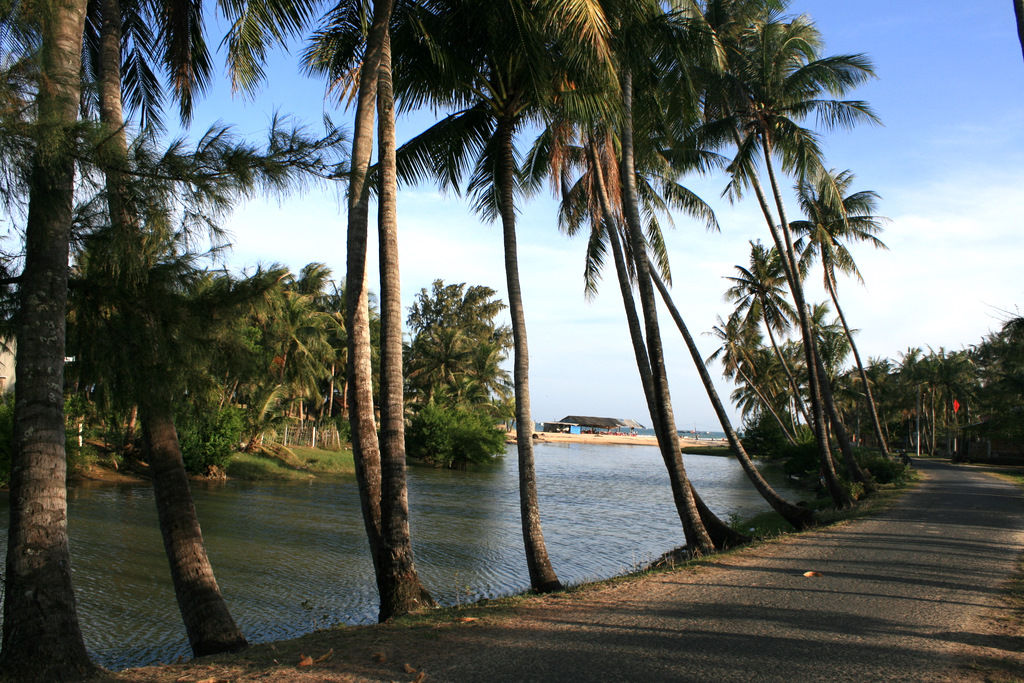
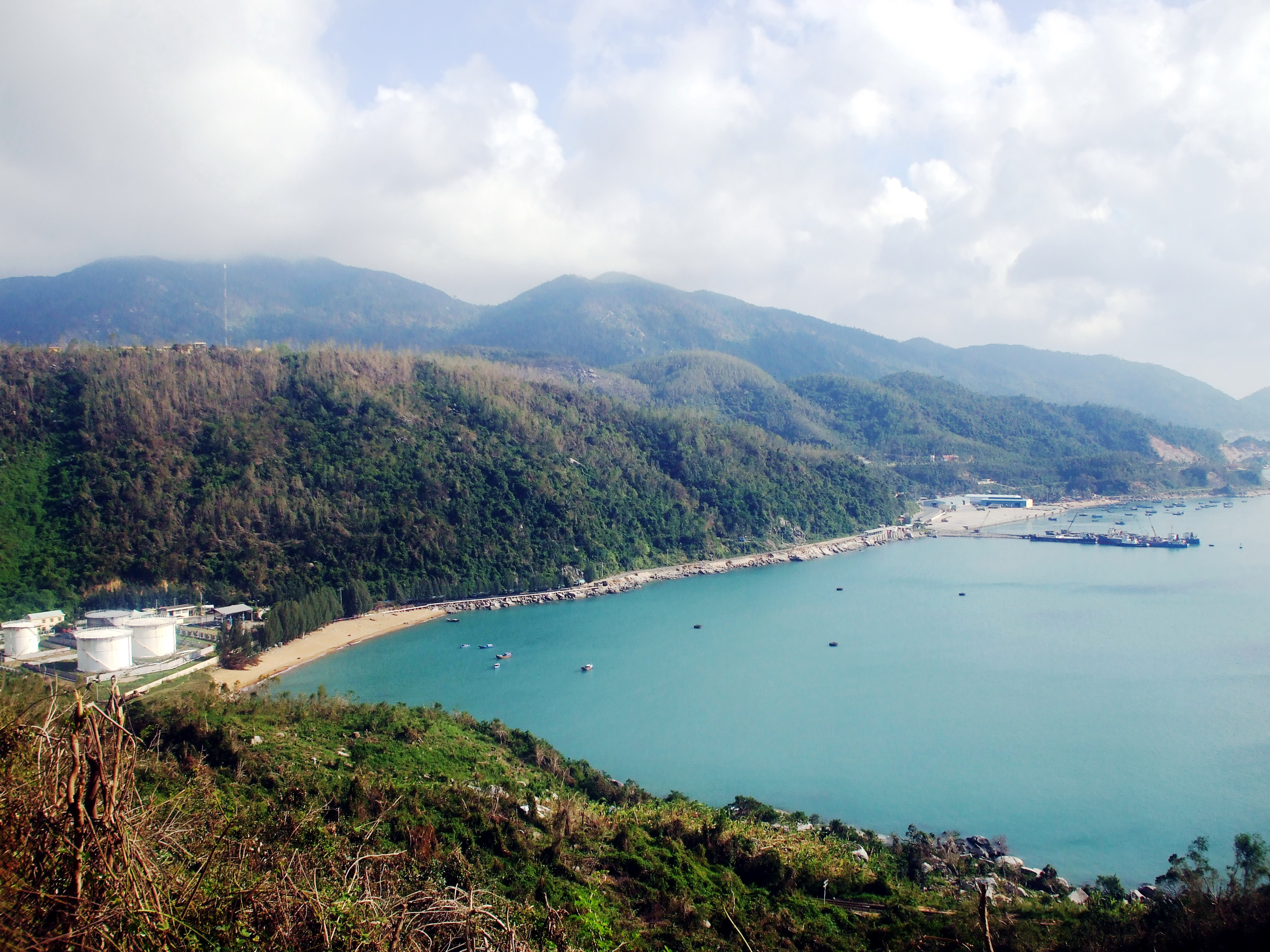
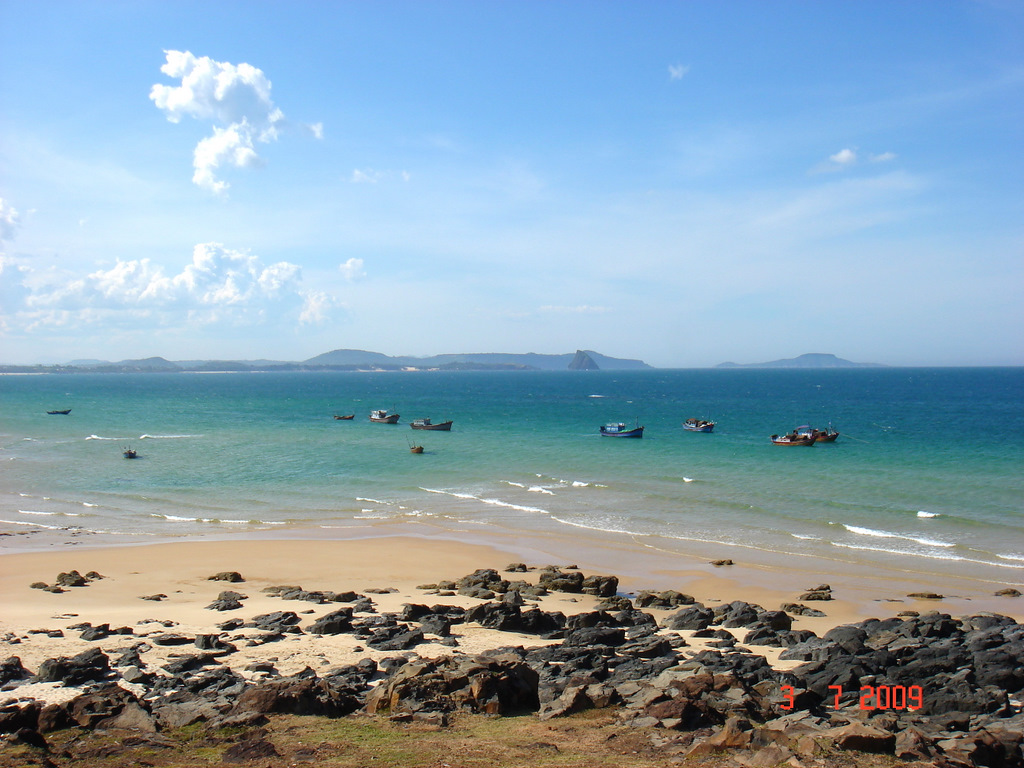
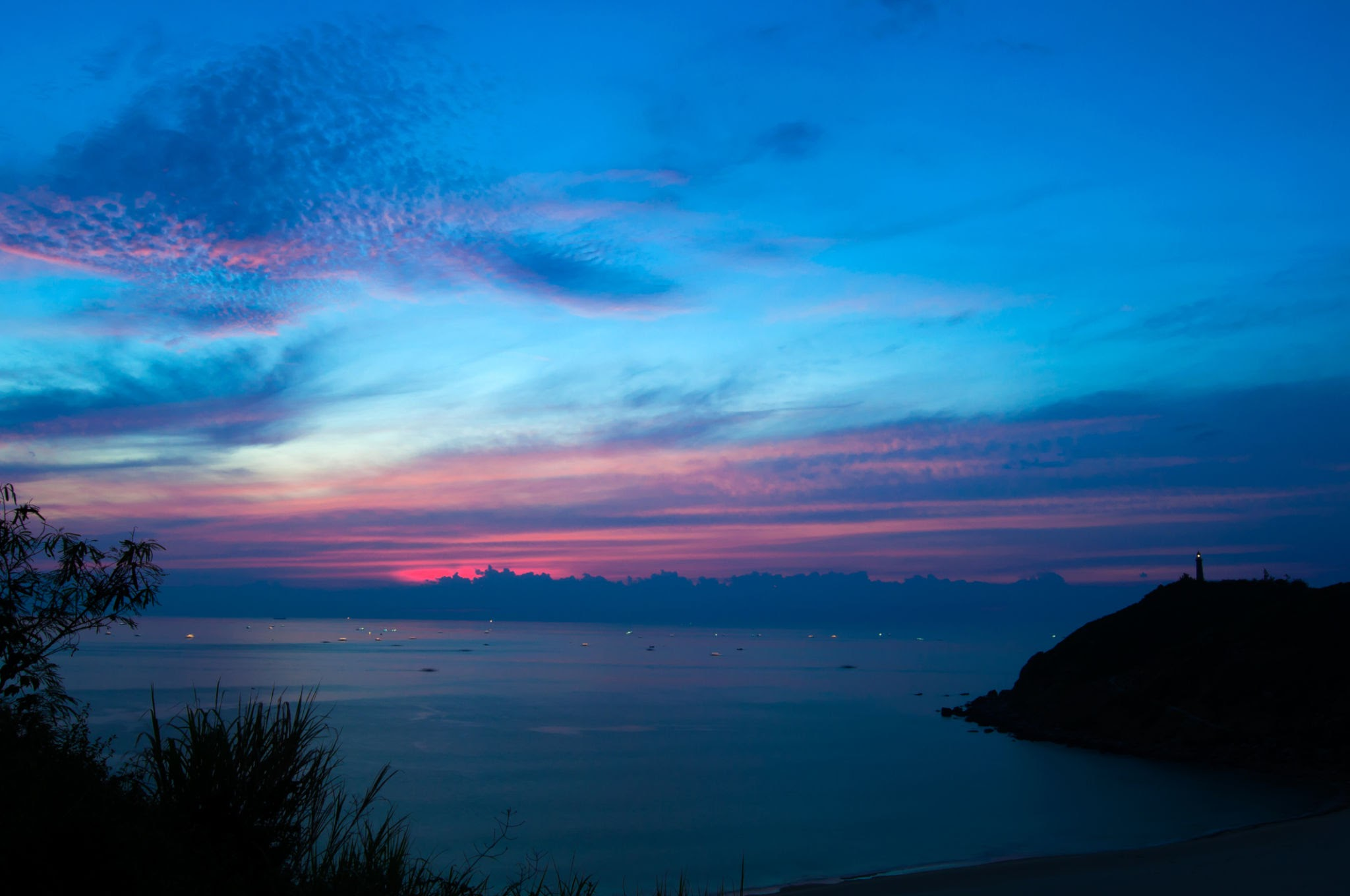
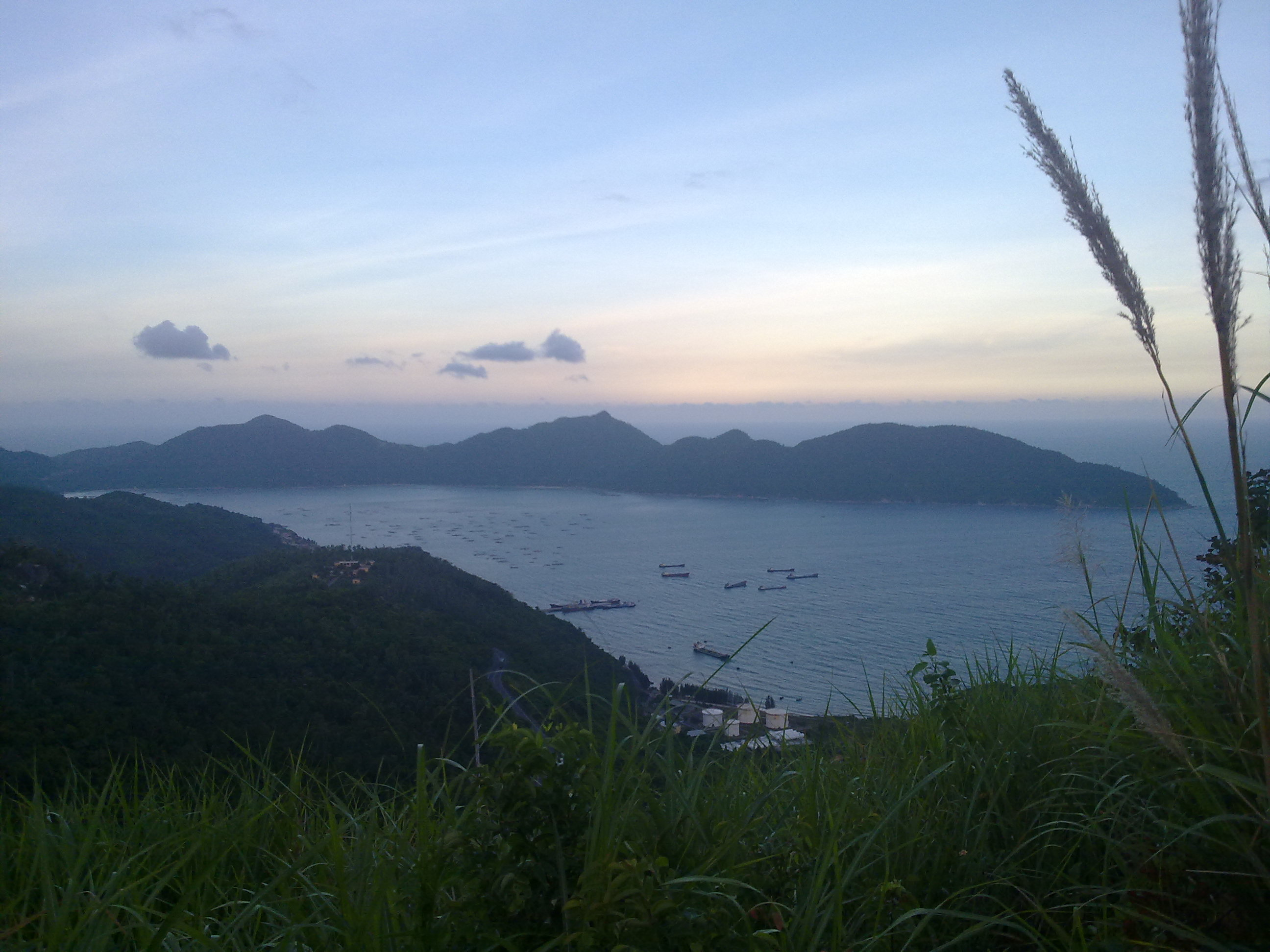
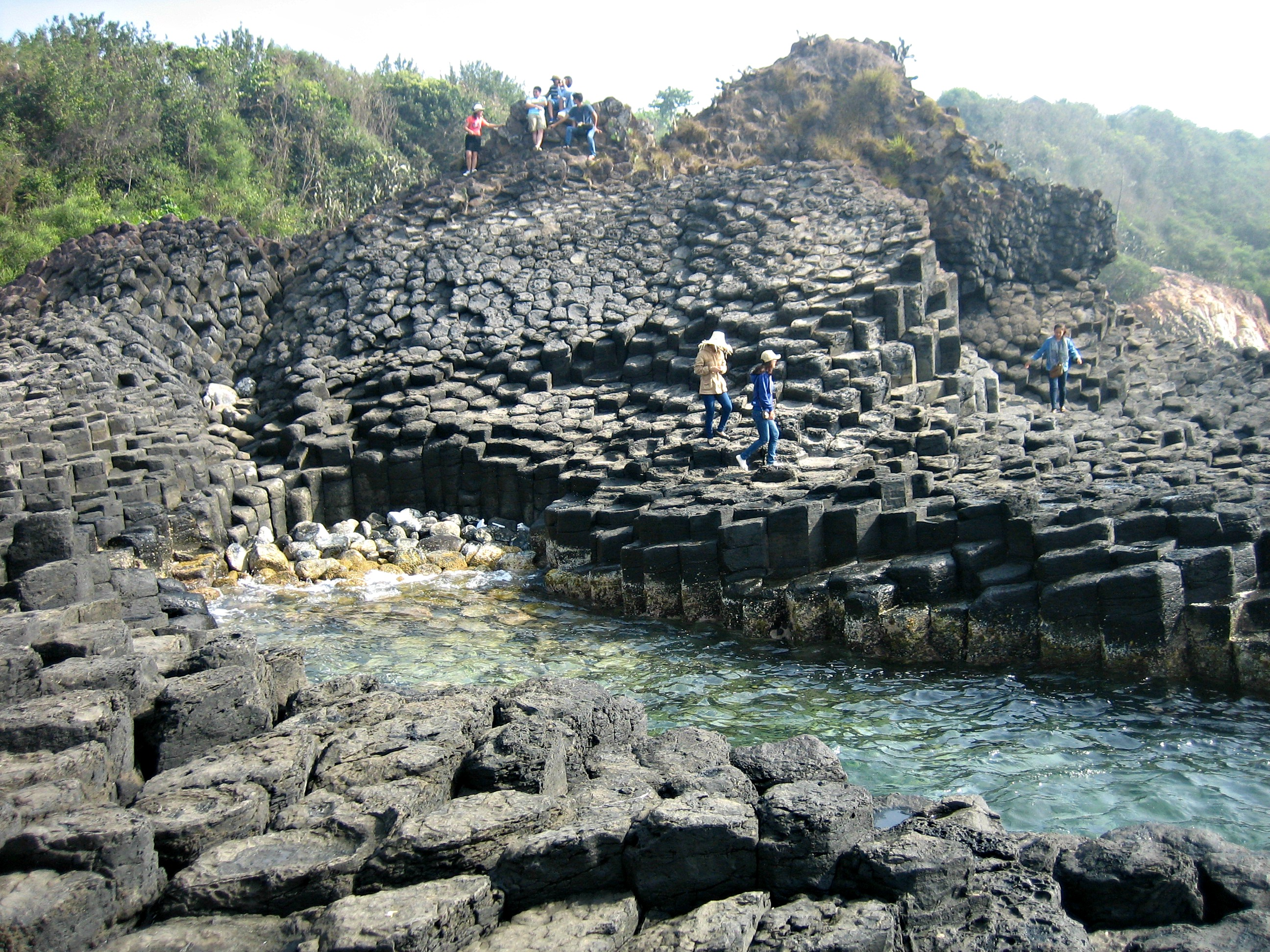
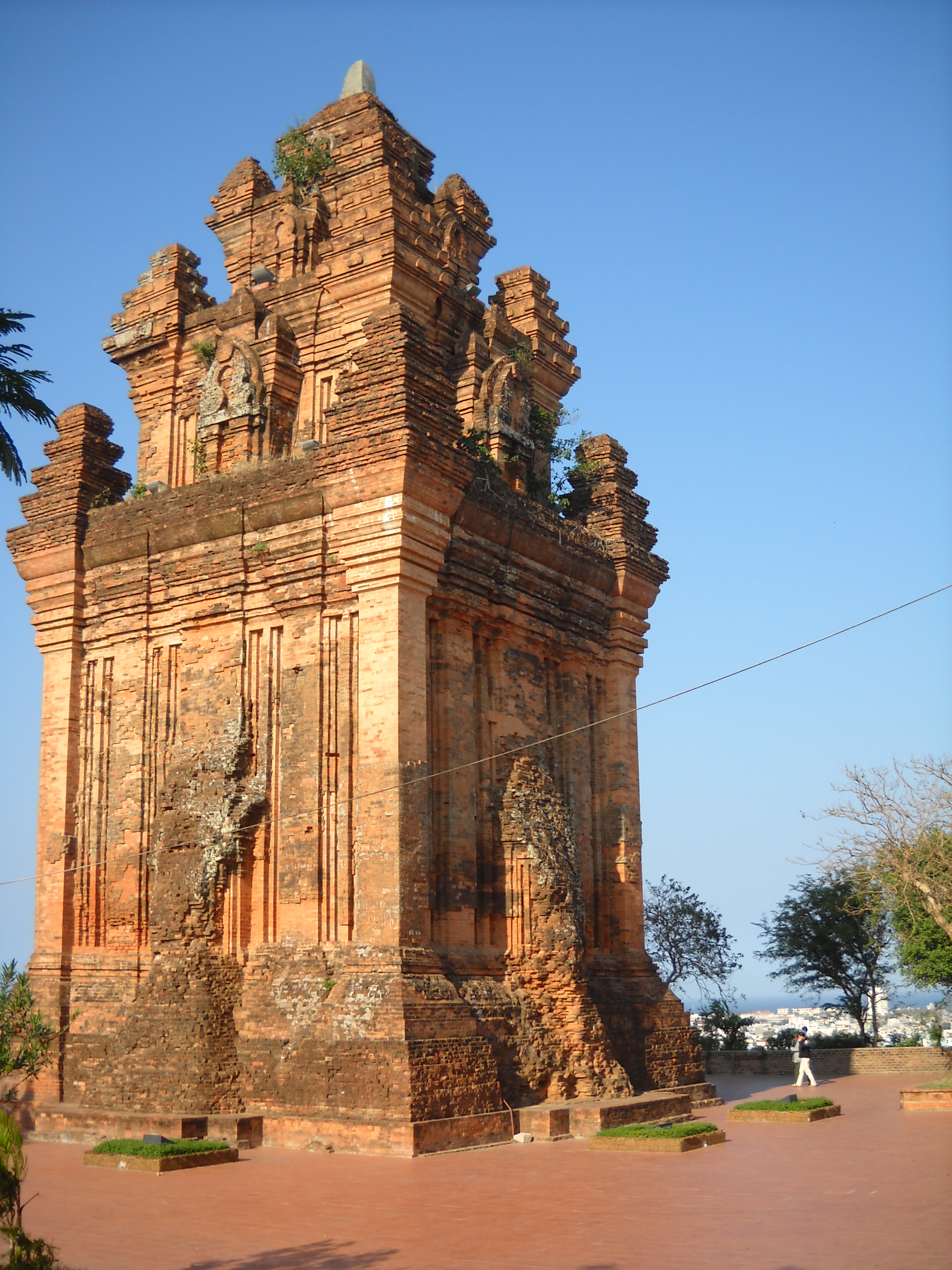
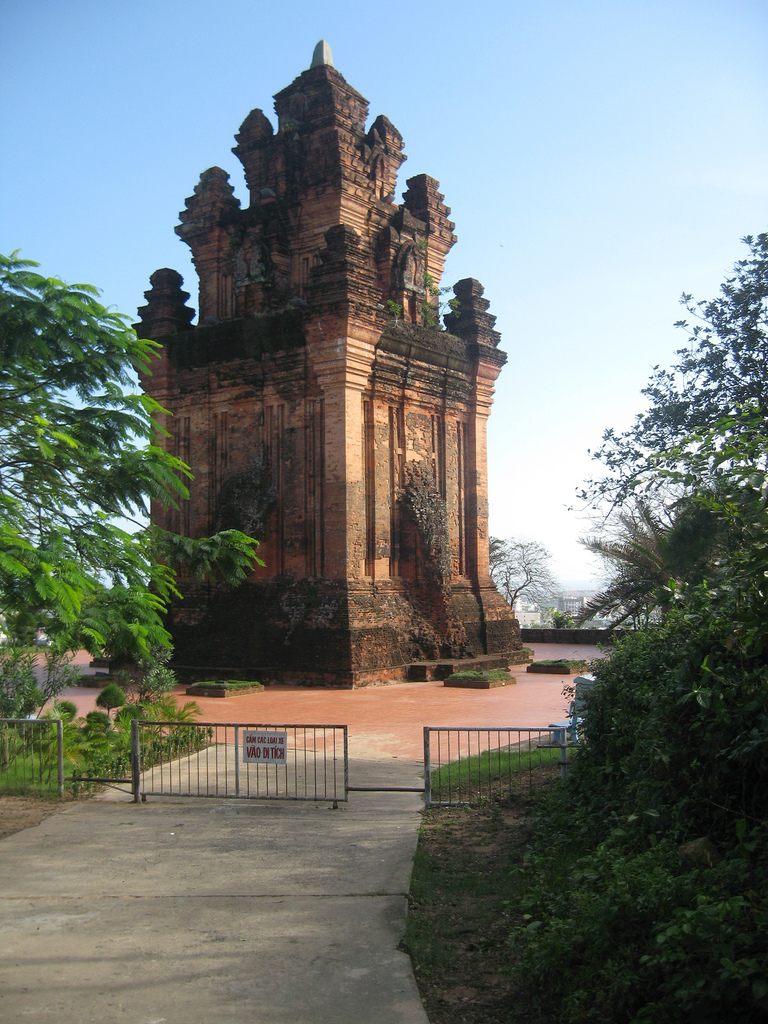
- Điện Beach • Tuy Hòa Beach • Đà Rằng River • Dài Beach • Đá Bia Mountain • Đá Dĩa Beach • Đá Hòa Thắng Mountain • Coral Phú Yên • Long Thủy Beach • Vũng Rô Bay • Ganh Da Dia • Nhạn Tower

- Location of Phú Yên within Vietnam
- Coordinates: 13°10′N 109°10′E
- Country: Vietnam
- Region: South Central Coast
- Capital: Tuy Hòa

Government
  - People's Council Chair: Trần Hữu Thế
  - People's Committee Chair: Cao Thị Hòa An

Area
  - Total: 5,025.99 km^{2} (1,940.55 sq mi)

Population (2025)
  - Total: 1,054,350
  - Density: 209.780/km^{2} (543.327/sq mi)

Demographics
  - Ethnicities: Vietnamese, Chăm, Ê Đê, Ba Na

GDP
  - Total: VND 36.352 trillion US$1.579 billion
- Time zone: UTC+7 (ICT)
- Calling code: 57
- ISO 3166 code: VN-32
- HDI (2020): ▲0.699 (37th)
- Website: www.phuyen.gov.vn

Phú Yên was a former central coastal province in the South Central Coast region of Central Vietnam. It borders Bình Định to the north, Khánh Hòa to the south, Gia Lai to the northwest, Đắk Lắk to the southwest and the South China Sea to the east.

On June 12, 2025, Phú Yên was merged into Đắk Lắk province.

== History ==
Phú Yên formerly belonged to Champa territory as Ayaru, a part of Kauthara polity.

In 1611, Nguyễn Hoàng sent his general Văn Phong to attack Ayaru. Champa failed and Nguyễn Hoàng annexed Ayaru into Đàng Trong and named Phú Yên (which means a prosperous and peaceful) prefecture organized into two districts: Đồng Xuân and Tuy Hòa. The region became an important frontier province during the southward expansion of the Nguyễn lords, with increasing Vietnamese settlement and agricultural development.

During the late 18th century, Phú Yên was affected by the conflicts between the Tây Sơn movement and Nguyễn forces. Under the Nguyễn dynasty, the area was organised as a provincial administrative unit.

During the French colonial period, Phú Yên formed part of French Indochina and developed as a coastal agricultural and trading region.

== Geography ==
Phú Yên province contains two passes: Cù Mông Pass in the north and Cả Pass in the south.

The province's topography consists of hilly regions in the west (70%) and the fertile plain of Tuy Hòa in the east. Lowlands also extend west along Đà Rằng River. The highest peaks are at 1,592 m on the border of Khánh Hòa province in the south and at 1,331 m in the northwest (Đồng Xuân District). There are several hills near the coast, including Mô Cheo (Núi Mô Cheo, 814 m) in Sông Cầu and Đá Bia (Núi Đá Bia, 706 m) near Đại Lãnh in Đông Hòa District.

The main rivers that flow across Phú Yên are the Đà Rằng River (the largest river in Central Vietnam), Bàn Thạch River and Kỳ Lộ River. Sông Hinh Lake, a large artificial lake, is located in the southwest of the province.

Phú Yên has various picturesque landscapes, such as the Ô Loan Lagoon, Sông Cầu coconut ranges, Đá Bia, Nghinh Phong Tower and Nhạn mountains, Bãi Môn, Rô Bay, Xep Beach, and Long Thủy Beach.

The beautiful nature of Phú Yên has been used for the movie Yellow Flowers on the Green Grass, which is adapted from the same novel by Nguyễn Nhật Ánh.

== Administrative divisions ==
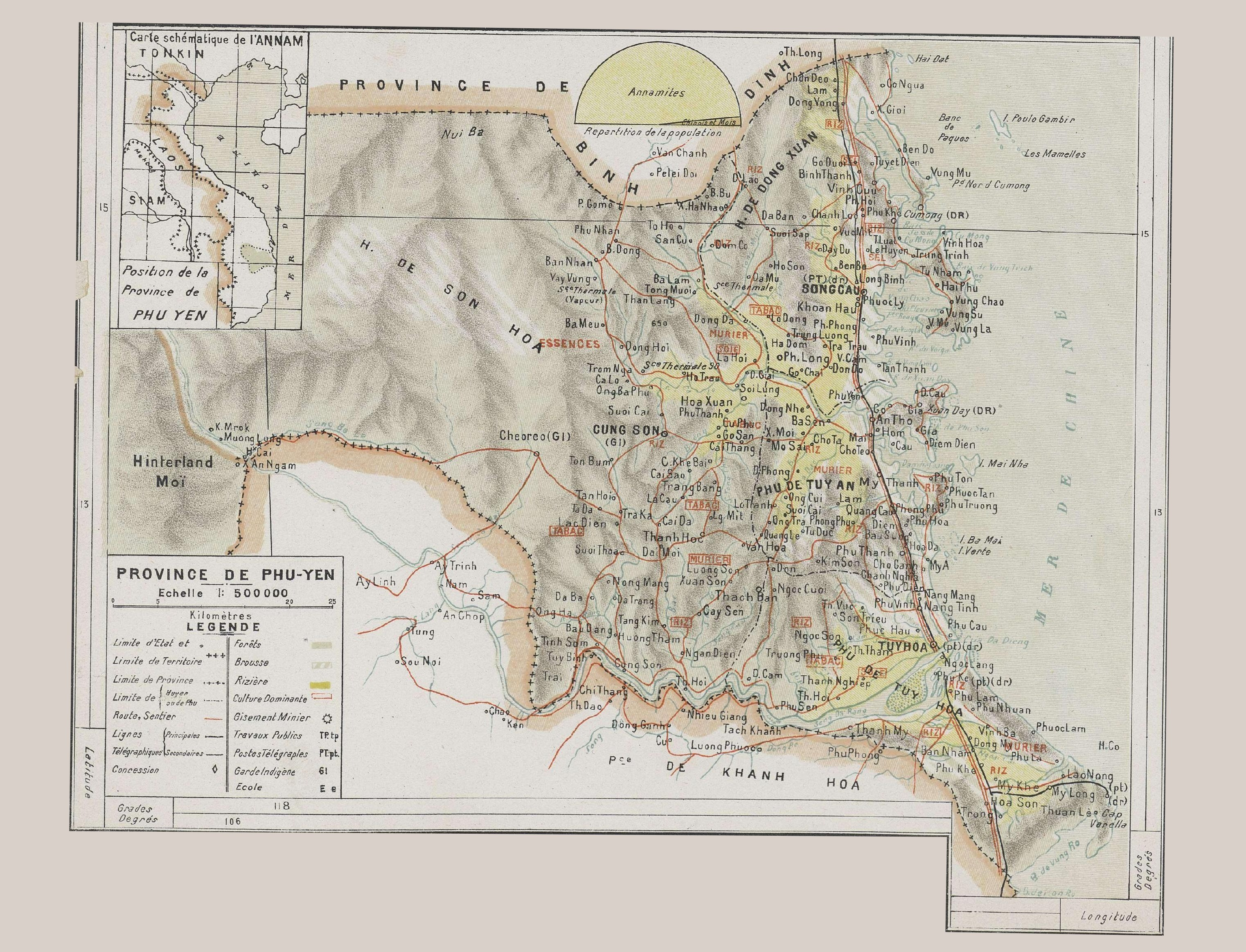
Map of Phu Yen province in 1909

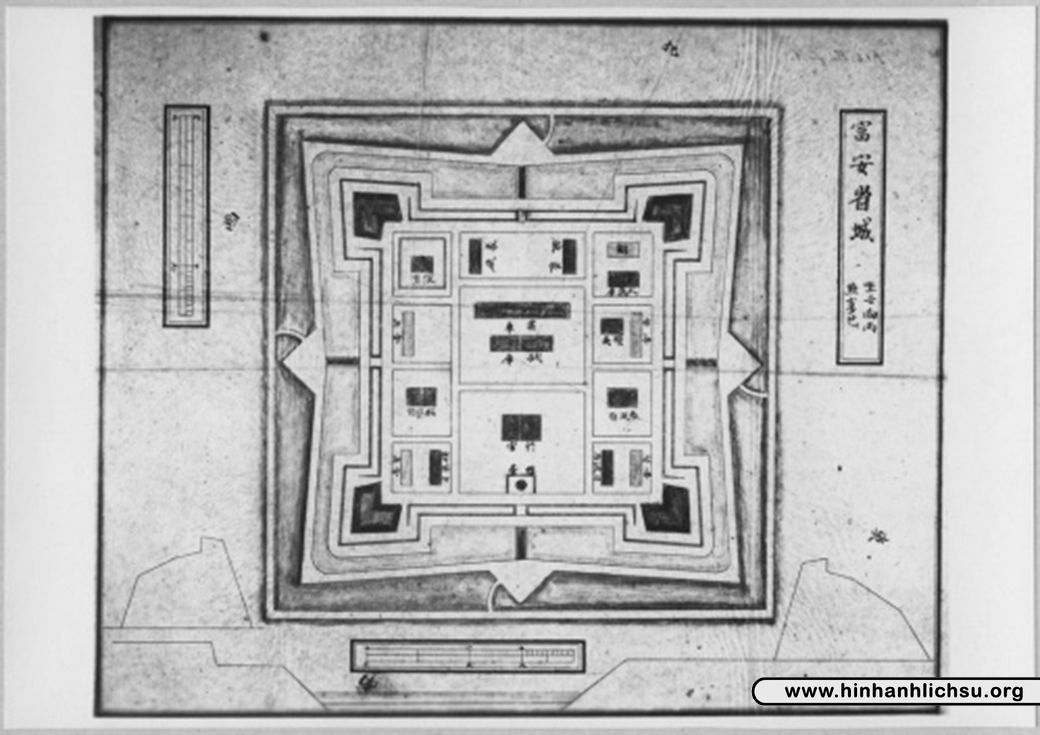
Drawing of Phú Yên citadel in the Nguyễn dynasty

Phú Yên is subdivided into nine district-level sub-divisions:

- 6 districts:

- Đồng Xuân
- Phú Hòa
- Sơn Hòa
- Sông Hinh
- Tây Hòa
- Tuy An

- 2 district-level towns:
  - Đông Hòa
  - Sông Cầu
- 1 provincial city:
  - Tuy Hòa (capital)

They are further subdivided into eight commune-level towns (or townlets), 88 communes, and 16 wards.

== Demography ==
As of 2007 Phú Yên has a population of 880,700. It has a relatively small urban population (178,600), making up 20% of the province's population. With 174 people per square kilometer, it is also one of the least densely populated provinces of the South Central Coast. Population density is relatively high (exceeding 500/km^{2}) along the lower Đà Rằng River, but is lower than 50/km^{2} in much of the western part of the province. Average yearly population growth between 2000 and 2007 has been 1.3%, close to the regional average. Urban population growth has been faster with 2.2% per year on average.

The vast majority of the population is ethnic Kinh. There are also minorities of Cham, E De, and Ba Na people. Significant minorities of Cham live in Đồng Xuân District and Sơn Hòa District and E De people in Sông Hinh District and Sơn Hòa District. Much smaller communities of Ba Na people also live in these three districts.

The province has a tropical monsoon climate, characterized by hot and humid conditions and influenced by the oceanic climate. It experiences two distinct seasons: a rainy season from September to December and a dry season from January to August. The average annual temperature is 26.5 °C, and average annual rainfall is approximately 1,600–1,700 mm.

== Ethnic groups ==
- Kinh: 812,830
- Tay: 2,349
- Thai: 298
- Hoa: 171
- Khmer: 59
- Muong: 231
- Nung: 2,283
- Mong: 192
- Dao: 1,031
- Gia Rai: 368
- Ngai: 2
- E De: 25,225
- Ba Na: 4,680
- Xo Dang: 4
- San Chay: 27
- Co Ho: 14
- Cham: 22,813
- San Diu: 50
- Hre: 164
- Mnong: 9
- Raglay: 50
- Xtieng: 9
- Bru Van Kieu: –
- Tho: 44
- Giay: –
- Co Tu: 1
- Gie Trieng: 3
- Ma: 1
- Kho Mu: 10
- Co: 1
- Ta Oi: 4
- Cho Ro: 7
- Khang: –
- Xinh Mun: –
- Ha Nhi: –
- Chu Ru: 3
- Lao: 12
- La Chi: –
- La Ha: –
- Phu La: –
- La Hu: –
- Lu: –
- Lo Lo: –
- Chut: –
- Mang: –
- Pa Then: –
- Co Lao: –
- Cong: –
- Bo Y: –
- Si La: 1
- Pu Peo: –
- Brau: –
- O Du: –
- Ro Mam: –
- Nguoi Nuoc Ngoai: 6
- Khong Xac Dinh: 12

== Economy ==
With a GDP per capita of 8.43 million VND in 2007 and a relatively small industrial sector, Phú Yên is one of the less developed provinces of the South Central Coast.

Phú Yên has had a trade deficit. In 2007, it exported goods worth US$72.7 million while importing goods worth US$116.25 million, mainly fuel, raw materials, machinery, and medical goods.

Total employment was at 482,800 in 2007. The vast majority (361,400) are still employed in agriculture, forestry, and fishing. 45,600 people were employed in industry and construction and 75,800 in the service sector. Both industry and service have shown little employment growth between 2005 and 2007. Service employment has actually declined significantly since 2000.

=== Agriculture, forestry and fishing ===
The main agricultural regions of the province are the plains around Tuy Hòa and the lowlands along the Đà Rằng River. In 2007 the rice harvest was 321,800 t. It is the South Central Coast's largest producer of sugar-cane with a harvest of 1.051 million t (6% of Vietnam's total harvest). Cultivation of cotton and tobacco is also significant, with 800 t (5% of the national total) and 700 t (2.2%) respectively. Other crops include peanuts, cashew nuts, pepper, and coffee.

Phú Yên has a relatively large fishing sector. Its gross output is the third largest in the South Central Coast after Khánh Hòa province and Bình Định province. Aquaculture, mostly shrimp farms, make up around one third of the fishing output, while using 2300 ha.

=== Industry ===
Phú Yên is one of the less industrialized provinces of the South Central Coast. Its industrial production is mostly based on the processing of local primary products such as fish, shrimp, cashew nuts and sugar. The province also produces mineral water, beer, garments, and cement. Industrial parks are located in the north of Tuy Hòa and Sông Cầu, near Qui Nhơn.

The province is zoning and developing a large economic zone, namely the Nam Phú Yên Economic Zone in southern Đông Hòa District. Upon completion, it will become an oil-refining hub in Vietnam and potentially provide high profits for the province.

== Infrastructure ==
=== Transport ===
National Route 1 as well as the North–South Railway run through the province. Phú Yên's main railway station is Tuy Hòa Railway Station. Smaller railway stations are located in Đồng Xuân District and Tuy An District north of Tuy Hòa. National Road 25 connects Tuy Hòa to Chư Sê in Gia Lai province, mostly along the Đà Rằng River.

Đông Tác Airport, a small domestic airport, is located south of Tuy Hòa.

The province has a port around 28 km south of Tuy Hòa, namely Vũng Rô Port (Vietnamese: Cảng Vũng Rô).

=== Energy ===
A hydropower plant is located in Sông Hinh District in the southwest of Phú Yên. It is built on the Hinh River, a major tributary of the Đà Rằng River and which created a lake of the same name (Sông Hinh Lake, meaning River Hinh Lake). Phú Yên produced 379.9 million kWh of electricity in 2007.
