= List of cities in Vietnam =

Locations of cities in Vietnam: (listed from west to east, then north to south) • Hà Nội • Bắc Ninh • Hải Phòng • Quảng Ninh • Huế • Đà Nẵng • Đồng Nai • Hồ Chí Minh City • Cần Thơ

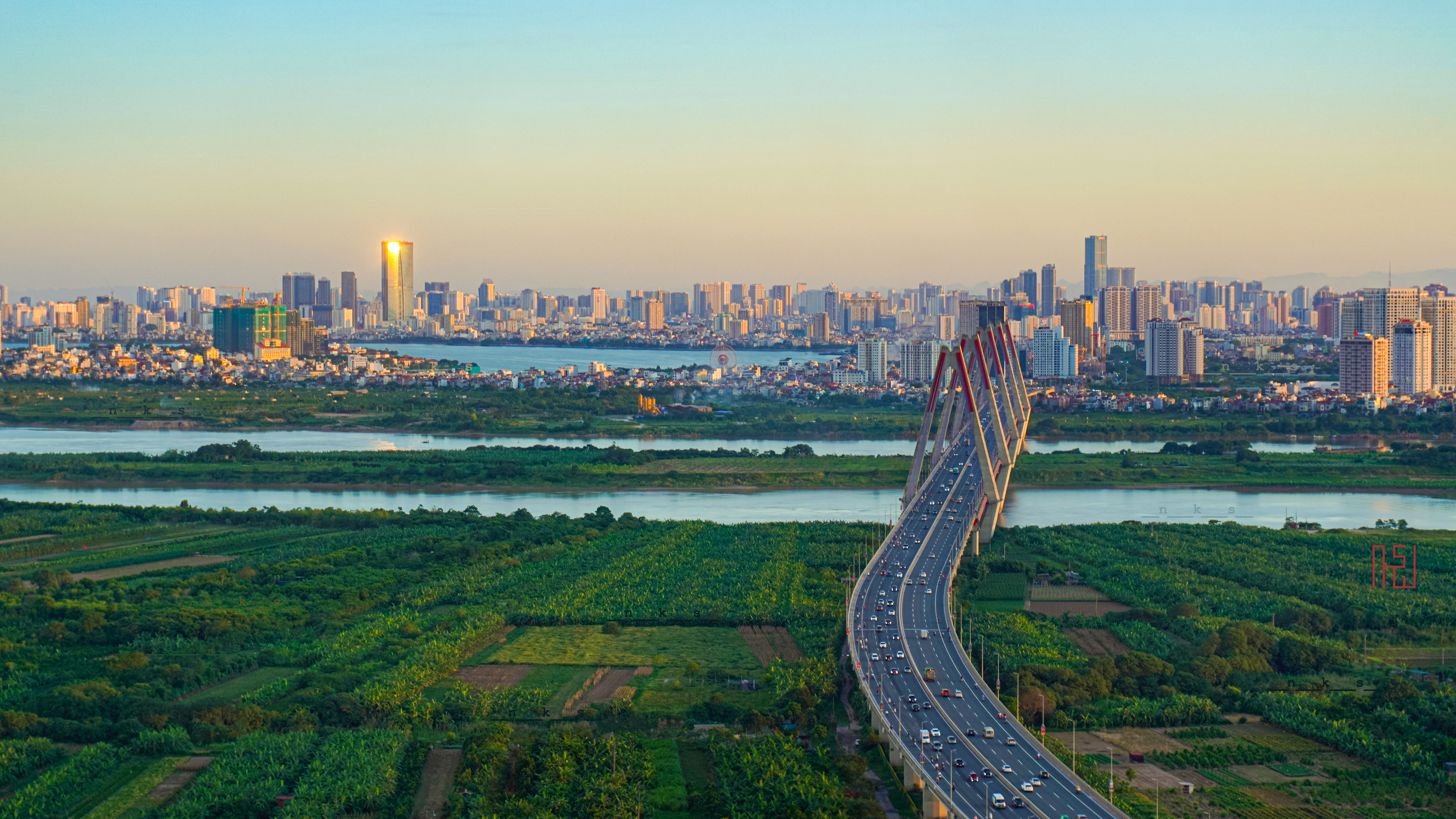
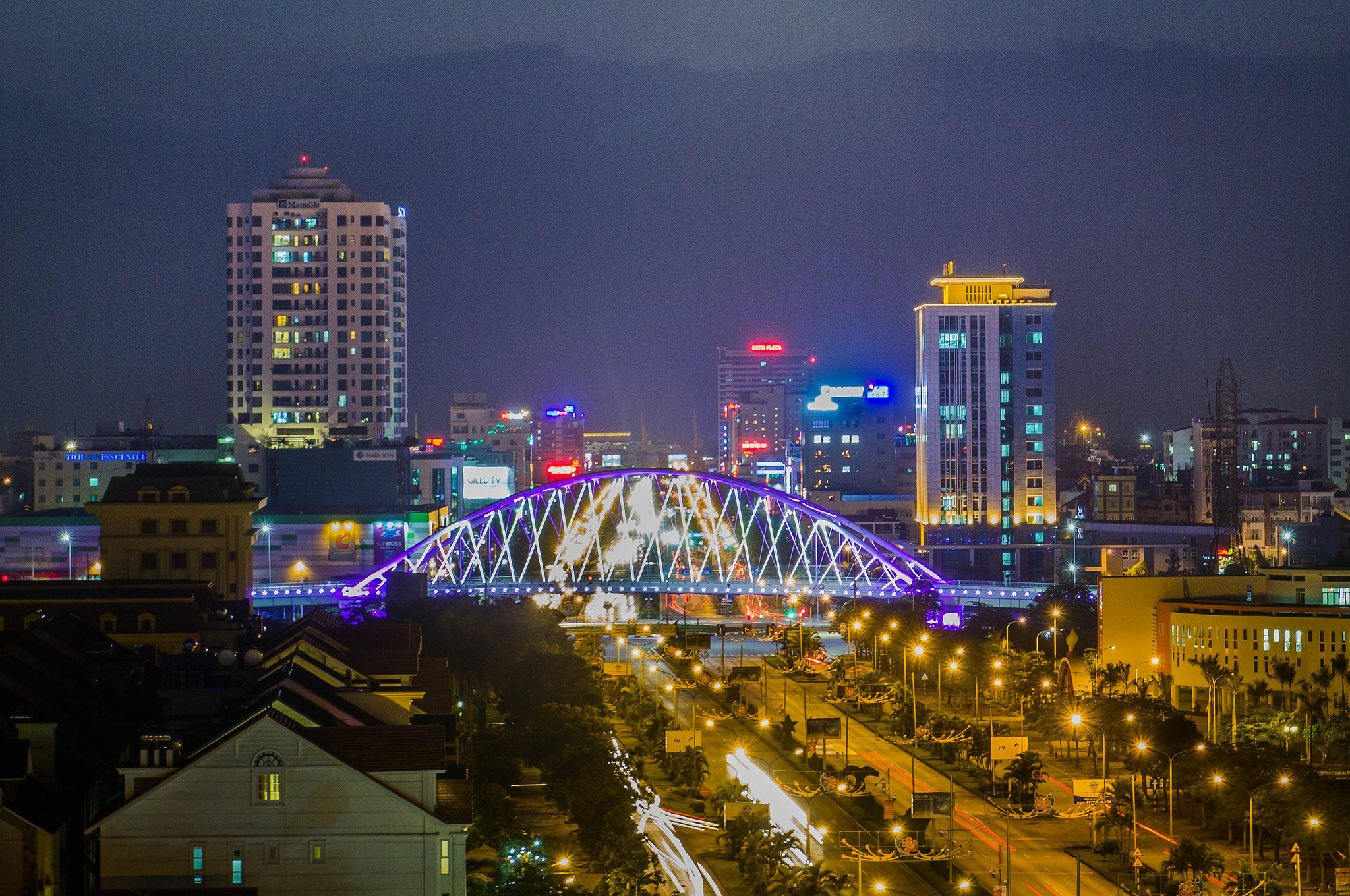
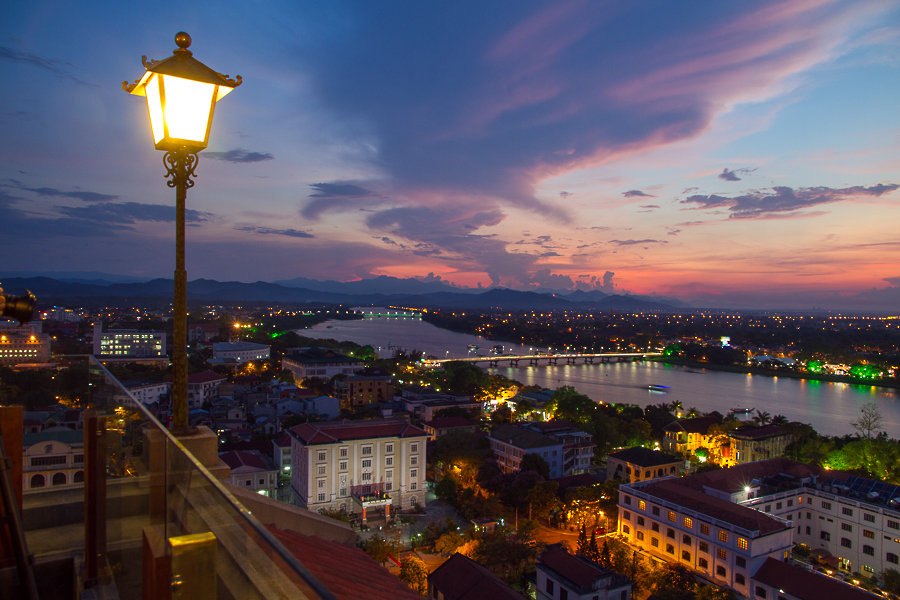
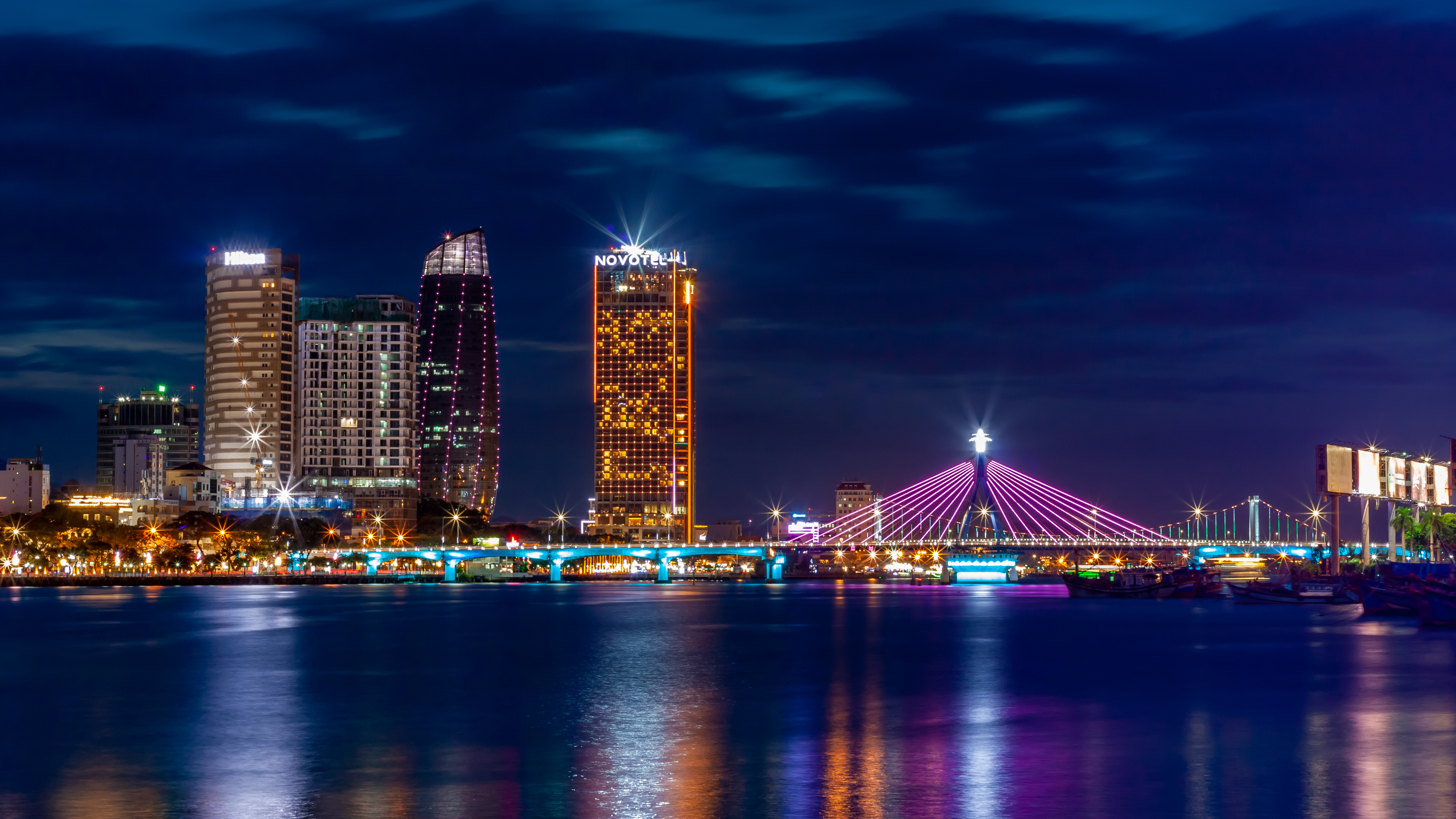
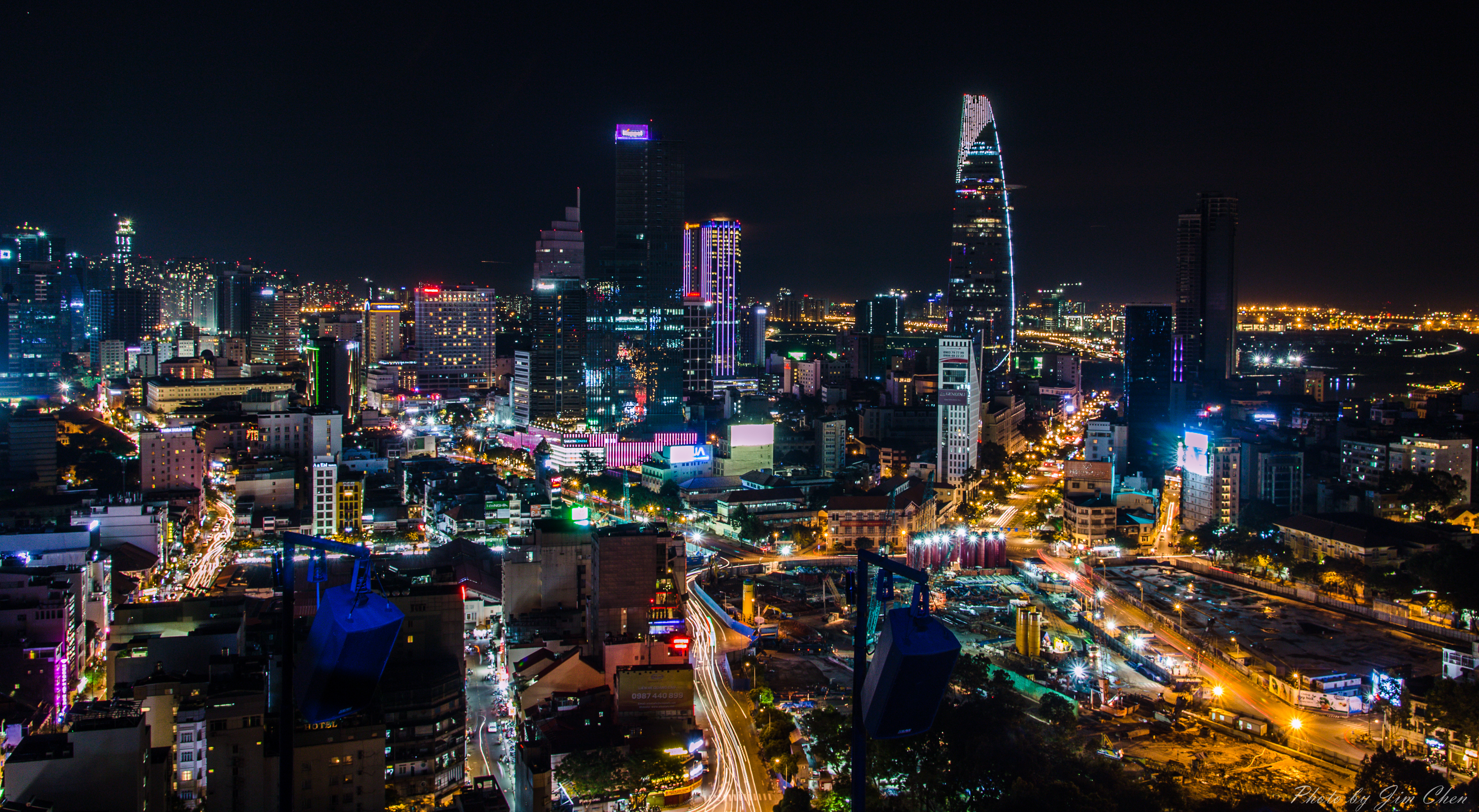
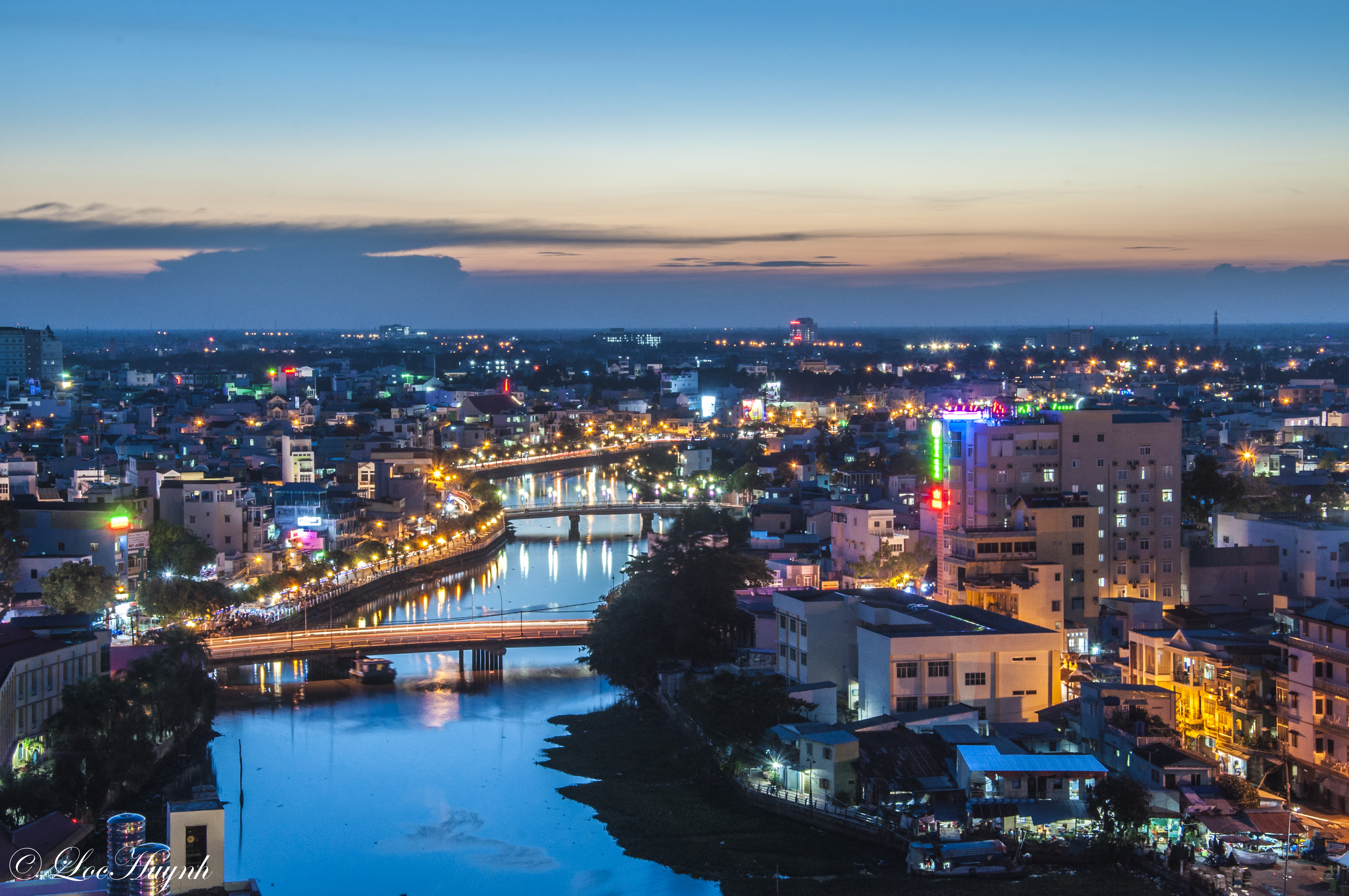
Skylines of Vietnamese cities

In Vietnam, cities (Vietnamese: thành phố) are a type of administrative division. Since the 2025 reforms to local government, cities only exist as first-level administrative divisions, equivalent to a province and fully designated as the centrally-governed cities (Vietnamese: thành phố trực thuộc trung ương, lit. 'city directly subordinate to the centre (central government)'). City status requires a resolution of the National Assembly of Vietnam. As with provinces, they are divided into urban wards, rural communes, and, where appropriate, island special zones.

Prior to 2025, cities also existed at the district level, and may be subject to the administration of a province or of a centrally-governed city.

== Prior to 2025 reforms ==
Prior to the amendment of the Constitution on June 16, 2025, Vietnamese cities were divided into 2 main administrative types: centrally-governed cities (thành phố trực thuộc trung ương) and provincial cities (thành phố trực thuộc tỉnh). Municipal cities were considered district-level administrative units within the municipalities.

Cities were further assessed and categorized under the urban area classification resolution, which includes six classes: Special (Vietnamese: Loại đặc biệt), Class I, Class II, Class III, Class IV and Class V. Municipalities and Municipal Cities were given Class I (With the exception of Hanoi and Ho Chi Minh City being Special Class). Provincial Cities were assigned Class I, Class II, Class III depending on classification criteria.

== After 2025 reforms ==
After the amendment of the Constitution, centrally-governed cities became the only administrative units defined as 'cities.' The amendment resulted in the dissolution of provincial cities, which rendered the urban area classification resolution outdated. On August 23, 2025, the Ministry of Construction published a draft resolution, aimed at addressing the problem, for public opinion gathering.

== Current centrally-governed cities ==
Capital city

City	Vietnamese	Seal	Year of recognition	Region	2025 Area		2025 Population
City	Vietnamese	Seal	Year of recognition	Region	km^{2}	mi^{2}	2025 Population
Hanoi	Hà Nội		1946	Red River Delta	3.359,82	1,297.23	8.807.523
Ho Chi Minh City	Thành phố Hồ Chí Minh		1976	Southeast	6.772,59	2,614.91	14.002.598
Haiphong	Hải Phòng		1976	Red River Delta	3.194,72	1,233.48	4.664.124
Can Tho	Cần Thơ		2004	Mekong River Delta	6.360,83	2,455.93	4.199.824
Da Nang	Đà Nẵng		1997	South Central Coast	11.859,59	4,579.01	3.065.628
Hue	Huế		2025	North Central Coast	4.947,11	1,910.09	1.432.986
Dong Nai	Đồng Nai		2026	Southeast	12.737,18	4,917.85	4.491.408
Quang Ninh	Quảng Ninh		2026	Half Red River Delta, half Northeast (Note: After the 2025 reforms, Quảng Ninh province is no longer considered part of the Northeast region but instead incorporated into the Red River Delta; geographically it remains straddled across both regions.)	6.231,27		1.497.447
Bac Ninh	Bắc Ninh		2026	Red River Delta	4.713,75	1,819.98	3.989.623

== Future centrally-governed city status ==
=== Provinces with central party or government designation ===
- Khánh Hòa (target date 2030)
- Ninh Bình (target date 2030)
- Hưng Yên (target date 2030)

=== Provinces with local government aspiration ===
- Tây Ninh (no target date specified)
- Thái Nguyên (target date 2030)
- Thanh Hoá (target date after 2030)

== Former cities ==
=== Municipalities ===
City	Vietnamese	Region	Established	Dissolved	Status
Nam Dinh	Nam Định	Red River Delta	1945	1957	Merged into Nam Định province.

=== Municipal cities ===
City	Vietnamese	Municipality	Established	Dissolved	Status
Thu Duc	Thủ Đức	Ho Chi Minh City	2020	2025	Merged into Ho Chi Minh City.
Thuy Nguyen	Thủy Nguyên	Haiphong	2025	2025	Merged into Haiphong.

=== Provincial cities ===
City	Vietnamese	Province	Established	Dissolved	Status
Can Tho	Cần Thơ	Cần Thơ	1972	2004	Elevated to municipality.
Da Nang	Đà Nẵng	Quảng Nam–Đà Nẵng	1978	1997	Elevated to municipality.
Ha Dong	Hà Đông	Hà Tây	2006	2009	Merged into Hanoi.
Hue	Huế	Thừa Thiên Huế	1929	2025	Elevated to municipality.
Son Tay	Sơn Tây	Hà Tây	2007	2009	Merged into Hanoi.
Ninh Binh	Ninh Bình	Ninh Bình	2007	2025	Merged with Hoa Lư district to become Hoa Lư city.
Ba Ria	Bà Rịa	Bà Rịa–Vũng Tàu	2012	2025	Reorganized into smaller subdivisions.
Bac Lieu	Bạc Liêu	Bạc Liêu	2010	2025	Reorganized into smaller subdivisions.
Bao Loc	Bảo Lộc	Lâm Đồng	2010	2025	Reorganized into smaller subdivisions.
Bac Giang	Bắc Giang	Bắc Giang	2005	2025	Reorganized into smaller subdivisions.
Bac Kan	Bắc Kạn	Bắc Kạn	2015	2025	Reorganized into smaller subdivisions.
Bac Ninh	Bắc Ninh	Bắc Ninh	2006	2025	Reorganized into smaller subdivisions.
Bien Hoa	Biên Hòa	Đồng Nai	1976	2025	Reorganized into smaller subdivisions.
Ben Cat	Bến Cát	Bình Dương	2024	2025	Reorganized into smaller subdivisions.
Ben Tre	Bến Tre	Bến Tre	2009	2025	Reorganized into smaller subdivisions.
Buon Ma Thuot	Buôn Ma Thuột	Đắk Lắk	1995	2025	Reorganized into smaller subdivisions.
Cam Ranh	Cam Ranh	Khánh Hòa	2010	2025	Reorganized into smaller subdivisions.
Cao Bang	Cao Bằng	Cao Bằng	2012	2025	Reorganized into smaller subdivisions.
Cao Lanh	Cao Lãnh	Đồng Tháp	2007	2025	Reorganized into smaller subdivisions.
Ca Mau	Cà Mau	Cà Mau	1999	2025	Reorganized into smaller subdivisions.
Cam Pha	Cẩm Phả	Quảng Ninh	2012	2025	Reorganized into smaller subdivisions.
Chau Doc	Châu Đốc	An Giang	2013	2025	Reorganized into smaller subdivisions.
Chi Linh	Chí Linh	Hải Dương	2019	2025	Reorganized into smaller subdivisions.
Di An	Dĩ An	Bình Dương	2020	2025	Reorganized into smaller subdivisions.
Da Lat	Đà Lạt	Lâm Đồng	1893	2025	Reorganized into smaller subdivisions.
Dien Bien Phu	Điện Biên Phủ	Điện Biên	2003	2025	Reorganized into smaller subdivisions.
Dong Ha	Đông Hà	Quảng Trị	2009	2025	Reorganized into smaller subdivisions.
Dong Trieu	Đông Triều	Quảng Ninh	2024	2025	Reorganized into smaller subdivisions.
Dong Hoi	Đồng Hới	Quảng Bình	2004	2025	Reorganized into smaller subdivisions.
Dong Xoai	Đồng Xoài	Bình Phước	2018	2025	Reorganized into smaller subdivisions.
Go Cong	Gò Công	Tiền Giang	2024	2025	Reorganized into smaller subdivisions.
Gia Nghia	Gia Nghĩa	Đăk Nông	2019	2025	Reorganized into smaller subdivisions.
Ha Giang	Hà Giang	Hà Giang	2010	2025	Reorganized into smaller subdivisions.
Ha Tien	Hà Tiên	Kiên Giang	2018	2025	Reorganized into smaller subdivisions.
Ha Tinh	Hà Tĩnh	Hà Tĩnh	2007	2025	Reorganized into smaller subdivisions.
Ha Long	Hạ Long	Quảng Ninh	1993	2025	Reorganized into smaller subdivisions.
Hai Duong	Hải Dương	Hải Dương	1997	2025	Reorganized into smaller subdivisions.
Hoa Binh	Hòa Bình	Hòa Bình	2006	2025	Reorganized into smaller subdivisions.
Hoa Lu	Hoa Lư	Ninh Bình	2007	2025	Reorganized into smaller subdivisions.
Hoi An	Hội An	Quảng Nam	2008	2025	Reorganized into smaller subdivisions.
Hong Ngu	Hồng Ngự	Đồng Tháp	2020	2025	Reorganized into smaller subdivisions.
Hung Yen	Hưng Yên	Hưng Yên	2009	2025	Reorganized into smaller subdivisions.
Kon Tum	Kon Tum	Kon Tum	2009	2025	Reorganized into smaller subdivisions.
Lai Chau	Lai Châu	Lai Châu	2013	2025	Reorganized into smaller subdivisions.
Lang Son	Lạng Sơn	Lạng Sơn	2002	2025	Reorganized into smaller subdivisions.
Lao Cai	Lào Cai	Lào Cai	2004	2025	Reorganized into smaller subdivisions.
Long Khanh	Long Khánh	Đồng Nai	2019	2025	Reorganized into smaller subdivisions.
Long Xuyen	Long Xuyên	An Giang	1999	2025	Reorganized into smaller subdivisions.
Mong Cai	Móng Cái	Quảng Ninh	2008	2025	Reorganized into smaller subdivisions.
My Tho	Mỹ Tho	Tiền Giang	1967	2025	Reorganized into smaller subdivisions.
Nam Dinh	Nam Định	Nam Định	1921	2025	Reorganized into smaller subdivisions.
Nga Bay	Ngã Bảy	Hậu Giang	2020	2025	Reorganized into smaller subdivisions.
Nha Trang	Nha Trang	Khánh Hòa	1977	2025	Reorganized into smaller subdivisions.
Phan Rang–Thap Cham	Phan Rang–Tháp Chàm	Ninh Thuận	2007	2025	Reorganized into smaller subdivisions.
Phan Thiet	Phan Thiết	Bình Thuận	1999	2025	Reorganized into smaller subdivisions.
Pho Yen	Phổ Yên	Thái Nguyên	2022	2025	Reorganized into smaller subdivisions.
Phu Ly	Phủ Lý	Hà Nam	2008	2025	Reorganized into smaller subdivisions.
Phu My	Phú Mỹ	Bà Rịa–Vũng Tàu	2025	2025	Reorganized into smaller subdivisions.
Phu Quoc	Phú Quốc	Kiên Giang	2020	2025	Reorganized into smaller subdivisions.
Phuc Yen	Phúc Yên	Vĩnh Phúc	2018	2025	Reorganized into smaller subdivisions.
Pleiku	Pleiku	Gia Lai	1999	2025	Reorganized into smaller subdivisions.
Quang Ngai	Quảng Ngãi	Quảng Ngãi	2005	2025	Reorganized into smaller subdivisions.
Quy Nhon	Quy Nhơn	Bình Định	1986	2025	Reorganized into smaller subdivisions.
Rach Gia	Rạch Giá	Kiên Giang	2005	2025	Reorganized into smaller subdivisions.
Sa Dec	Sa Đéc	Đồng Tháp	2013	2025	Reorganized into smaller subdivisions.
Sam Son	Sầm Sơn	Thanh Hóa	2017	2025	Reorganized into smaller subdivisions.
Soc Trang	Sóc Trăng	Sóc Trăng	2007	2025	Reorganized into smaller subdivisions.
Son La	Sơn La	Sơn La	2008	2025	Reorganized into smaller subdivisions.
Song Cong	Sông Công	Thái Nguyên	2015	2025	Reorganized into smaller subdivisions.
Tam Diep	Tam Điệp	Ninh Bình	2015	2025	Reorganized into smaller subdivisions.
Tam Ky	Tam Kỳ	Quảng Nam	2006	2025	Reorganized into smaller subdivisions.
Tan An	Tân An	Long An	2009	2025	Reorganized into smaller subdivisions.
Tan Uyen	Tân Uyên	Bình Dương	2023	2025	Reorganized into smaller subdivisions.
Tay Ninh	Tây Ninh	Tây Ninh	2013	2025	Reorganized into smaller subdivisions.
Thai Binh	Thái Bình	Thái Bình	2004	2025	Reorganized into smaller subdivisions.
Thai Nguyen	Thái Nguyên	Thái Nguyên	1962	2025	Reorganized into smaller subdivisions.
Thanh Hoa	Thanh Hóa	Thanh Hóa	1994	2025	Reorganized into smaller subdivisions.
Thu Dau Mot	Thủ Dầu Một	Bình Dương	2012	2025	Reorganized into smaller subdivisions.
Thuan An	Thuận An	Bình Dương	2020	2025	Reorganized into smaller subdivisions.
Tra Vinh	Trà Vinh	Trà Vinh	2010	2025	Reorganized into smaller subdivisions.
Tuy Hoa	Tuy Hòa	Phú Yên	2005	2025	Reorganized into smaller subdivisions.
Tuyen Quang	Tuyên Quang	Tuyên Quang	2010	2025	Reorganized into smaller subdivisions.
Tu Son	Từ Sơn	Bắc Ninh	2021	2025	Reorganized into smaller subdivisions.
Uong Bi	Uông Bí	Quảng Ninh	2011	2025	Reorganized into smaller subdivisions.
Vi Thanh	Vị Thanh	Hậu Giang	2010	2025	Reorganized into smaller subdivisions.
Viet Tri	Việt Trì	Phú Thọ	1962	2025	Reorganized into smaller subdivisions.
Vinh	Vinh	Nghệ An	1927	2025	Reorganized into smaller subdivisions.
Vinh Long	Vĩnh Long	Vĩnh Long	2009	2025	Reorganized into smaller subdivisions.
Vinh Yen	Vĩnh Yên	Vĩnh Phúc	2006	2025	Reorganized into smaller subdivisions.
Vung Tau	Vũng Tàu	Bà Rịa–Vũng Tàu	1991	2025	Reorganized into smaller subdivisions.
Yen Bai	Yên Bái	Yên Bái	2002	2025	Reorganized into smaller subdivisions.

== See also ==
- Commune (Vietnam)
- Special zone (Vietnam)
- Urban area of Vietnam
- Ward (Vietnam)
