= Uông Bí =

- Ba Vàng Pagoda

- Nickname(s): Land of Electricity and Coal
- Interactive map of Uông Bí
- Coordinates: 21.035527129947237°N 106.76467434658345°E
- Country: Vietnam
- City: Quảng Ninh
- Region: Red River Delta
- Established: 16 June 2025

Area
  - Total: 49.81 km^{2} (19.23 sq mi)

Population (2025)
  - Total: 59,866
  - Density: 1,201/km^{2} (3,110/sq mi)

Uông Bí is a ward of Quảng Ninh, Vietnam. The ward inherited its name from the former Uông Bí City in Quảng Ninh Province.

== History ==
The area of present-day Uông Bí Ward formerly belonged to Uông Bí City, formerly Quảng Ninh Province.

On 16 June 2025:

- The National Assembly adopted Resolution No. 203/2025/QH15 amending and supplementing several articles of the Constitution of the Socialist Republic of Vietnam. The resolution took effect on 16 June 2025. Under the resolution, district-level administrative units throughout Vietnam ceased to operate from 1 July 2025.
- The Standing Committee of the National Assembly of Vietnam adopted Resolution No. 1679/NQ-UBTVQH15 on the reorganization of commune-level administrative units in Quảng Ninh Province in 2025. The resolution took effect on 16 June 2025. Accordingly, the entire area and population of Quang Trung, Thanh Sơn, and Yên Thanh wards, together with part of Trưng Vương Ward, were merged to form a new ward named Uông Bí.

On 24 August 2026, the National Assembly adopted Resolution No. 36/2026/QH16 establishing Quảng Ninh City on the basis of the entire natural area and population of Quảng Ninh Province. The resolution took effect on 1 September 2026. Since then, Uông Bí Ward has been part of Quảng Ninh City.
