= Tuy Hòa (disambiguation) =

Tuy Hòa is a coastal ward in Đắk Lắk province, Vietnam. In addition, the name Tuy Hòa or Tuy Hoa may refer to the following:

- Tuy Hòa (city), a former provincial capital of Phú Yên province, Vietnam
- Tuy Hoa Airport, an airport located in Phú Yên ward, Đắk Lắk province
- Tuy Hoa Air Base, a US Air Force base in South Vietnam from 1966 to 1970
- Tuy Hòa station, a station of the Thống Nhất Railway
