= Minh Đức (disambiguation) =

Minh Đức may refer to several places in Vietnam, including:

- Minh Đức, a commune of Đồng Nai
- Minh Đức, Đồ Sơn, a former ward of Đồ Sơn district in Haiphong
- Minh Đức, Hưng Yên, a former ward of Mỹ Hào
- Minh Đức, Thủy Nguyên, a former township of Thủy Nguyên district in Haiphong
- Minh Đức, Hanoi, a former commune of Ứng Hòa district
- Minh Đức, Thái Nguyên, a former commune of Phổ Yên
- Minh Đức, Bến Tre, a former commune of Mỏ Cày Nam district
- Minh Đức, Hải Dương, a former commune of Tứ Kỳ district
- Minh Đức, Bắc Giang, a former commune of Việt Yên
