= Chí Linh, Haiphong =

Chí Linh Sept Pagodes
- Ward
- Interactive map of Chí Linh
- Coordinates: 21°06′21″N 106°18′58″E
- Country: Vietnam
- Province: Hải Phòng
- Time zone: UTC+07:00 (Indochina Time)
- Website: http://chilinh.haiphong.gov.vn/

Chí Linh is a ward (phường) of Hải Phòng, Vietnam. It was previously known by the French as the town of Sept Pagodes.

== Geography ==
Chí Linh Ward is geographically located as follows:

- To the east, it borders Chu Văn An ward and Hợp Tiến commune.
- To the west, it borders Bắc Ninh city, with the boundary formed by the Thái Bình River.
- To the south, it borders Hợp Tiến commune and Trần Phú commune, with the Kinh Thầy River serving as a natural boundary.
- To the north, it borders Trần Hưng Đạo ward.

== History ==
The area of present-day Chí Linh ward formerly belonged to Chí Linh city, Hải Dương province.

On 12 June 2025, the National Assembly promulgated Resolution No. 202/2025/QH15 on the reorganization of provincial-level administrative units. The resolution, which took effect on the same day, provided for the merger of Hải Dương province into Hải Phòng city. Accordingly, the area where Chí Linh ward was established became part of Hải Phòng city.

On 16 June 2025, the National Assembly Standing Committee promulgated a resolution on the reorganization of commune-level administrative units in Hải Phòng City in 2025. Under the resolution, the entire natural area and population of Phả Lại ward, Cổ Thành ward and Nhân Huệ commune were merged to form a new ward named Chí Linh ward.
