= Sầm Sơn =

- Ward
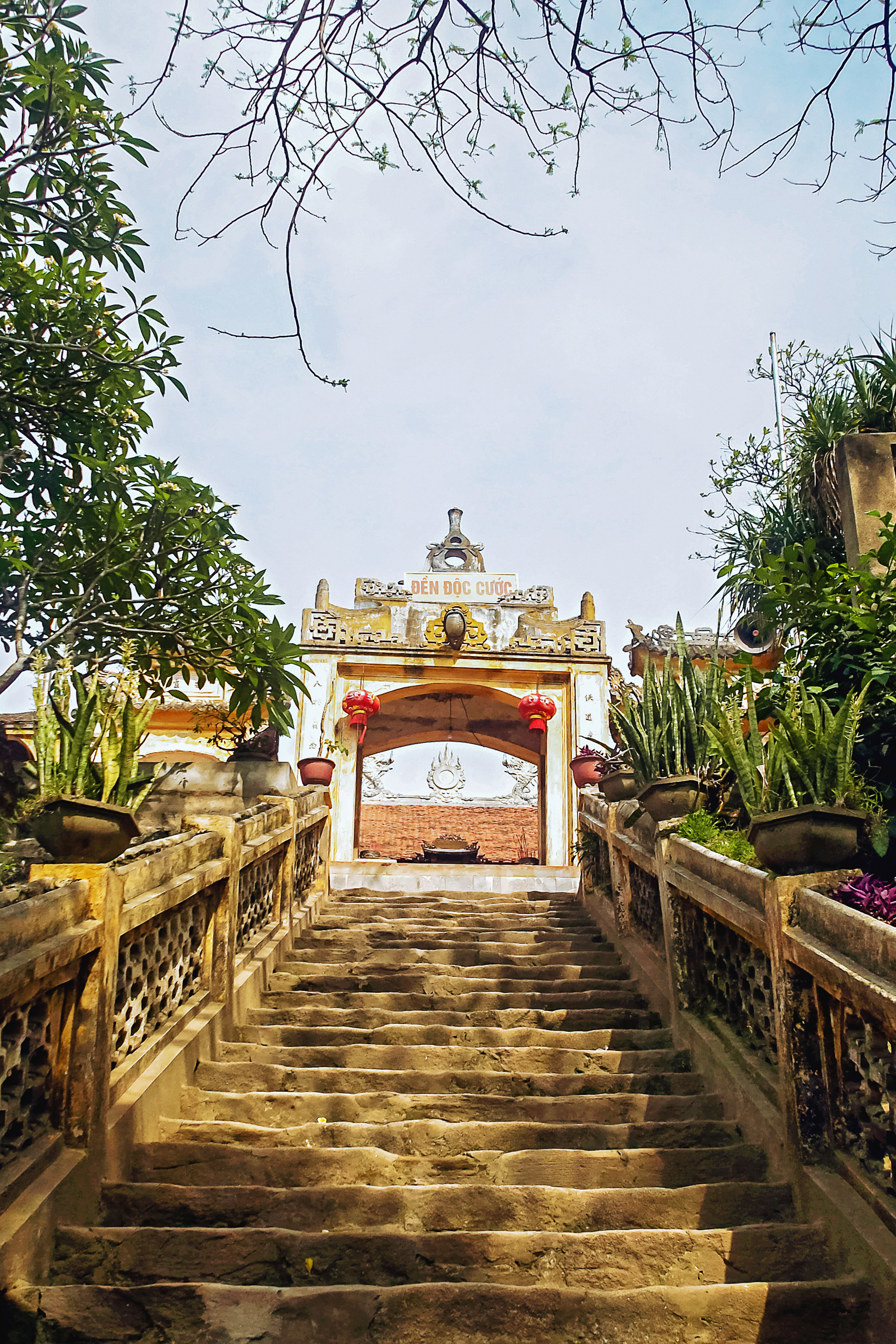
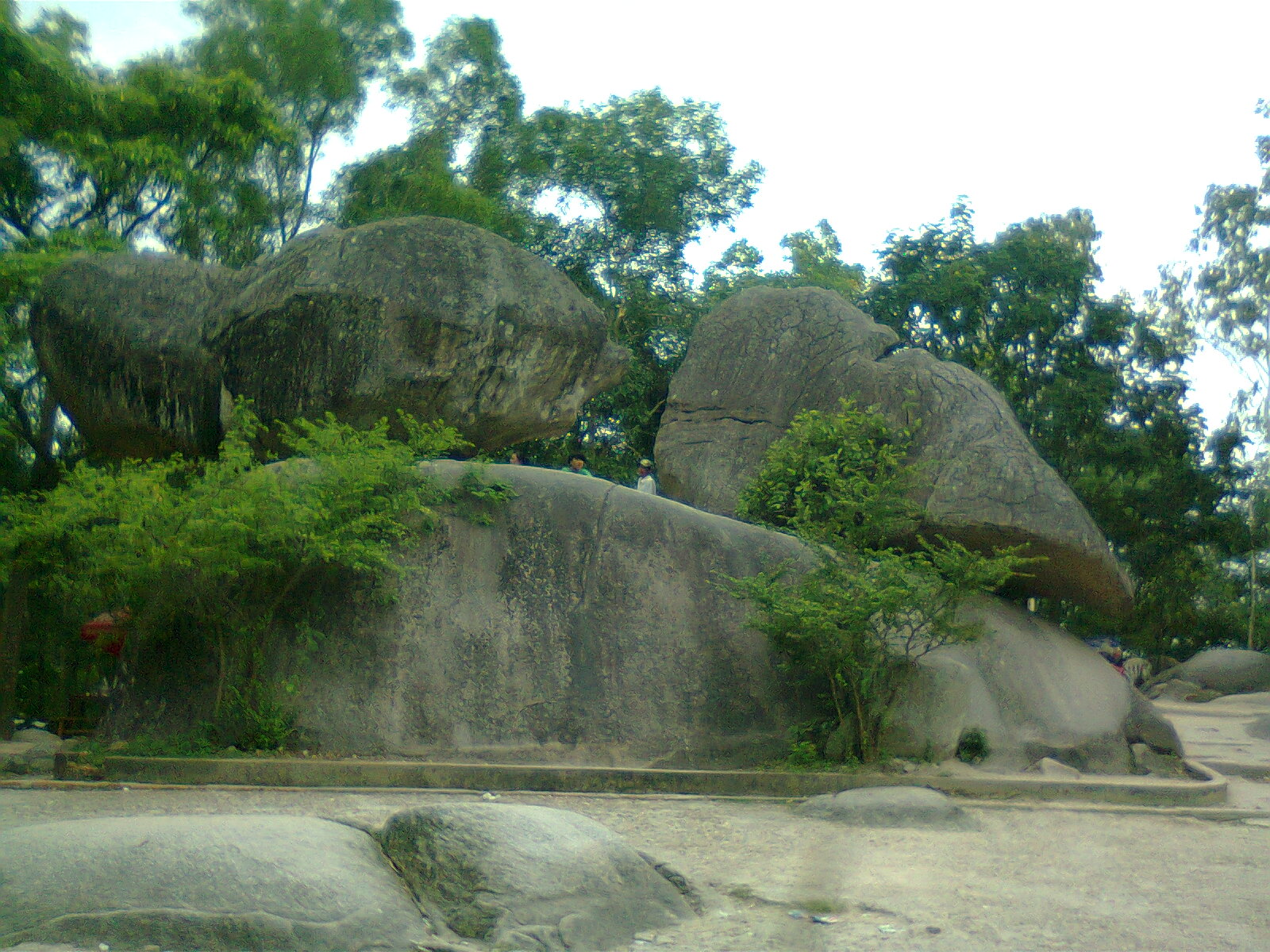
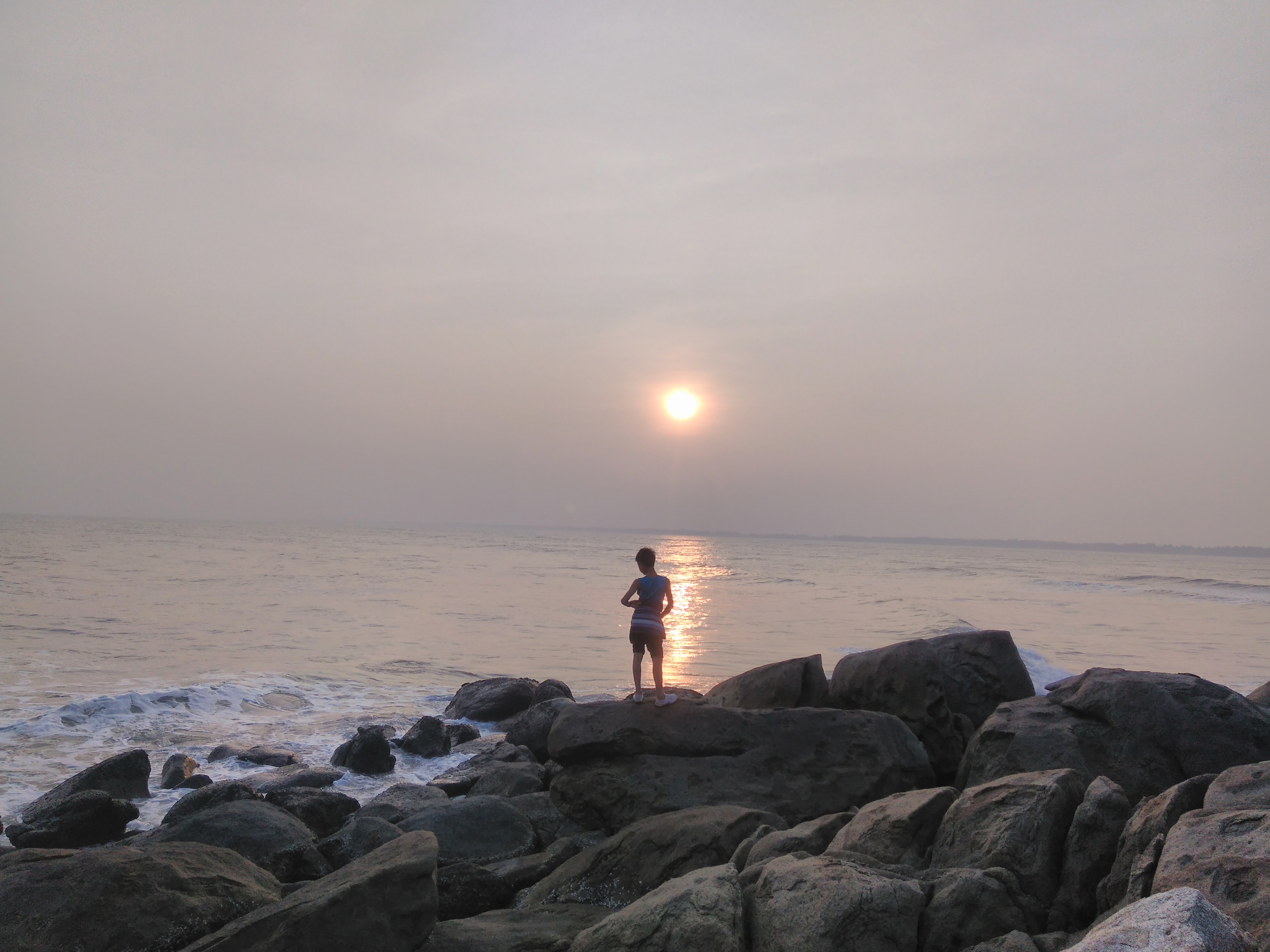
- Sầm Sơn Beach Độc Cước Temple Hòn Trống Mái Foot of Trường Lệ Mountain Sầm Sơn Church
- Interactive map of Sầm Sơn
- Coordinates: 19°45′30″N 105°52′36″E
- Country: Vietnam
- Region: North Central Coast
- Province: Thanh Hóa
- Established: 16 June 2025
- Administrative headquarters: 505 Lê Lợi Street

Area
  - Total: 30.29 km^{2} (11.70 sq mi)

Population (2024)
  - Total: 99,866
  - Density: 3,296/km^{2} (8,540/sq mi)
- Postal code: 40217
- Website: samson.thanhhoa.gov.vn

Sầm Sơn is a ward in Thanh Hóa province, Vietnam. The ward has an area of 30.29 km^{2} (11.70 sq mi) and a population of 99,866 as of 2024. It inherited its name from the former Sầm Sơn city.

On 16 June 2025, Sầm Sơn city was dissolved as part of the 2025 Vietnamese administrative reform, which abolished the district-level administrative system. Sầm Sơn Ward was established under Resolution No. 1686/NQ-UBTVQH15 of the Standing Committee of the National Assembly of Vietnam, through the merger of the entire area and population of seven wards formerly belonging to Sầm Sơn city: Bắc Sơn, Quảng Tiến, Quảng Cư, Trung Sơn, Trường Sơn, Quảng Châu, and Quảng Thọ.
