= Vạn Xuân, Thái Nguyên =

Vạn Xuân Phường Vạn Xuân
- Ward
- Vạn Xuân Roundabout
- Interactive map of Vạn Xuân
- Country: Vietnam
- Regions: Northeast
- Province: Thái Nguyên Province
- Established: June 16, 2025

Area
  - Total: 40.20 km^{2} (15.52 sq mi)

Population (2025)
  - Total: 61,610
  - Density: 1,533/km^{2} (3,969/sq mi)
- Time zone: UTC+07:00 (Indochina Time)

Vạn Xuân is a ward (phường) of Thái Nguyên Province, Vietnam.

== Geography ==
Vạn Xuân Ward located in southern Thái Nguyên Province, and adjacent to:

- Phổ Yên Ward and Điềm Thụy Commune to the north
- Trung Thành Ward and Bắc Ninh City to the south
- Phổ Yên Ward and Thành Công Commune to the west
- Điềm Thụy Commune and Bắc Ninh City to the east.

== History ==
On June 12, 2025, the National Assembly of Vietnam issued Resolution No. 202/2025/QH15 on the arrangement of provincial-level administrative units (effective from June 12, 2025). Accordingly, the entire land area and population of Bắc Kạn Province and Thái Nguyên Province were merged to form a new province named Thái Nguyên Province.

On June 16, 2025, the Standing Committee of the National Assembly of Vietnam issued Resolution No. 1683/NQ-UBTVQH15 on the arrangement of commune-level administrative units of Thái Nguyên Province in 2025 (effective from June 16, 2025). Accordingly, the entire land area and population of Nam Tiến, Đồng Tiến, Tân Hương and Tiên Phong Wards were merged to form a new ward named Vạn Xuân Ward.
