= Đức Xuân (disambiguation) =

Đức Xuân may refer to several places in Vietnam, including:

- Đức Xuân, Thái Nguyên, a ward of Thái Nguyên province
- Đức Xuân, Hà Giang, a former commune of Bắc Quang District
- Đức Xuân, Hòa An, a former commune of Hòa An District in Cao Bằng Province
- Đức Xuân, Thạch An, a former commune of Thạch An District in Cao Bằng Province
