= Trung Thành, Thái Nguyên =

Trung Thành Phường Trung Thành
- Ward
- Welcome gate of Thái Nguyên Province
- Interactive map of Trung Thành
- Country: Vietnam
- Regions: Northeast
- Province: Thái Nguyên Province
- Established: June 16, 2025

Area
  - Total: 25.84 km^{2} (9.98 sq mi)

Population (2025)
  - Total: 37,075
  - Density: 1,435/km^{2} (3,716/sq mi)
- Time zone: UTC+07:00 (Indochina Time)

Trung Thành is a ward (phường) of Thái Nguyên Province, Vietnam.

== Geography ==
Trung Thành Ward located in southern Thái Nguyên Province, and adjacent to:

- Vạn Xuân Ward and Thành Công Commune to the north
- Hanoi City to the south and west
- Bắc Ninh City to the east.

== History ==
On June 12, 2025, the National Assembly of Vietnam issued Resolution No. 202/2025/QH15 on the arrangement of provincial-level administrative units (effective from June 12, 2025). Accordingly, the entire land area and population of Bắc Kạn Province and Thái Nguyên Province were merged to form a new province named Thái Nguyên Province.

On June 16, 2025, the Standing Committee of the National Assembly of Vietnam issued Resolution No. 1683/NQ-UBTVQH15 on the arrangement of commune-level administrative units of Thái Nguyên Province in 2025 (effective from June 16, 2025). Accordingly, the entire land area and population of Trung Thành, Đông Cao, Tân Phú and Thuận Thành Wards (Phổ Yên City) were merged to form a new ward named Trung Thành Ward.
