= Sầm Sơn Beach =

Resort beach in Vietnam

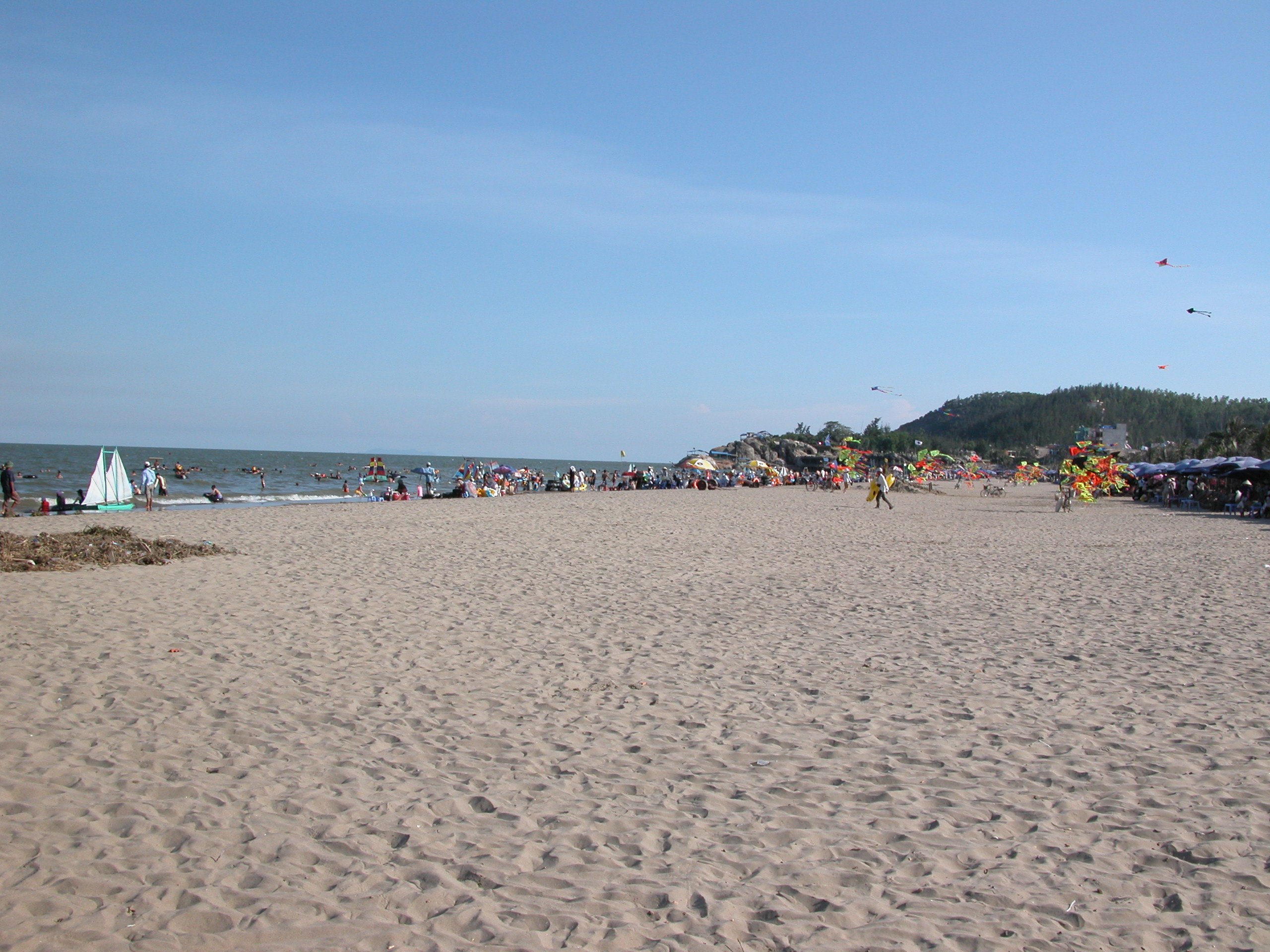
Sầm Sơn beach

Sam Son beach (Vietnamese: Bãi biển Sầm Sơn) is a resort beach in Vietnam. It’s located in Sầm Sơn city, Thanh Hóa Province, Bac Trung Bo region, Vietnam, 16 km east of Thanh Hoa City. The Sầm Sơn beach became a resort beach in 1906 when French colonists began to build facilities here. The beach is 6 km long, extending from estuary of Lạch Hới to the foot of Trường Lệ mount.
