= Bắc Kạn (city) =

- Provincial city (Class-3)
- Bắc Kạn City; Thành phố Bắc Kạn
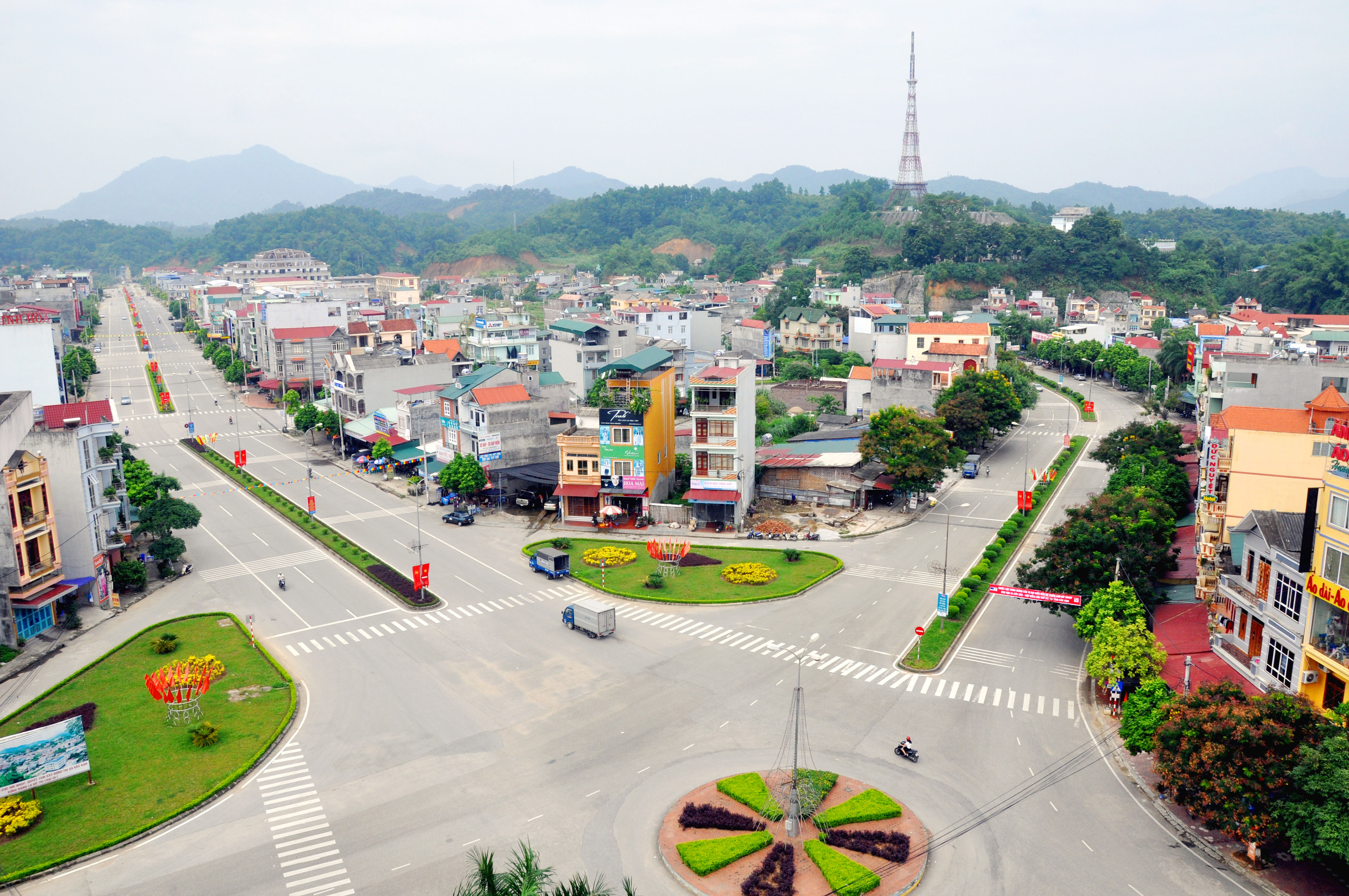

- Seal
- Interactive map of Bắc Kạn
- Location of in Vietnam
- Coordinates: 22°08′N 105°50′E
- Country: Vietnam
- Province: Bắc Kạn
- Established city: 11 March 2015

Area
  - Total: 137 km^{2} (53 sq mi)

Population (2019)
  - Total: 45,036
  - Density: 329/km^{2} (851/sq mi)
- Time zone: UTC+7 (Indochina Time)
- Climate: Cwa

Bắc Kạn is the former capital of Bắc Kạn Province, Vietnam. The province's only city, it is bordered by Bạch Thông District to the north, north-east and west and Chợ Mới District to the south-east and south-west. Bắc Kạn is 160 kilometers away from Ha Noi.

As of 2019 it had a population of 45,036 people. The town traces its origins to a fort established in 1880 and upgraded to city on 11 March 2015. It is divided into six wards: Nguyễn Thị Minh Khai, Đức Xuân, Sông Cầu, Phùng Chí Kiên, Huyền Tụng and Xuất Hóa and 2 communes: Dương Quang, Nông Thượng.

== History ==
Bắc Kạn (chữ nôm: 北𣴓) was established as a fort in 1880 for troops of the Nguyễn government during the 1878 revolt of Li Yung Choï (Vietnamese: Lý Dương Tài) coincident with the Black Flag Army. Following Li's capture and decapitation, the remains of his group reformed under Liu Zhiping (Vietnamese: Lục Chi Bình) and with 5,000 men attacked the fort defended by 300 Annamite soldiers in 1881.

The town of Bắc Kạn was one of the early headquarters of the Việt Minh in the war against the French. Jean-Étienne Valluy aimed to surround the area and capture the town in Operation Léa between 7 October and 22 December 1947. A parachute drop caught the Việt Minh by surprise and seized letters left on the desk of Ho Chi Minh. Both Ho and Võ Nguyên Giáp escaped only by hiding in camouflaged holes nearby. It was also an area of fighting between the communists and Việt Nam Quốc Dân Đảng armed forces.

== Climate ==
Climate data for Bắc Kạn
Month	Jan	Feb	Mar	Apr	May	Jun	Jul	Aug	Sep	Oct	Nov	Dec	Year
Record high °C (°F)	31.5 (88.7)	35.8 (96.4)	36.4 (97.5)	38.7 (101.7)	40.5 (104.9)	39.4 (102.9)	38.6 (101.5)	37.5 (99.5)	38.0 (100.4)	35.2 (95.4)	33.9 (93.0)	31.9 (89.4)	40.5 (104.9)
Mean daily maximum °C (°F)	19.2 (66.6)	20.4 (68.7)	23.3 (73.9)	27.5 (81.5)	31.3 (88.3)	32.5 (90.5)	32.5 (90.5)	32.5 (90.5)	31.6 (88.9)	28.9 (84.0)	25.3 (77.5)	21.6 (70.9)	27.2 (81.0)
Daily mean °C (°F)	14.8 (58.6)	16.5 (61.7)	19.5 (67.1)	23.3 (73.9)	26.3 (79.3)	27.6 (81.7)	27.6 (81.7)	27.2 (81.0)	26.1 (79.0)	23.4 (74.1)	19.6 (67.3)	16.1 (61.0)	22.4 (72.3)
Mean daily minimum °C (°F)	12.2 (54.0)	14.1 (57.4)	17.1 (62.8)	20.5 (68.9)	22.9 (73.2)	24.4 (75.9)	24.6 (76.3)	24.2 (75.6)	22.8 (73.0)	20.1 (68.2)	16.2 (61.2)	12.8 (55.0)	19.3 (66.7)
Record low °C (°F)	−0.9 (30.4)	2.4 (36.3)	4.9 (40.8)	10.2 (50.4)	14.4 (57.9)	16.5 (61.7)	18.7 (65.7)	19.8 (67.6)	13.7 (56.7)	8.5 (47.3)	4.0 (39.2)	−1.0 (30.2)	−1.0 (30.2)
Average rainfall mm (inches)	23.8 (0.94)	26.6 (1.05)	51.4 (2.02)	103.8 (4.09)	183.9 (7.24)	255.6 (10.06)	288.4 (11.35)	274.1 (10.79)	148.2 (5.83)	74.4 (2.93)	40.0 (1.57)	19.9 (0.78)	1,490.4 (58.68)
Average rainy days	8.7	9.4	13.1	13.6	15.0	17.0	19.3	18.8	12.9	9.1	7.3	6.0	150.2
Average relative humidity (%)	81.3	81.4	82.8	83.0	81.8	84.0	85.7	86.2	84.5	82.8	82.1	80.4	83.0
Mean monthly sunshine hours	66.8	56.6	59.8	96.2	165.4	155.3	172.5	174.2	178.2	151.1	126.6	109.7	1,511.2
Source: Vietnam Institute for Building Science and Technology
