= Thanh Hoa (disambiguation) =

Thanh Hoa may refer to several places in Vietnam, including:

- Thanh Hóa Province
- Thanh Hóa (city), the provincial capital of Thanh Hóa Province
- Thanh Hóa, Quảng Bình, a rural commune of Tuyên Hóa District
- Thạnh Hóa District, a rural district of Long An Province
- Thạnh Hóa, a township and capital of Thạnh Hóa District

== See also ==
- Thanh Hóa Bridge across the Sông Mã river near Thanh Hóa
