= Minh Đức =

- Commune
- ĐT752 road through the commune
- Interactive map of Minh Đức
- Coordinates: 11.596218°N 106.577895°E
- Country: Vietnam
- City: Đồng Nai
- Region: Southeast

Area
  - Total: 167.1 km^{2} (64.5 sq mi)

Population (31 December 2025)
  - Total: 17,343
  - Density: 103/km^{2} (270/sq mi)
- Website: minhduc.dongnai.gov.vn

Minh Đức is a commune in Đồng Nai, Vietnam.

On 12 June 2025, the National Assembly of Vietnam adopted Resolution No. 202/2025/QH15 on the reorganization of provincial-level administrative units, which took effect on the same day. Under the resolution, Bình Phước province was merged into Đồng Nai.

On 16 June 2025, the Standing Committee of the National Assembly of Vietnam adopted Resolution No. 1662/NQ-UBTVQH15 on the reorganization of commune-level administrative units in Đồng Nai. Under the resolution, the entire area and population of An Phú, Minh Đức and Minh Tâm communes, formerly in Hớn Quản district, Bình Phước province, were consolidated to form a new commune named Minh Đức.
