= Phổ Yên =

- Phổ Yên Ward Martyrs' Memorial

- Emblem
- Interactive map of Phổ Yên
- Coordinates: 21.415543°N 105.874095°E
- Country: Vietnam
- Province: Thái Nguyên
- Region: Northeast
- Established: 2025

Area
  - Total: 40.7 km^{2} (15.7 sq mi)

Population (2025)
  - Total: 49,162
  - Density: 1,207/km^{2} (3,130/sq mi)
- Website: phoyen.thainguyen.gov.vn

Phổ Yên is a ward in the southern part of Thái Nguyên, Vietnam. The ward inherited its name from the former Phổ Yên City.

== History ==
In 1972, Ba Hàng Township was established by separating Ba Hàng Town from Đồng Tiến Commune, while Bãi Bông Township was established from part of the area and population of Hồng Tiến Commune.

In 2015, Phổ Yên District became Phổ Yên Town, and Ba Hàng Ward was established from the entire 1.8315 km² of natural area and a population of 7,661 of Ba Hàng Township, together with 2.6138 km² of natural area and a population of 2,478 from Đồng Tiến Commune. Bãi Bông Ward was established from the entire 3.5065 km² of natural area and a population of 5,614 of Bãi Bông Township.

In 2022, Phổ Yên Town became Phổ Yên City, Thái Nguyên Province. Hồng Tiến Ward was established from the entire 18.47 km² of natural area and a population of 15,076 of Hồng Tiến Commune, while Đắc Sơn Ward was established from the entire 14.36 km² of natural area and a population of 11,198 of Đắc Sơn Commune.

In June 2025, Phổ Yên Ward was established by merging the entire natural area and population of Ba Hàng, Hồng Tiến, Bãi Bông, and Đắc Sơn wards of Phổ Yên City.
