= Bến Cát (city) =

Former provincial city in Bình Dương, Vietnam

- Provincial city (Class-3)
- Bến Cát City; Thành phố Bến Cát
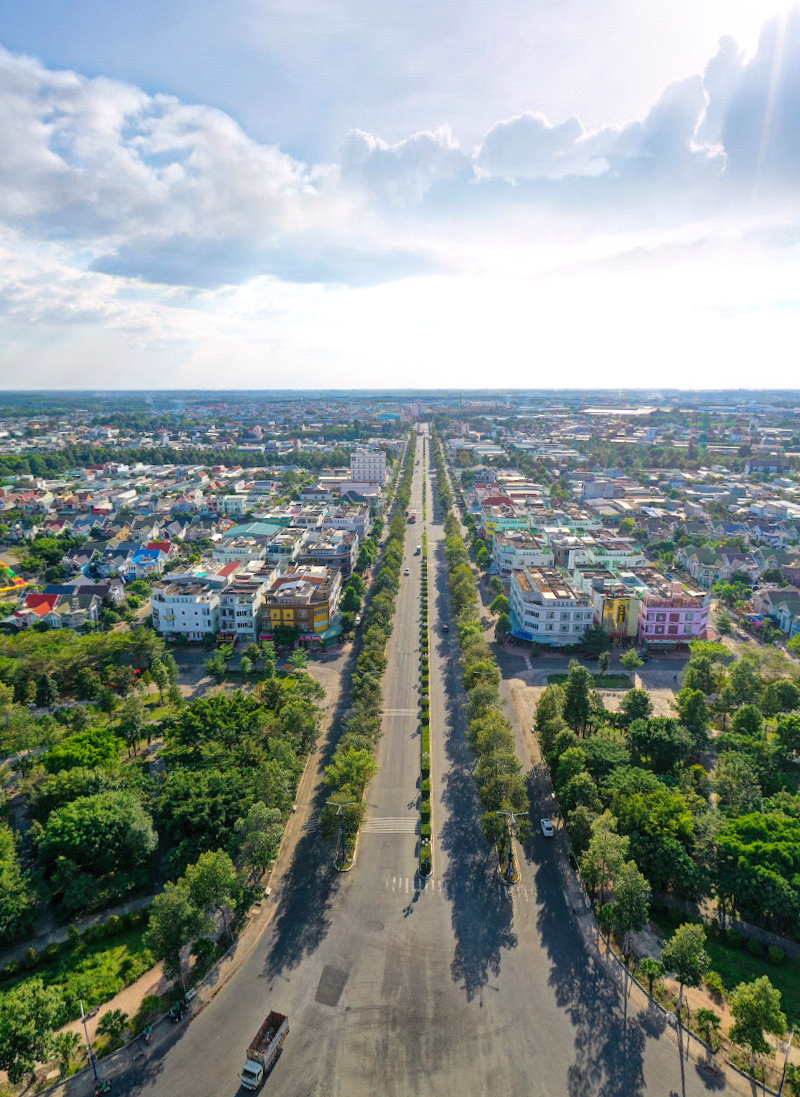
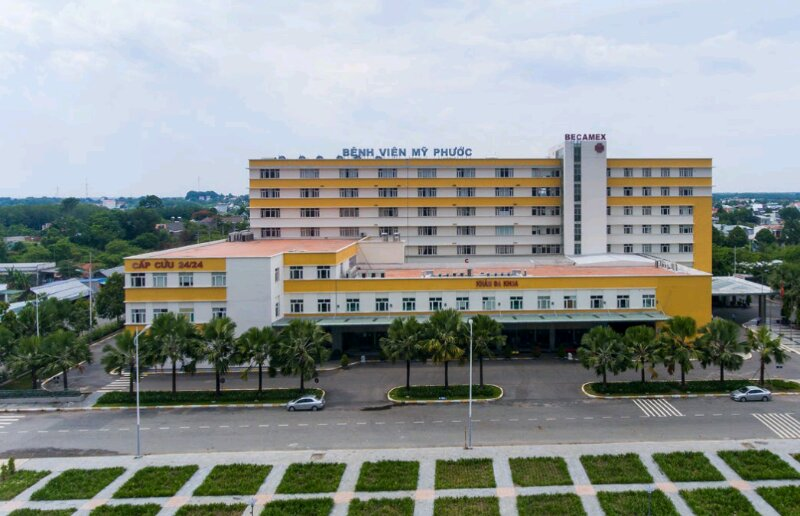
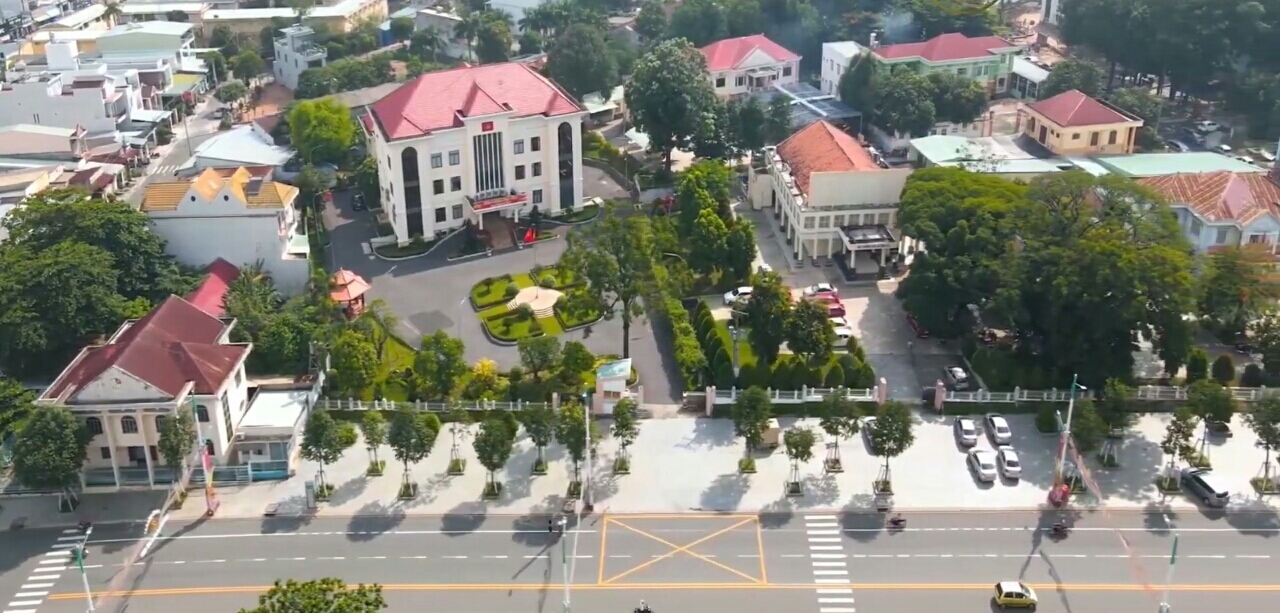
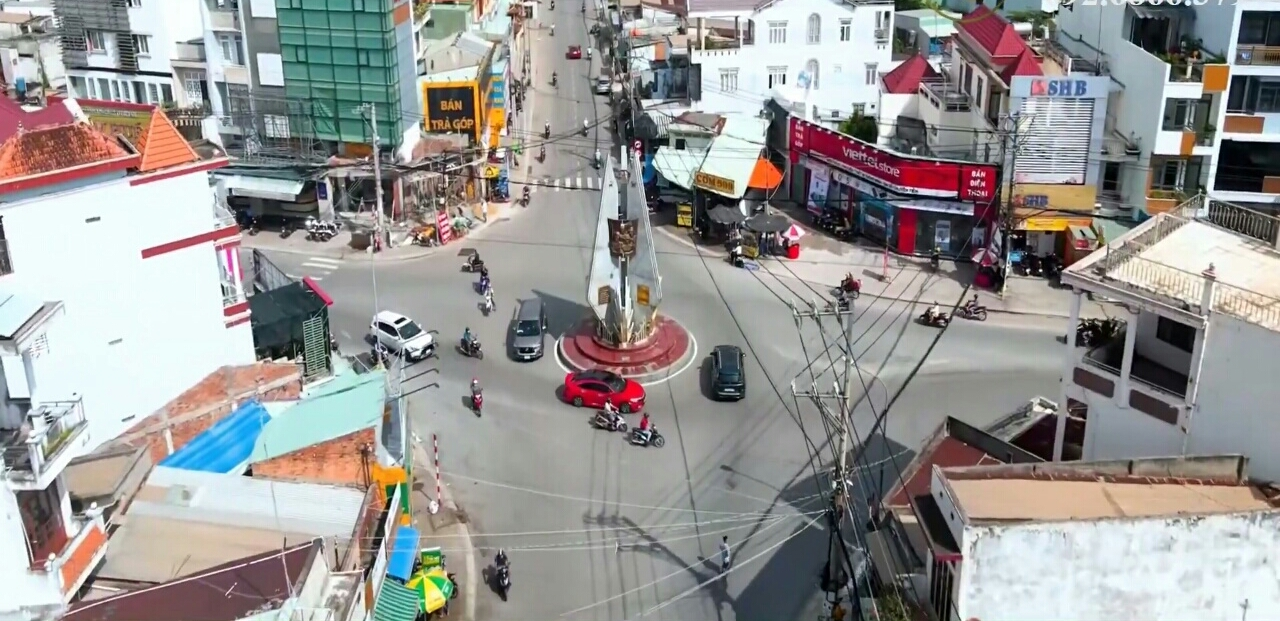
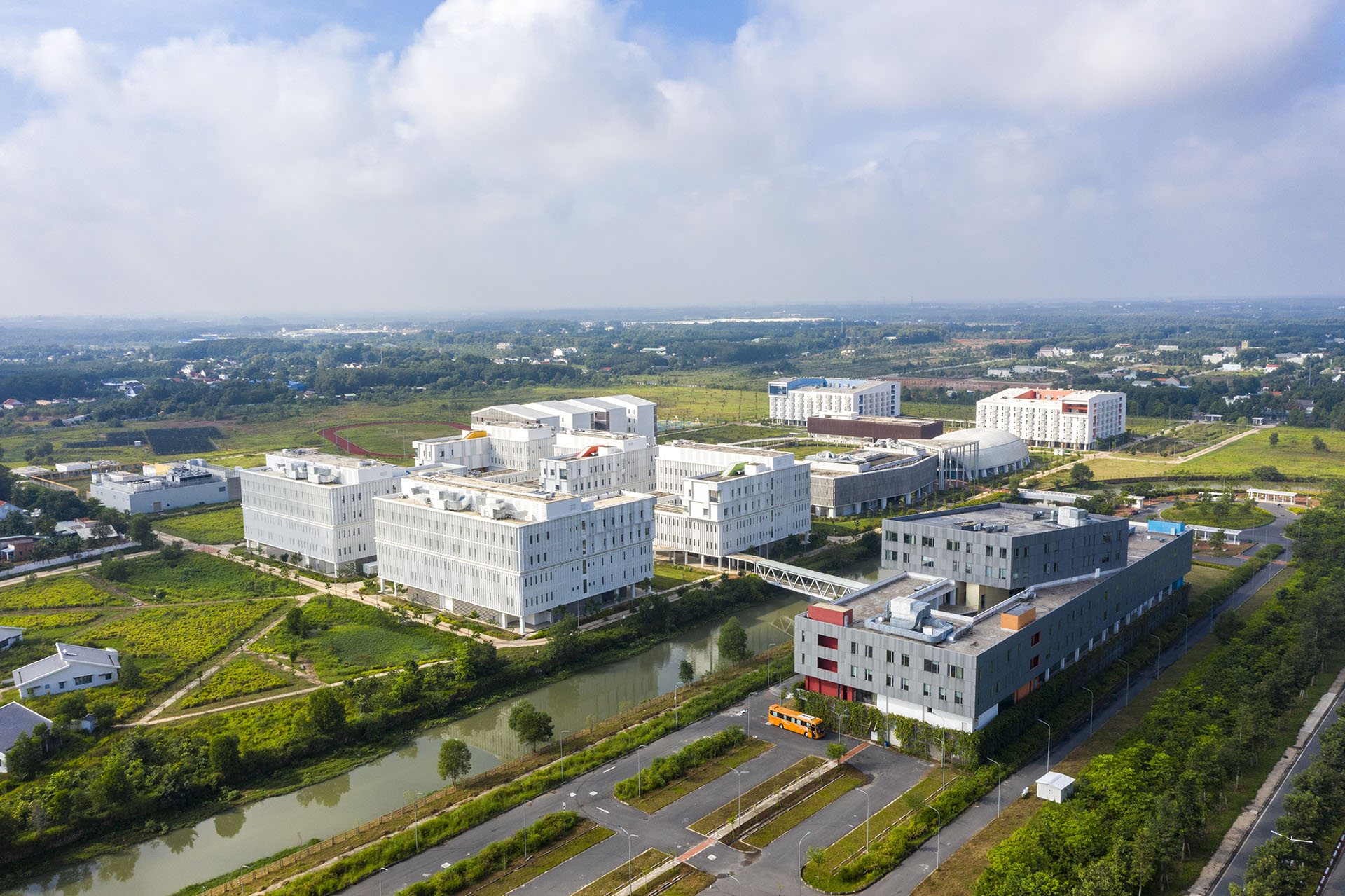
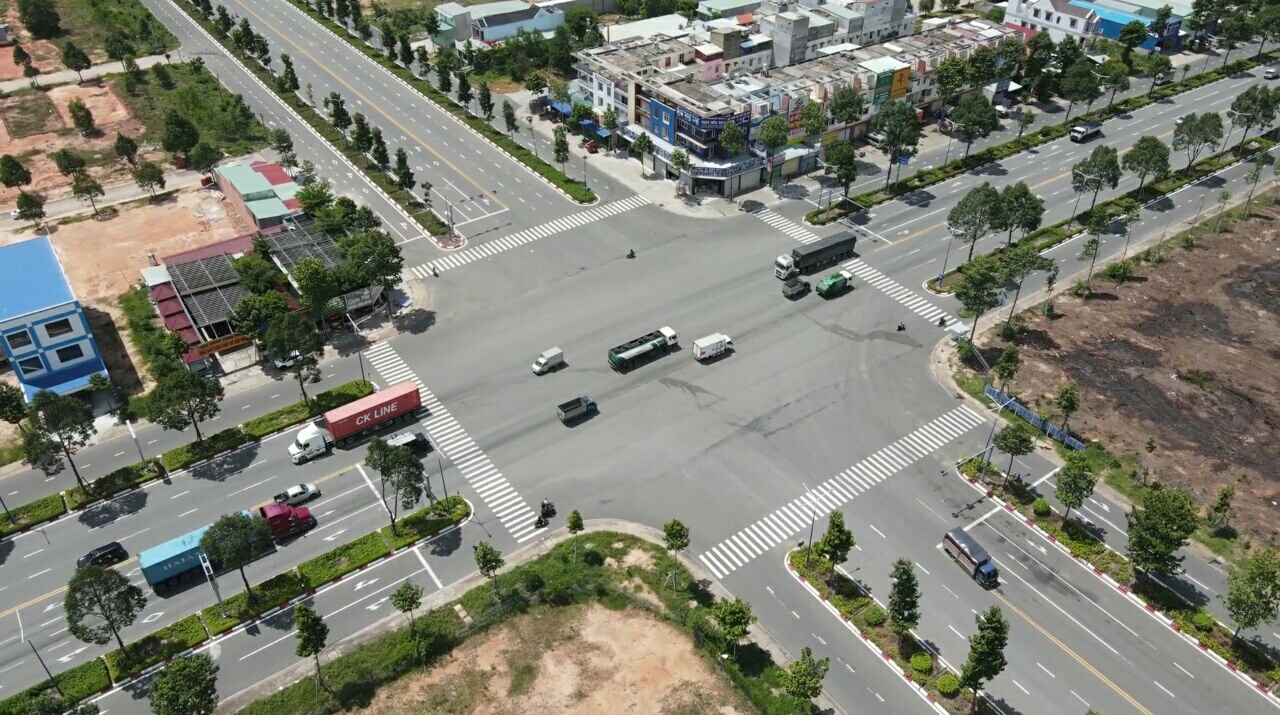
- From left to right, from top to bottom: A corner of Ben Cat town, My Phuoc General Hospital, the town's administrative center, central roundabout, Vietnamese German University, My Phuoc Tan Van intersection - Ring 4 Ho Chi Minh City
- Interactive map of Bến Cát
- Location within Vietnam Location within Southeast Asia Location within Asia
- Coordinates: 11°7′58″N 106°36′30″E
- Country: Vietnam
- Region: Southeast
- Province: Bình Dương
- Capital: Mỹ Phước

Government
  - Type: City
  - Chairman of the People's Committees: Nguyễn Trọng Ân
  - Chairman of the People's Council: Huỳnh Văn Nghe

Area
  - Total: 90.48 sq mi (234.35 km^{2})
- Elevation: 130 ft (40 m)

Population (2022)
  - Total: 364,578
  - Density: 4,029.2/sq mi (1,555.7/km^{2})
- Time zone: UTC+7 (Indochina Time)
- Postal code: 75900
- Area code: 0274
- Website: https://bencat.binhduong.gov.vn/

Bến Cát is a former provincial city in the former Bình Dương province, 50 km north of Ho Chi Minh City, Vietnam.

Ben Cat is a grade 3 urban area under Binh Duong province in Vietnam, with a total natural area of 234.35 km^{2}, a population of 364.578 people and a population density of 1,555 people/km^{2} divided into 7 wards (An Điền, An Tây, Chánh Phú Hòa, Hòa Lợi, Tân Định, Thới Hòa, Mỹ Phước) and Phú An commune. Mỹ Phước ward is considered the cultural, economic and political center of Bến Cát city.

Bến Cát city borders Bàu Bàng district to the north, Dầu Tiếng district to the west, Tân Uyên city and Phú Giáo district to the east, Thủ Dầu Một city and Củ Chi district of Ho Chi Minh city to the south.

Ben Cat is in the transition zone from the Trường Sơn range in the north of the central highland to the southern plain, so the general topography of the whole town is relatively high from 30 to 35m above sea level in the north and lower to the south. In the south, the climate belongs to the tropical savanna region, there is little flooding and the average annual rainfall is about 1,500-2,500mm, the average monthly temperature is 32°C during the day and 23°C at night, the hottest month is 36 °C and the coldest month is 16°C. In mid-December, the town often has dense fog in the early morning and ends at 7-8am.

Ben Cat is considered the southern key economic zone (SKEZ), the industrial capital of Binh Duong province. In the whole area of Ben Cat city, there are many industrial parks built as models with complete infrastructure, built in the direction of focusing on environmental protection, creating a green and clean industrial park according to the model. Forming a modern industrial and urban city towards long-term and sustainable development in the north of Binh Duong province.

Currently, Ben Cat has many industrial parks, which have been deployed to phase 5 and have attracted 380 investment projects from 24 countries and territories with a total estimated capital of nearly US$7.8 billion. Countries and territories with high investment rates in industrial parks are the United States, Taiwan, China, South Korea, Japan, etc. Focusing on the following fields: electrical, electronic, mechanical industry manufacturing, food processing, wood industry and interior decoration, garment, supporting industries. The favorable geographical position has made industrial parks in Ben Cat an ideal place for investors to produce goods for domestic consumption as well as for export.

The income per capita is around 6,500 USD/year.
