= Tuy Hòa (city) =

- Provincial city (Class-2)
- Tuy Hòa City; Thành phố Tuy Hòa
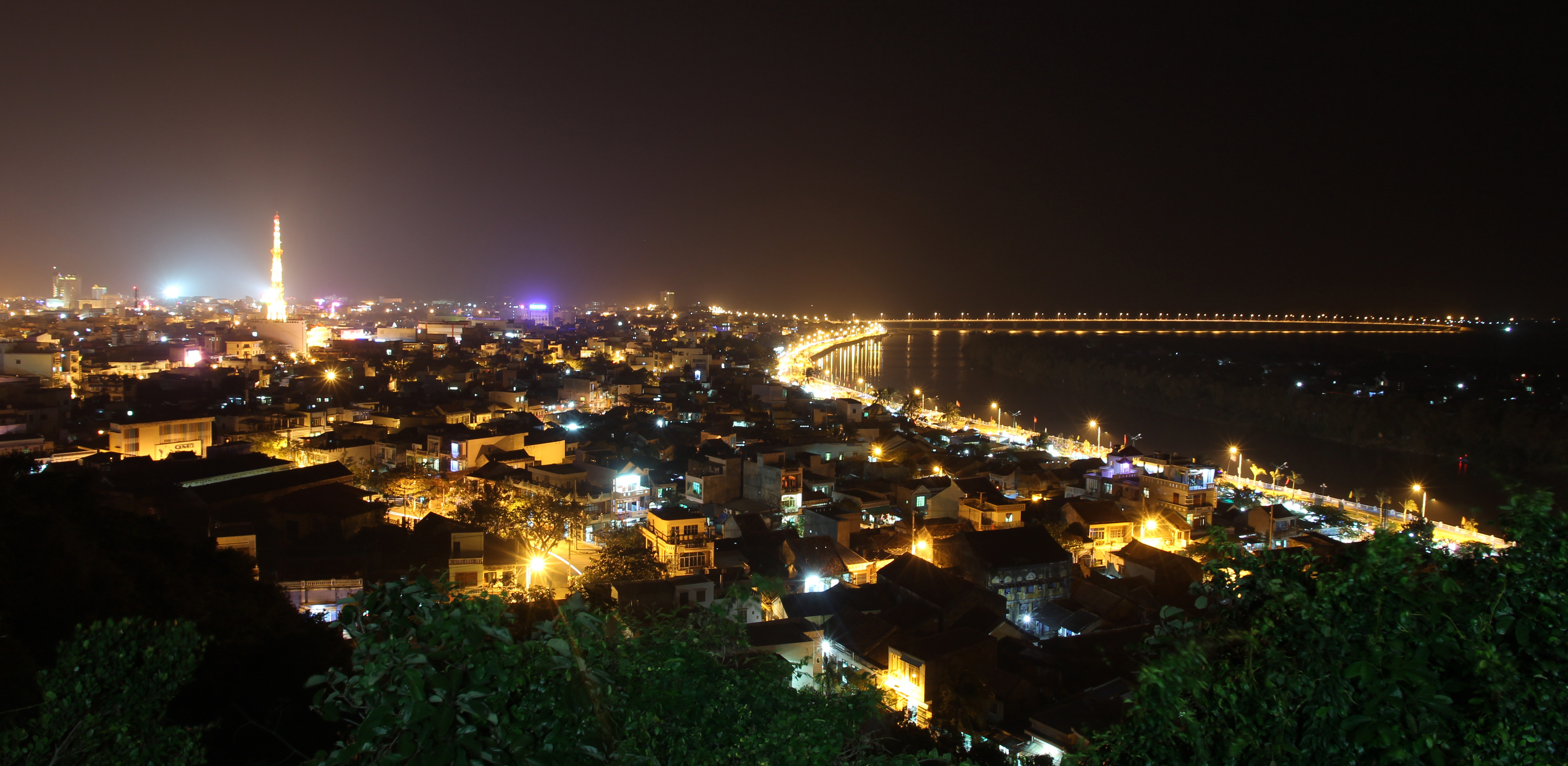
- The city at night

- Seal

- Location of Tuy Hòa in Vietnam
- Coordinates: 13°04′55″N 109°17′42″E
- Country: Vietnam
- Province: Phú Yên

Area
  - Total: 106.82 km^{2} (41.24 sq mi)

Population (2019)
  - Total: 155,921
  - Density: 1,459.7/km^{2} (3,780.5/sq mi)
- Time zone: UTC+7 (Indochina Time)

Tuy Hòa is a former coastal city and the former capital of the defunct Phú Yên province in the South Central Coast region of Vietnam. The city has a total area of 106.82 square kilometres or 41 square miles and a population of 155,921 (in 2019). The city is located approximately midway between Nha Trang and Quy Nhơn. The city is formulated mainly from alluvial of the downstream of Đà Rằng River. There are two mountains in the center of the city: Chóp Chài Mountain and Nhạn Mountain. There is a Champa Temple on the top of Nhạn Mountain.

== Climate ==
Tuy Hòa has a tropical savanna climate (Köppen: As), very close to a tropical monsoon climate (Am)

Climate data for Tuy Hòa
Month	Jan	Feb	Mar	Apr	May	Jun	Jul	Aug	Sep	Oct	Nov	Dec	Year
Record high °C (°F)	33.7 (92.7)	36.5 (97.7)	36.4 (97.5)	39.8 (103.6)	40.5 (104.9)	40.0 (104.0)	39.0 (102.2)	40.1 (104.2)	38.4 (101.1)	36.1 (97.0)	34.5 (94.1)	33.1 (91.6)	40.5 (104.9)
Mean daily maximum °C (°F)	26.4 (79.5)	27.6 (81.7)	29.5 (85.1)	31.8 (89.2)	33.9 (93.0)	34.5 (94.1)	34.2 (93.6)	34.0 (93.2)	32.7 (90.9)	29.8 (85.6)	28.0 (82.4)	26.6 (79.9)	30.8 (87.4)
Daily mean °C (°F)	23.3 (73.9)	23.9 (75.0)	25.4 (77.7)	27.4 (81.3)	28.9 (84.0)	29.4 (84.9)	29.1 (84.4)	28.9 (84.0)	27.9 (82.2)	26.5 (79.7)	25.4 (77.7)	24.0 (75.2)	26.7 (80.1)
Mean daily minimum °C (°F)	21.0 (69.8)	21.3 (70.3)	22.4 (72.3)	24.0 (75.2)	25.4 (77.7)	26.1 (79.0)	25.8 (78.4)	25.6 (78.1)	24.8 (76.6)	24.1 (75.4)	23.4 (74.1)	22.0 (71.6)	23.9 (75.0)
Record low °C (°F)	15.2 (59.4)	16.0 (60.8)	16.4 (61.5)	18.8 (65.8)	21.4 (70.5)	21.9 (71.4)	21.7 (71.1)	22.0 (71.6)	20.9 (69.6)	19.1 (66.4)	17.7 (63.9)	15.2 (59.4)	15.2 (59.4)
Average rainfall mm (inches)	66.9 (2.63)	22.5 (0.89)	36.0 (1.42)	46.1 (1.81)	90.8 (3.57)	54.3 (2.14)	45.5 (1.79)	55.2 (2.17)	227.4 (8.95)	539.5 (21.24)	507.9 (20.00)	216.5 (8.52)	1,911.3 (75.25)
Average rainy days	12.5	6.2	5.0	5.0	9.0	7.0	7.1	9.4	15.3	20.8	21.5	19.0	137.5
Average relative humidity (%)	83.4	83.3	82.9	81.7	78.3	73.9	73.9	74.7	79.9	85.1	85.5	84.2	80.6
Mean monthly sunshine hours	160.5	196.0	251.6	269.7	272.8	239.9	239.3	230.6	203.6	168.0	128.3	118.2	2,472.9
Source: Vietnam Institute for Building Science and Technology

== Infrastructure ==
=== Transportation ===
==== By air ====
The city is served by Đông Tác Airport which lies south of Tuy Hòa.

==== By land ====
Tuy Hòa Railway Station is a stop on the North-South Railway. National Route 1 runs through the city, providing road connections to Hanoi in the north and Ho Chi Minh City in the south.

== Gallery ==
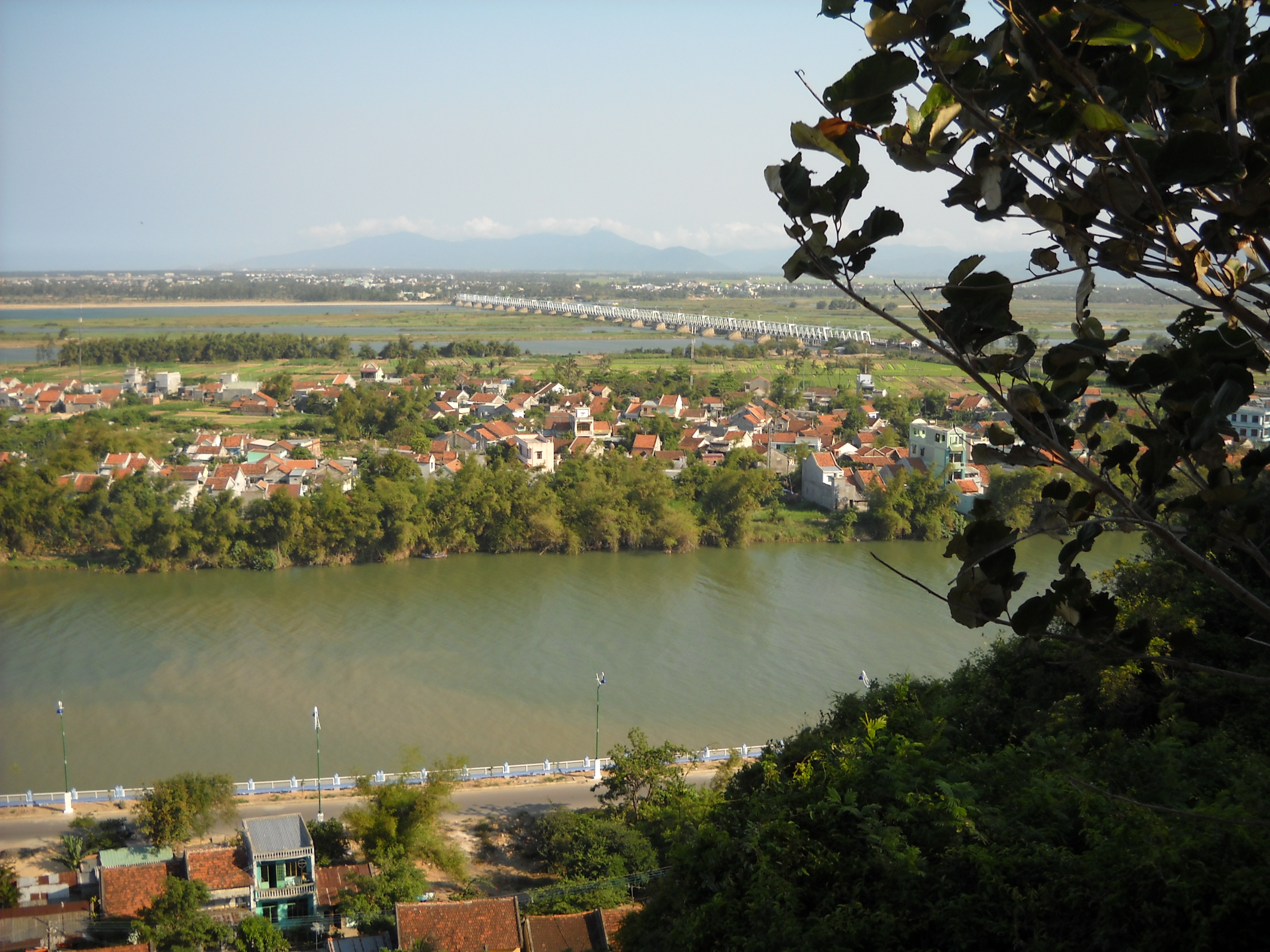
Đà Rằng Bridge, Tuy Hòa, Phú Yên

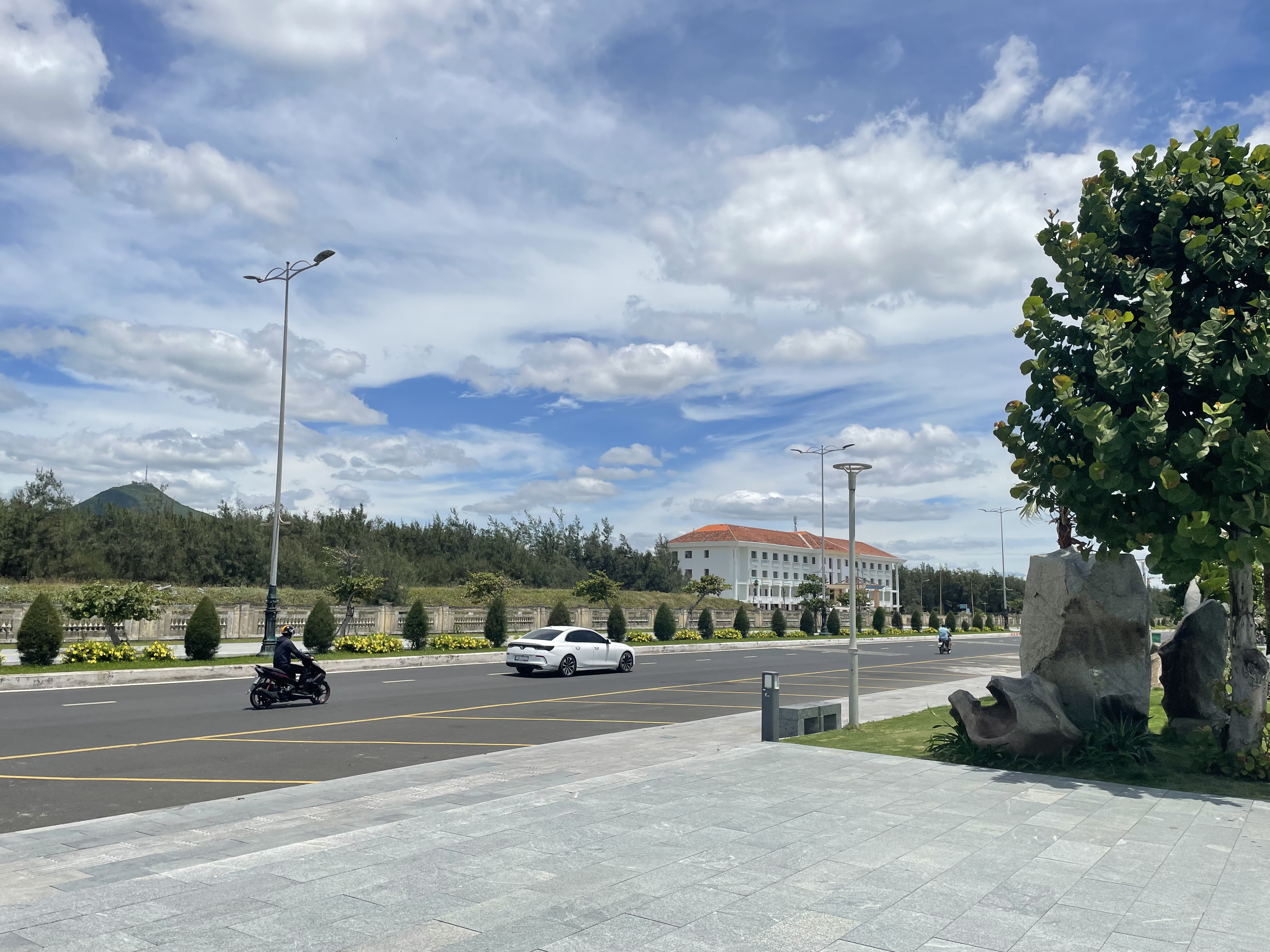
Street in Tuy Hòa viewed from Nghinh Phong tower

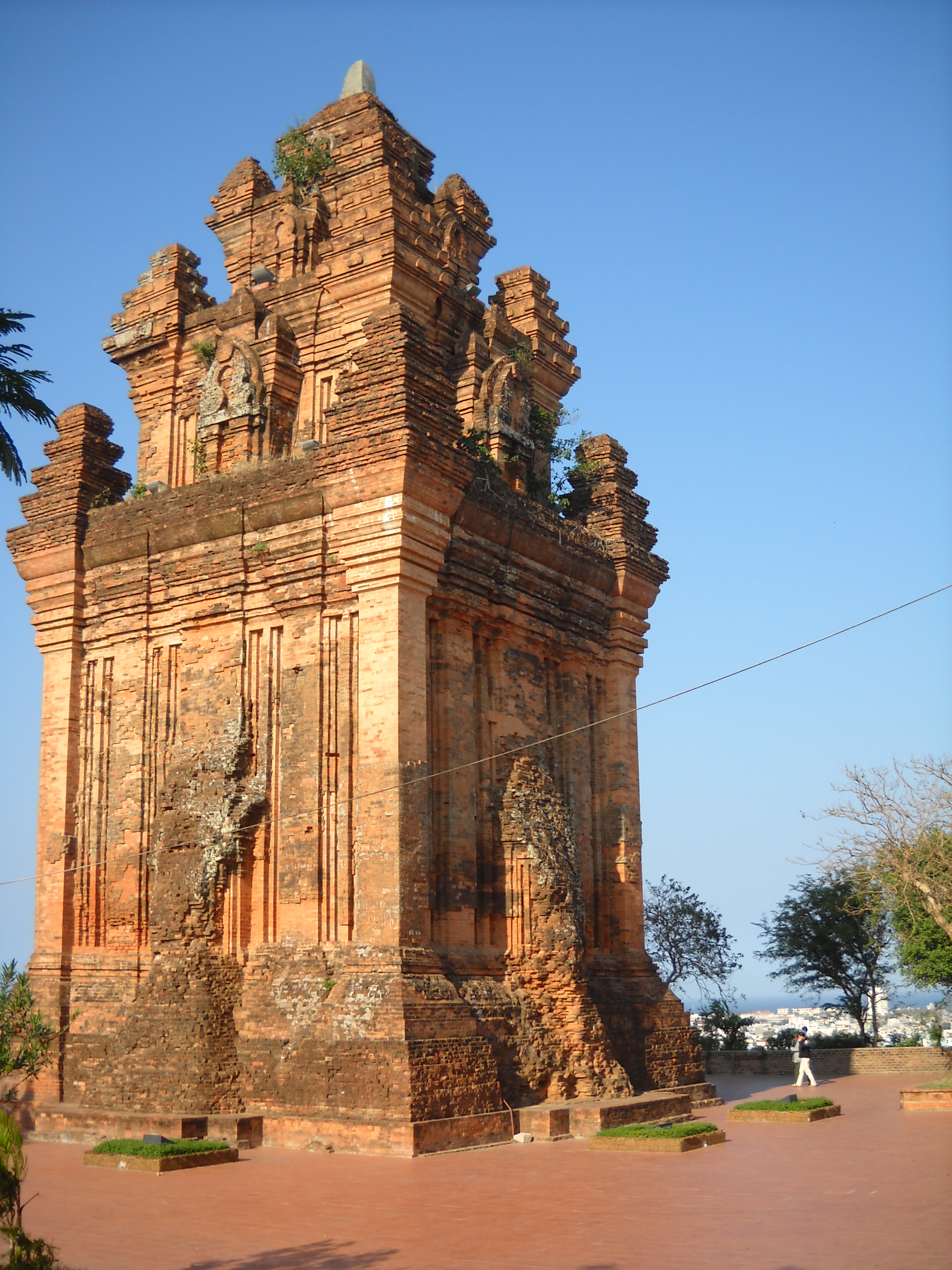
Nhạn Tower

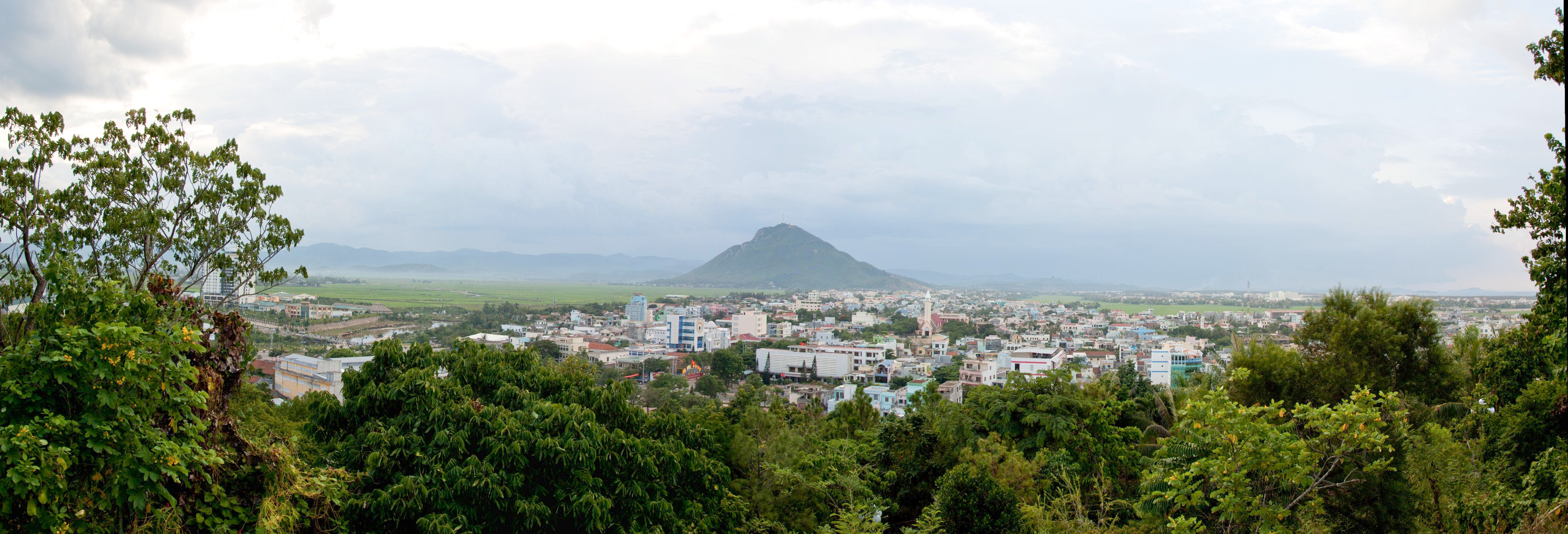
Tuy Hòa city view from Champa Temple on Nhan mountain
