= Sầm Sơn (city) =

Sầm Sơn City Thành phố Sầm Sơn
- Provincial city (Class-3)
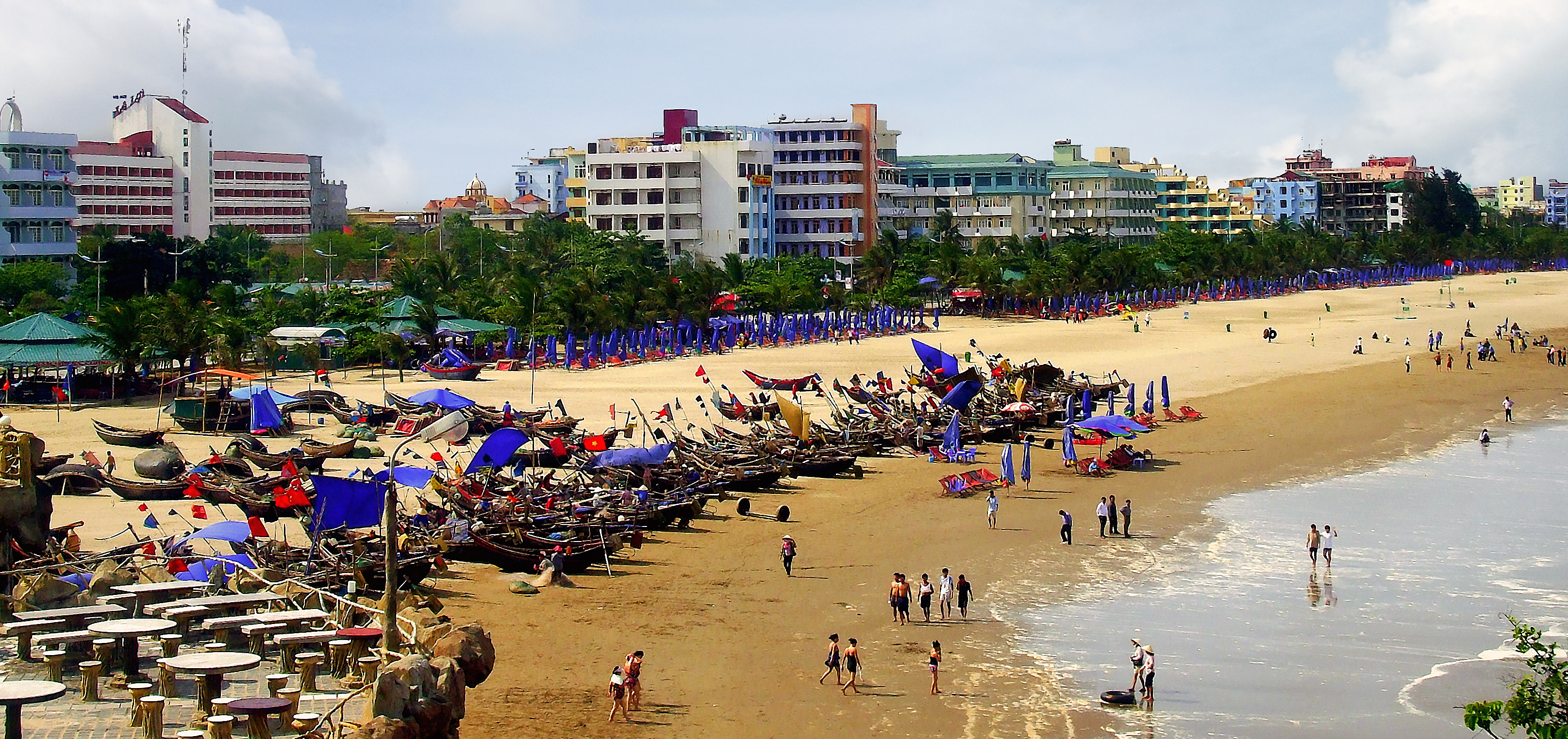
- A part of Sầm Sơn beach in 2010.
- /0/queryThe property query is required; /0/idsThe property ids is required; /0Failed to match at least one schema; /0/titleThe property title is required; /0/serviceDoes not have a value in the enumeration ["page"]; /0Failed to match exactly one schema; /0/geometriesThe property geometries is required; /0/typeDoes not have a value in the enumeration ["GeometryCollection"]; /0/typeDoes not have a value in the enumeration ["MultiPolygon"]; /0/typeDoes not have a value in the enumeration ["Point"]; /0/typeDoes not have a value in the enumeration ["MultiPoint"]; /0/typeDoes not have a value in the enumeration ["LineString"]; /0/typeDoes not have a value in the enumeration ["MultiLineString"]; /0/typeDoes not have a value in the enumeration ["Polygon"]; /0/coordinatesThe property coordinates is required; /0/geometryThe property geometry is required; /0/typeDoes not have a value in the enumeration ["Feature"]; /0/featuresThe property features is required; /0/typeDoes not have a value in the enumeration ["FeatureCollection"]
- Location of Sầm Sơn in Vietnam.
- Coordinates: 19°44′N 105°54′E
- Country: Vietnam
- Province: Thanh Hóa Province
- Establishment: 18 December 1981
- Central hall: No.505, Lê Lợi street, Quảng Châu ward, Sầm Sơn city

Government
  - Type: Municipality
  - People Committee's Chairman: Lê Văn Tú
  - People Council's chairman: Lê Trung Thành
  - Front Committee's chairman: Nguyễn Minh Tâm
  - Party Committee's Secretary: Lương Tất Thắng

Area
  - Provincial city (Class-3): 44.94 km^{2} (17.35 sq mi)

Population (2022)
  - Provincial city (Class-3): 129,801
  - Density: 2,888/km^{2} (7,480/sq mi)
  - Urban: 109,897
  - Metro: 19,904
  - Ethnicities: Kinh; Mường; Tanka
- Time zone: UTC+7 (Indochina Time)
- ZIP code: 40208
- Climate: Cwa
- Website: Samson.Thanhhoa.gov.vn; Samson.Thanhhoa.dcs.vn

Sầm Sơn [sə̤m˨˩:səːn˧˧] is a former resort city of Thanh Hóa province in the North Central Coast of Vietnam.

== History ==
=== Middle Ages ===
Before the 20th century, Sầm Sơn never appeared in any geographical map. It was originally the name of a small mountain in the Southern waters of Quảng Xương district. The seafarers called it as the growling mountain (núi Gầm), which referred to the sound of the waves hitting the cliff. Later, local officials wrote the name in Chinese characters as 岑山 (Note: The shape of script sầm (岑) is like a mountain with waves below it.) (pronounced Sầm Sơn in Vietnamese).

The official name of this mountain is Trường Lệ (長麗山, "the beautiful mountain"). This name was only used at the Nguyễn court, rarely by the common people. It has become the name of a fishing village in the area, which was not called so by the locals.

=== 20th century ===
Starting from the location of Trường Lệ village, French explorers conducted a number of surveys for two years 1905 and 1906 to prepare for a project of the Government of French Indochina.

From 1907 to close to the First World War, Sầm Sơn resort area (khu nghỉ mát Sầm Sơn) was gradually planned to become the only modern resort in the current zone of the North Central of Vietnam. Sầm Sơn became a famous place in what was then French Indochina. At that time, many holiday villas were constructed here. However, local services were basically expensive, so they were almost only serving national leaders, officials and entrepreneurs.

After the August Revolution, the Samson resort official called as Lương Niệm commune (xã Lương Niệm). By June 1946, Lương Niệm was split into two new communes : Sầm Sơn and Bắc Sơn. However, in November 1947, Bắc Sơn and Sầm Sơn were re-merged as Quảng Tiến commune (xã Quảng Tiến), belonged Quảng Xương rural district.

The rare notable event of this resort is, in 1946, when President Hồ Chí Minh invited the Former Emperor Bảo Đại to Hanoi as the Senior Advisor, the King resided in Sầm Sơn a few months before coming to Hong Kong. The press of the opposing forces with Việt Minh then satirized that "Vietnam's royal capital moved to Sầm Sơn".

Immediately after the Geneva Agreement (1954), Lạch Hới port of Quảng Tiến commune (now Quảng Tiến ward, Sầm Sơn city) was chosen by the Việt Minh government to be one of the two places to welcome the south people to migrate to the North.

In June 1954, Quảng Tiến was continued to split into four new communes as Quảng Cư, Quảng Sơn, Quảng Tiến and Quảng Tường by the Việt Minh government.

On 19 April 1963, based on the area of Sầm Sơn resort and Quảng Sơn commune, the Government of North Vietnam issued Decision 50/CP to establish Sầm Sơn township (thị trấn Sầm Sơn). In the following years, Sầm Sơn was constantly planned and upgraded to become a free resort for the working class under the help of experts from the Soviet Union, Bulgaria and China. According to contemporary regulations, in addition to government officials, only those who achieve high results in learning and labor are allowed to take vacation on this beach. However, due to the harsh climate of Thanh Hóa province, Sầm Sơn was almost only opened to visitors from the middle of spring (February or April) to the end of autumn (October). Besides, until the end of 1980s, all transaction forms of money were banned in this area by the government, which was considered "the remnant of evil capitalism".

=== 21st century ===
In April and May 2007 Sầm Sơn celebrated the 100th anniversary of its establishment by organizing a Sầm Sơn Festival. The Thanh Hóa provincial government invested US$375,000 to upgrade infrastructure along the sea, on water supply, lighting systems and an information network to prepare for the festival. About 22 training courses were organized for 3,000 cyclists, cameramen, vendors and tourist guides.

As of 2019 the district-level town had a population of 109,208. The district covers an area of 18 km^{2} (6.9 sq mi).

From 14 May 2015 the town was extended on the basis of the merger of six communes of Quang Xuong District.

From 19 April 2017 this town was upgraded to city.

== Geography ==
Sầm Sơn city is situated 16 km east of Thanh Hóa province capital, Thanh Hóa, on the shore of the South China Sea.

=== Climate ===
Climate data for Sầm Sơn
Month	Jan	Feb	Mar	Apr	May	Jun	Jul	Aug	Sep	Oct	Nov	Dec	Year
Record high °C (°F)	31.5 (88.7)	—	29.9 (85.8)	36.3 (97.3)	—	40.3 (104.5)	—	—	—	—	—	—	40.3 (104.5)
Mean daily maximum °C (°F)	19.5 (67.1)	21.1 (70.0)	23.6 (74.5)	27.4 (81.3)	30.2 (86.4)	32.1 (89.8)	31.7 (89.1)	30.8 (87.4)	29.6 (85.3)	27.5 (81.5)	24.7 (76.5)	20.8 (69.4)	26.6 (79.9)
Daily mean °C (°F)	17.3 (63.1)	18.8 (65.8)	21.1 (70.0)	24.8 (76.6)	27.7 (81.9)	29.6 (85.3)	29.3 (84.7)	28.4 (83.1)	27.2 (81.0)	25.2 (77.4)	22.2 (72.0)	18.5 (65.3)	24.2 (75.5)
Mean daily minimum °C (°F)	14.9 (58.8)	16.5 (61.7)	19.0 (66.2)	22.7 (72.9)	25.6 (78.1)	27.5 (81.5)	27.3 (81.1)	26.4 (79.5)	25.1 (77.2)	23.0 (73.4)	19.8 (67.6)	16.0 (60.8)	22.0 (71.6)
Record low °C (°F)	5.7 (42.3)	8.5 (47.3)	—	—	—	—	—	—	—	—	—	6.1 (43.0)	5.7 (42.3)
Average precipitation mm (inches)	62 (2.4)	46 (1.8)	61 (2.4)	67 (2.6)	147 (5.8)	153 (6.0)	221 (8.7)	316 (12.4)	375 (14.8)	249 (9.8)	87 (3.4)	61 (2.4)	1,845 (72.5)
Source: Climate-Data.org

== See also ==
- Thanh Hóa
- Cửa Lò
