= Tuy Hòa station =

Railway station in Vietnam

Tuy Hòa
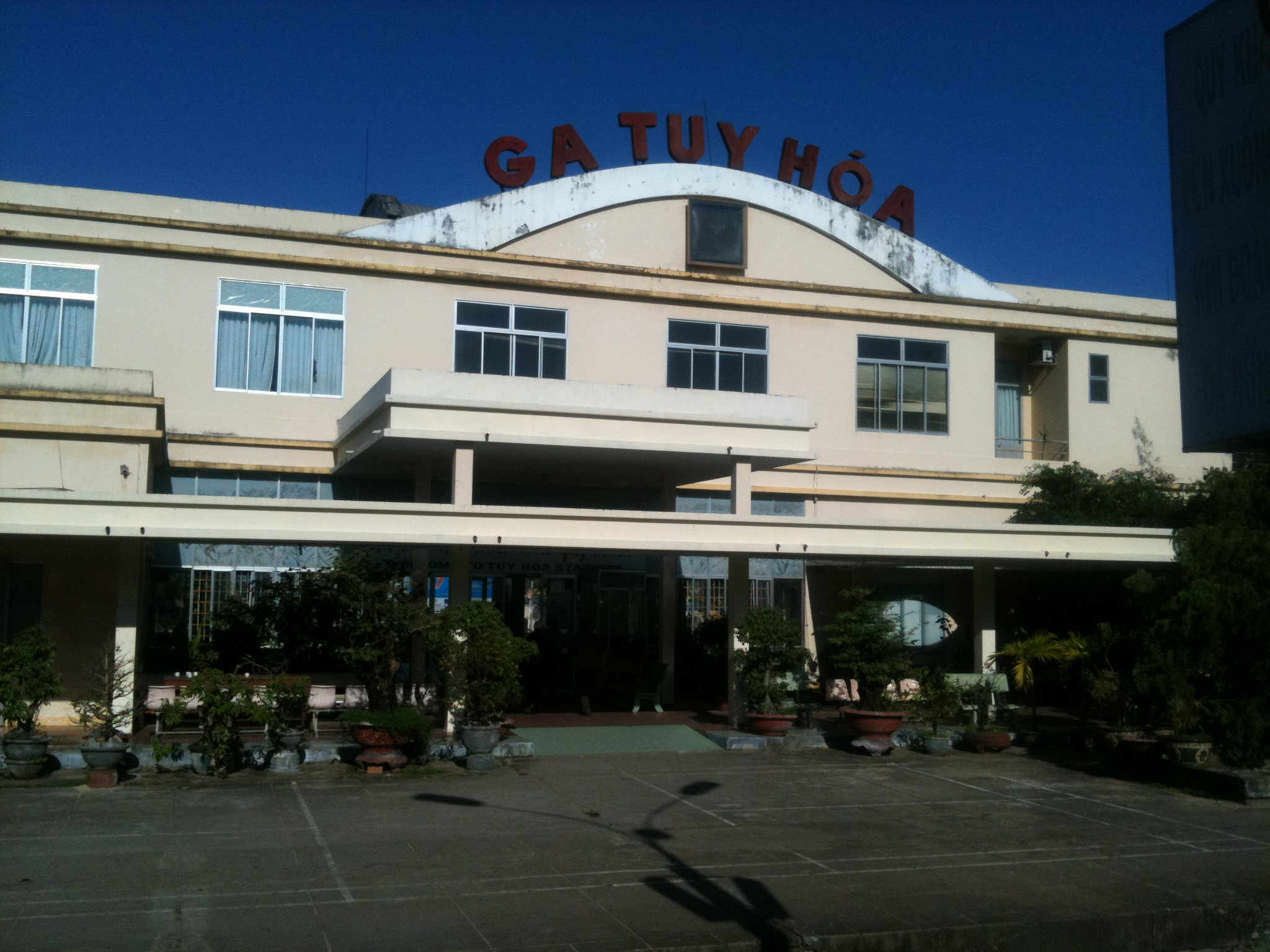

General information
- Location: Vietnam
- Coordinates: 13°05′17″N 109°17′50″E
Location

Tuy Hòa station is one of the main railway stations on the North–South railway (Reunification Express) in Vietnam. It is located in Tuy Hoà, the capital city of Phú Yên Province in south-central Vietnam.
