= Uông Bí (city) =

Former provincial city of the former Quảng Ninh province, Vietnam

Coordinates: 21°2′8″N 106°45′52″E

- Provincial city (Class-2)
- Uông Bí City; Thành phố Uông Bí
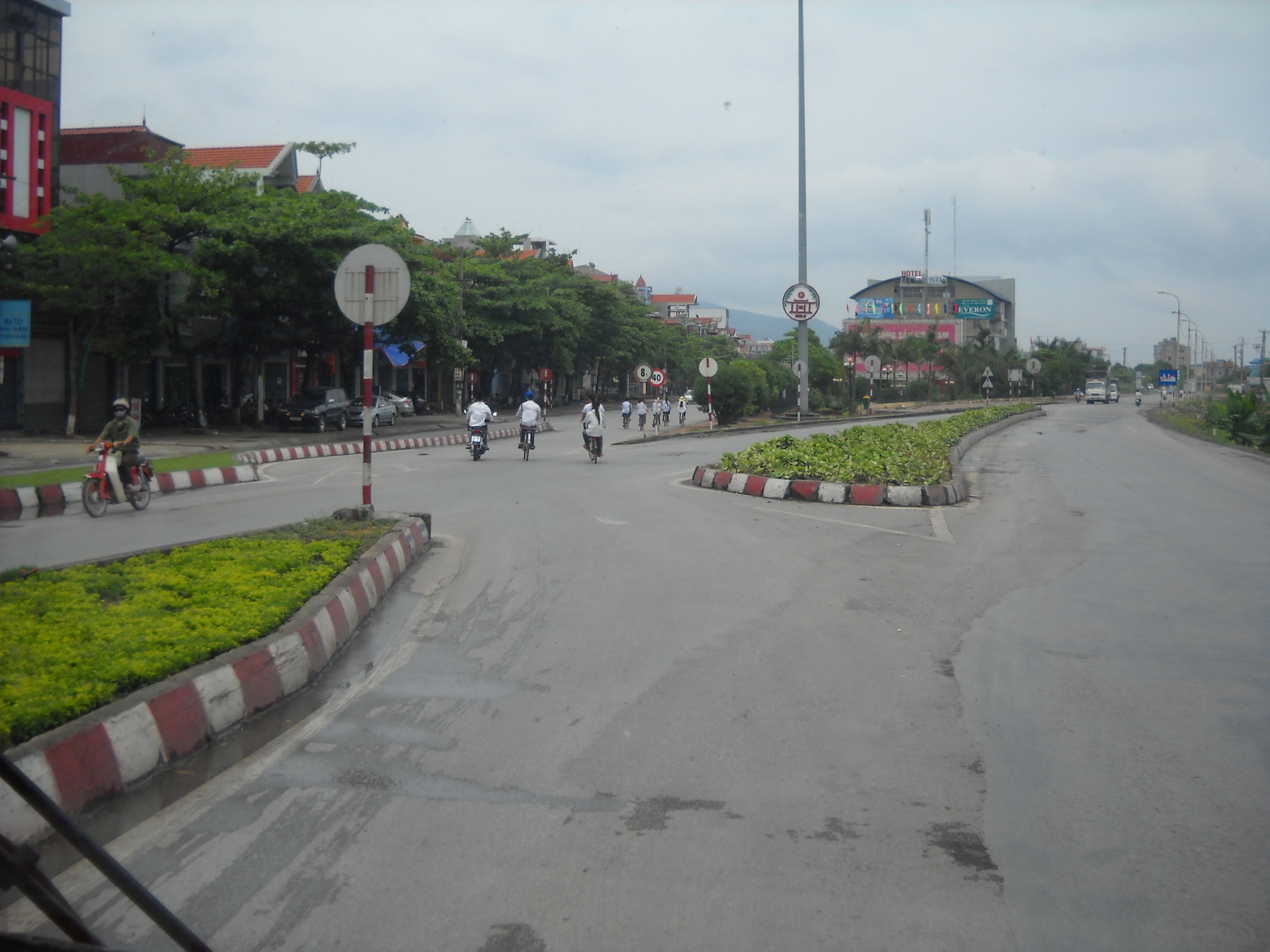

- Location within Vietnam
- Country: Vietnam
- Region: North-East
- Province: Quảng Ninh
- Founded: October 28, 1961: Uông Bí town was established; February 25, 2011: Uông Bí city was established
- Capital: Uông Bí

Government
  - Chairman of the People's Committee: Phạm Tuấn Đạt
  - Chairman of the People's Council: Nghiêm Xuân Cường
  - Secretary: Nghiêm Xuân Cường

Area
  - Provincial city (Class-2): 99.0 sq mi (256.3 km^{2})

Population (2019 census)
  - Provincial city (Class-2): 120,982
  - Density: 1,223/sq mi (472.0/km^{2})
  - Urban: 113,416
- Time zone: UTC+07:00 (Indochina Time)
- Climate: Cwa
- Website: uongbi.gov.vn

Uông Bí is a former provincial city of the former Quảng Ninh province in the north-eastern region of Vietnam. As of 2019 the city had a population of 120,982. The City covers an area of 240 km^{2}. Uong Bi was promoted from a town to a provincial city on February 25, 2011.

== Administrative divisions ==
The City contains 9 wards:

- Phương Nam
- Phương Đông
- Yên Thanh
- Nam Khê
- Quang Trung
- Trưng Vương
- Thanh Sơn
- Bắc Sơn
- Vàng Danh

and 1 commune:

- Thượng Yên Công

== Climate ==
Climate data for Uông Bí
Month	Jan	Feb	Mar	Apr	May	Jun	Jul	Aug	Sep	Oct	Nov	Dec	Year
Record high °C (°F)	30.8 (87.4)	31.8 (89.2)	33.6 (92.5)	36.3 (97.3)	37.5 (99.5)	39.5 (103.1)	37.8 (100.0)	37.8 (100.0)	36.7 (98.1)	35.1 (95.2)	32.8 (91.0)	32.1 (89.8)	39.5 (103.1)
Mean daily maximum °C (°F)	20.3 (68.5)	20.6 (69.1)	22.8 (73.0)	26.6 (79.9)	30.5 (86.9)	31.9 (89.4)	32.0 (89.6)	31.6 (88.9)	30.9 (87.6)	29.0 (84.2)	26.1 (79.0)	22.6 (72.7)	27.1 (80.8)
Daily mean °C (°F)	16.7 (62.1)	17.5 (63.5)	20.1 (68.2)	23.7 (74.7)	27.1 (80.8)	28.6 (83.5)	28.8 (83.8)	28.2 (82.8)	27.1 (80.8)	24.7 (76.5)	21.3 (70.3)	18.0 (64.4)	23.5 (74.3)
Mean daily minimum °C (°F)	14.2 (57.6)	15.5 (59.9)	18.2 (64.8)	21.6 (70.9)	24.5 (76.1)	25.9 (78.6)	26.1 (79.0)	25.7 (78.3)	24.3 (75.7)	21.6 (70.9)	17.9 (64.2)	14.7 (58.5)	20.8 (69.4)
Record low °C (°F)	3.3 (37.9)	5.4 (41.7)	6.1 (43.0)	11.4 (52.5)	16.6 (61.9)	19.6 (67.3)	21.9 (71.4)	21.6 (70.9)	16.7 (62.1)	12.7 (54.9)	6.6 (43.9)	1.1 (34.0)	1.1 (34.0)
Average rainfall mm (inches)	24.6 (0.97)	23.6 (0.93)	44.2 (1.74)	88.3 (3.48)	202.6 (7.98)	277.7 (10.93)	313.8 (12.35)	360.7 (14.20)	229.5 (9.04)	97.2 (3.83)	35.5 (1.40)	20.1 (0.79)	1,715.7 (67.55)
Average precipitation days	7.0	9.2	13.6	11.6	13.0	15.8	16.8	18.8	14.2	8.7	5.3	4.4	138.8
Average relative humidity (%)	79.4	82.7	85.7	86.0	83.5	83.7	83.6	85.9	83.3	79.1	76.6	75.7	82.0
Mean monthly sunshine hours	72.5	57.4	35.0	77.3	155.9	149.7	159.8	160.3	161.9	166.5	142.2	111.7	1,452.5
Source: Vietnam Institute for Building Science and Technology, Nchmf.gov.vn (August record high)
