= Đức Xuân =

Coordinates: 22.1400°N 105.8472°E

- Urban ward
- Interactive map of Đức Xuân
- Country: Vietnam
- Province: Thái Nguyên
- Time zone: UTC+07:00 (Indochina Time)

Đức Xuân is an urban ward (phường) of Thái Nguyên Province, in Vietnam.

In June 2025, Đức Xuân Ward was established through the merger of the entire natural area and population of Nguyễn Thị Minh Khai Ward (natural area: 12.71 km²; population: 6,266), Huyền Tụng Ward (natural area: 16.20 km²; population: 5,278), and Đức Xuân Ward (natural area: 5.55 km²; population: 11,116) of Bắc Kạn City.
