= Chí Linh (city) =

Coordinates: 21.133°N 106.383°E

- Provincial city (Class-3)
- Chí Linh City; Thành phố Chí Linh
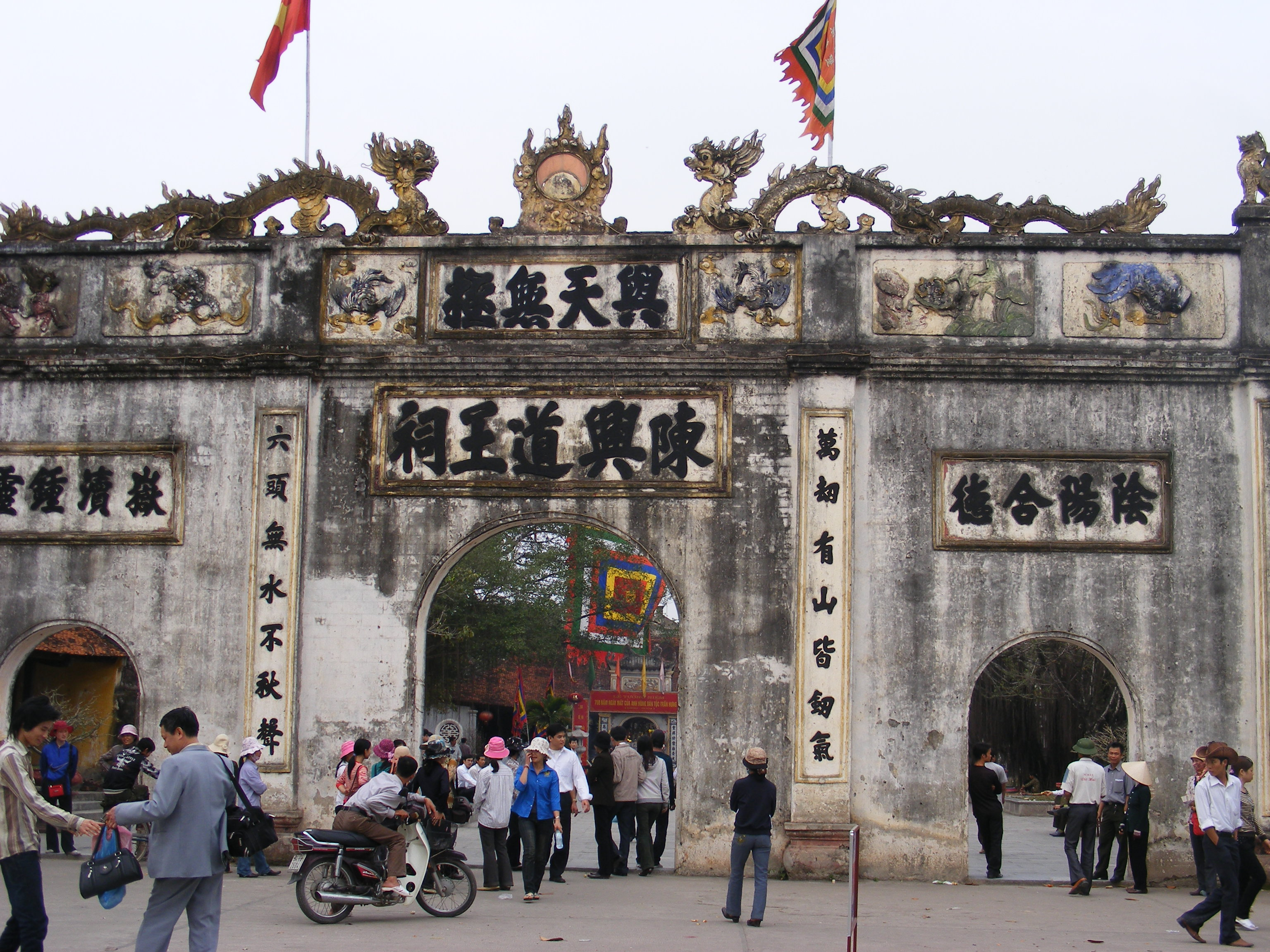
- Kiếp Bạc Temple belongs to Côn Sơn – Kiếp Bạc relic area
- Interactive map of Chí Linh
- Country: Vietnam
- Region: Red River Delta
- Province: Hải Dương
- Founded: February 12, 2010: Chí Linh town was established; March 1, 2019: Chí Linh city was established
- Capital: Sao Đỏ

Government
  - Secretary: Hoàng Quốc Thưởng
  - Chairman of the People's Council: Nguyễn văn Hồng
  - Chairman of People's Committee: Nguyễn Văn Kiên

Area
  - Provincial city (Class-3): 109.23 sq mi (282.91 km^{2})

Population (2019)
  - Provincial city (Class-3): 220,421
  - Urban: 65.5%
- Time zone: UTC+07:00 (Indochina Time)
- Climate: Cwa
- Website: chilinh.haiduong.gov.vn

Chí Linh is a former city in Hải Dương Province, in the Red River Delta region of Vietnam. In 2010, Chí Linh District was upgraded to a district-level town and in 2019, Chí Linh town became the second provincial city of Hải Dương Province. Chí Linh is a district in which six rivers converge, with features such as hills, mountains, and forests. The capital of the city is Sao Đỏ (Red Star).

There are many temples and pagodas in Chí Linh, with many of them concerning Vietnam's National Heroes, including Trần Hưng Đạo, Nguyễn Trãi and Chu Văn An. Côn Sơn and Kiếp Bạc pagodas are famous all over Vietnam.

One of the best golf courses in North Vietnam, Star Golf, was opened in Sao Đỏ in 2003.

Phả Lại, the biggest thermal power plant in North Vietnam is located in this city.

As of 2019, the city had a population of 220,421. The city covers an area of 282.91 km^{2}. The city capital lies at Sao Đỏ ward.

== History ==
Chi Linh city was initially called Bang Chau or Bang Ha and Phuong Son. Since 15th century, this area has been called as Chi Linh.

== Climate ==
Climate data for Chí Linh
Month	Jan	Feb	Mar	Apr	May	Jun	Jul	Aug	Sep	Oct	Nov	Dec	Year
Record high °C (°F)	31.2 (88.2)	33.3 (91.9)	35.2 (95.4)	37.8 (100.0)	40.0 (104.0)	42.2 (108.0)	39.0 (102.2)	38.6 (101.5)	37.6 (99.7)	36.0 (96.8)	34.0 (93.2)	30.0 (86.0)	42.2 (108.0)
Mean daily maximum °C (°F)	19.7 (67.5)	20.7 (69.3)	22.9 (73.2)	27.1 (80.8)	31.2 (88.2)	32.9 (91.2)	32.8 (91.0)	32.3 (90.1)	31.6 (88.9)	29.5 (85.1)	26.1 (79.0)	22.4 (72.3)	27.4 (81.3)
Daily mean °C (°F)	16.3 (61.3)	17.6 (63.7)	20.1 (68.2)	23.9 (75.0)	27.1 (80.8)	28.9 (84.0)	29.0 (84.2)	28.4 (83.1)	27.5 (81.5)	25.2 (77.4)	21.8 (71.2)	18.2 (64.8)	23.7 (74.7)
Mean daily minimum °C (°F)	14.1 (57.4)	15.6 (60.1)	18.2 (64.8)	21.8 (71.2)	24.4 (75.9)	26.0 (78.8)	26.2 (79.2)	25.8 (78.4)	24.8 (76.6)	22.4 (72.3)	18.9 (66.0)	15.3 (59.5)	21.1 (70.0)
Record low °C (°F)	4.7 (40.5)	4.3 (39.7)	6.5 (43.7)	11.5 (52.7)	16.6 (61.9)	20.6 (69.1)	22.3 (72.1)	21.5 (70.7)	16.5 (61.7)	13.9 (57.0)	9.4 (48.9)	5.1 (41.2)	4.3 (39.7)
Average rainfall mm (inches)	21.1 (0.83)	23.7 (0.93)	50.3 (1.98)	79.3 (3.12)	182.1 (7.17)	241.0 (9.49)	253.6 (9.98)	264.7 (10.42)	190.2 (7.49)	122.2 (4.81)	42.5 (1.67)	20.7 (0.81)	1,488 (58.58)
Average rainy days	6.4	9.5	13.8	12.7	13.5	14.7	15.5	16.7	12.3	8.9	5.4	3.8	133.2
Average relative humidity (%)	77.6	81.2	85.3	85.3	82.4	81.9	81.5	84.5	80.7	76.2	72.0	72.8	80.1
Mean monthly sunshine hours	69.7	48.6	44.7	81.8	177.2	176.1	194.5	176.0	187.1	171.5	153.6	131.8	1,621.4
Source: Vietnam Institute for Building Science and Technology

== Transportation ==
Transport and transportation in Chi Linh are diverse. Visitors can travel to Chi Linh by bus, taxi, train, or private car from Ha Noi capital.
