= Phổ Yên (city) =

- Provincial city (Class-3)
- Phổ Yên City; Thành phố Phổ Yên
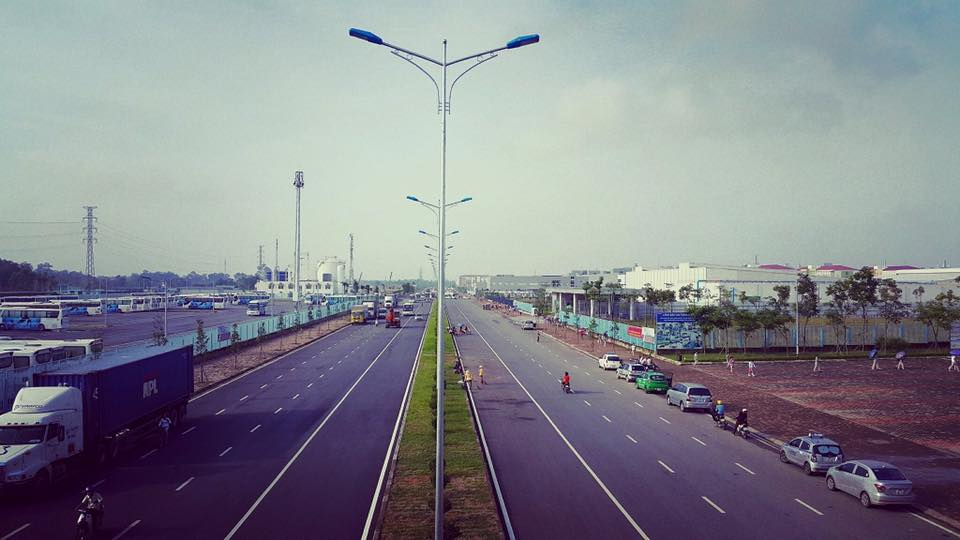
- Yên Bình Industrial Park

- Seal

- Location within Vietnam
- Coordinates: 21°24′56″N 105°52′26″E
- Country: Vietnam
- Region: Northeast
- Province: Thái Nguyên

Area
  - Total: 99.78 sq mi (258.42 km^{2})

Population
  - Total: 231,363
  - Density: 2,320/sq mi (895/km^{2})
- Time zone: UTC+7 (UTC + 7)

Phổ Yên is a former provincial city of Thái Nguyên Province in the northeastern region of Vietnam. As of 2021, the city had a population of 231,363. The city covers an area of 258.42 km^{2}.

== Administrative divisions ==
Phổ Yên is subdivided into 18 commune-level subdivisions, including the 13 wards of: Ba Hàng, Bãi Bông, Bắc Sơn, Đắc Sơn, Đông Cao, Đồng Tiến, Hồng Tiến, Nam Tiến, Tân Hương, Tân Phú, Tiên Phong, Thuận Thành, Trung Thành and 5 rural communes of: Minh Đức, Phúc Tân, Phúc Thuận, Thành Công, Vạn Phái.

== Economy ==
Phổ Yên is home to a Samsung factory.
