= List of companies of Vietnam =

List of notable companies based in Vietnam

Location of Vietnam

Vietnam is the easternmost country on the Indochina Peninsula in Southeast Asia. For much of its history, Vietnam was a predominantly agricultural civilization based on wet rice cultivation. There is also an industry for bauxite mining in Vietnam, an important material for the production of aluminum. The Vietnamese economy is shaped primarily by the Vietnamese Communist Party in Five Year Plans made through the plenary sessions of the Central Committee and national congresses.

Manufacturing, information technology and high-tech industries now form a large and fast-growing part of the national economy. Though Vietnam is a relative newcomer to the oil industry, it is currently the third-largest oil producer in Southeast Asia, with a total 2011 output of 318,000 barrels per day (50,600 m^{3}/d). In 2010, Vietnam was ranked as the 8th largest crude petroleum producers in the Asia and Pacific region. Like its Chinese neighbours, Vietnam continues to make use of centrally planned economic five-year plans.

For further information on the types of business entities in this country and their abbreviations, see "Business entities in Vietnam".

== Largest firms ==
This list shows firms in the 2017 Forbes Global 2000, which ranks firms based on four measures: sales, profit, assets and market value. The list only includes publicly traded firms.

Rank	Image	Name	Sales (US$M)	Profit (US$M)	Assets (US$M)	Market Cap (US$M)
1633		Vietinbank	2,700	304	41,700	3,000
1656		Joint Stock Commercial Bank for Foreign Trade of Vietnam (Vietcombank)	2,100	305	34,600	5,800
1682		Bank for Investment and Development of Vietnam (BIDV)	3,300	275	44,200	2,600
1888		Vinamilk	2,100	396	1,300	9,100

== Notable firms ==
This list includes notable companies with primary headquarters located in the country. The industry and sector follow the Industry Classification Benchmark taxonomy. Organizations which have ceased operations are included and noted as defunct.

Notable companies Status: P=Private, S=State; A=Active, D=Defunct
Name	Industry	Sector	Headquarters	Founded	Notes	Status	
Air Mekong	Consumer services	Airlines	Phú Quốc	2009	Scheduled airline, defunct 2013	P	D
Airports Corporation of Vietnam	Consumer services	Airlines	Ho Chi Minh City	2012	Government-owned airline	S	A
An Giang Coffee	Consumer services	Beverages	Đồng Nai Province	2004	Coffee	P	A
Appota Corporation	Technology	Software	Hanoi	2011	Mobile apps	P	A
Asia Commercial Bank (ACB)	Financials	Banks	Ho Chi Minh City	1993	Private bank	P	A
Bank for Investment and Development of Vietnam (BIDV)	Financials	Banks	Hanoi	1957	State bank	S	A
Bao Viet Holdings	Financials	Full line insurance	Hanoi	1964	Include Bao Viet Insurance, Life, Securities, and Bank	S	A
Bidiphar	Health care	Pharmaceuticals	Qui Nhơn	1995	Pharma	P	A
Bien Hoa Sugar	Consumer goods	Food products	Biên Hòa	1969	Sugar	P	A
Bien Viet Securities	Financials	Investment services	Hanoi	?	Investments	P	A
Binh Minh Plastic	Basic materials	Commodity chemicals	Ho Chi Minh City	1977	Plastics	P	A
Casumina	Consumer goods	Tires	Ho Chi Minh City	1976	Tire, rubber	P	A
Central Service Flight Company	Consumer services	Airlines	Da Nang	?	Charter helicopters	S	A
Cuulong Fish	Consumer goods	Farming & fishing	Long Xuyên	2003	Fishery	P	A
Đại Cát Tường	Consumer goods	Clothing & accessories	Quảng Ngãi	2005	Textiles, part of Vinatex	P	A
FPT Group	Technology	Software	Hanoi	1988	IT consulting and development	P	A
Gmobile	Telecommunications	Mobile telecommunications	Hanoi	2012	Mobile network	P	A
Habeco	Consumer goods	Brewers	Hanoi	1890	Beer	P	A
Hai Au Paper	Basic materials	Paper	Haiphong	?	Paper products	P	A
Hai Ha Confectionery	Consumer goods	Food products	Hanoi	1960	Confectionary	P	A
Hanoi Beer	Consumer goods	Beverages	Hanoi	2003	Beer	P	A
Hanoi Radio Television	Consumer services	Broadcasting & entertainment	Hanoi	1954	Radio and television	P	A
Hanoimilk	Consumer goods	Beverages	Vĩnh Phúc	?	Milk and dairy	P	A
Hanoi Stock Exchange	Financials	Stock exchange	Hanoi	2005	Owned by Vietnam Ministry of Finance	S	A
Highlands Coffee	Consumer services	Restaurants & bars	Hanoi	1998	Coffee chain	P	A
Hoang Anh Gia Lai Group	Conglomerates	-	Pleiku	1990	Consumer goods, financials, industrials, basic materials	P	A
Hue Beer	Consumer goods	Brewers	Huế	1990	Brewery	P	A
Indochina Airlines	Consumer services	Airlines	Ho Chi Minh City	2008	Defunct 2009	P	D
Isuzu Vietnam	Consumer goods	Automobiles	Ho Chi Minh City	1995		P	A
Khaisilk	Consumer services	Restaurants & bars	Ho Chi Minh City	?	Restaurants	P	A
Kim Dong Publishing House	Consumer services	Publishing	Da Nang	1957	Children's books	P	A
Kinh Do Corporation	Consumer goods	Food products	Ho Chi Minh City	1993	Food conglomerate	P	A
LienVietPostBank	Financials	Banks	Hanoi	2008	Bank	P	A
Mekong Auto	Consumer goods	Automobiles	Ho Chi Minh City	1991		P	A
Mekong Capital	Financials	Equity investment instruments	Ho Chi Minh City	2001	Private equity	P	A
MobiFone	Telecommunications	Mobile telecommunications	Hanoi	1993	Mobile network	P	A
Nafovanny	Health care	Life sciences	Long Thành	1994	Primate captive-breeding	P	A
Northern Vietnam Helicopter Company	Consumer services	Airlines	Hanoi	?	Charter helicopter	P	A
Orient Commercial Joint Stock Bank	Financials	Banks	Ho Chi Minh City	1996	Bank	P	A
Pacific Airlines	Consumer services	Airlines	Ho Chi Minh City	1991	Low-cost airline	P	A
Petrolimex	Oil & gas	Oil & gas producers	Hanoi	1956	State petroleum	S	A
Petrolimex Gas	Oil & gas	Oil & gas producers	Hanoi	1998	LNG, Part of Petrolimex	S	A
Petrovietnam	Oil & gas	Oil & gas producers	Hanoi	1977	State oil & gas	S	A
PetroVietnam Finance Corporation	Financials	Specialty finance	Hanoi	2000	Non-banking finance, part of Petrovietnam	S	A
PetroVietnam Insurance	Financials	Full line insurance	Hanoi	1996	Insurance, part of Petrovietnam	S	A
Phu My Hung Corporation	Industrials	Heavy construction	Ho Chi Minh City	1993	Infrastructure	S	A
Phu Phong Glass Joint Stock Company	Industrials	Building materials & fixtures	Ho Chi Minh City	?	Glass	P	A
Phuoc Sang Films	Consumer services	Broadcasting & entertainment	Ho Chi Minh City	2004	Film studio	P	A
PJICO	Financials	Full line insurance	Hanoi	1995	Insurance, Part of Petrolimex	S	A
Sabeco Brewery	Consumer goods	Brewers	Ho Chi Minh City	1977	Saigon Beer	S	A
SAMCO	Consumer goods	Automobiles	Ho Chi Minh City	1975		P	A
Sara Vietnam	Industrials	Business training	Hanoi	2002	Technology education	P	A
Savimex	Consumer goods	Furnishings	Ho Chi Minh City	1985	Furniture	P	A
Sendo.vn	Consumer goods	E-commerce	Ho Chi Minh City	2012	A subsidiary of FPT Corporation	P	A
S-Fone	Telecommunications	Mobile telecommunications	Ho Chi Minh City	2003	Mobile network	P	A
Shipbuilding Industry Corporation	Industrials	Shipbuilding	Hanoi	2013	Established based on restructured Vietnam Shipbuilding Industry Group	P	A
Southern Seed	Consumer goods	Farming & fishing	Ho Chi Minh City	1998	Seeds	P	A
Southern Service Flight Company	Consumer services	Airlines	Vũng Tàu	?	Charter helicopters	S	A
Tan Tao Group	Industrials	Heavy construction	Ho Chi Minh City	1996	Infrastructure development	P	A
THACO	Consumer goods	Automobiles	Ho Chi Minh City	1997		P	A
Thế Giới Publishers	Consumer services	Publishing	Hanoi	1957	Publisher	P	A
TMA Solutions	Technology	Software	Ho Chi Minh City	1997	Software development and outsourcing	P	A
Tre Publishing House	Consumer services	Publishing	Ho Chi Minh City	1986	Book and magazine publisher	P	A
Trung Nguyên	Consumer goods	Beverages	Ho Chi Minh City	1996	Coffee	P	A
TVM Comics	Consumer services	Publishing	Ho Chi Minh City	2007	Comic publisher	P	A
Vietcombank	Financials	Banks	Hanoi	1963	Commercial bank	P	A
Vietinbank	Financials	Banks	Hanoi	1988	State bank	S	A
VietJet Air	Consumer services	Airlines	Hanoi	2011	Low-cost airline	P	A
Vietnam Air Services Company	Consumer services	Airlines	Ho Chi Minh City	1987	Airline, part of Vietnam Airlines	S	A
Vietnam Airlines	Consumer services	Airlines	Hanoi	1956	Flag-carrier airline	S	A
Vietnam Asset Management	Financials	Equity investment instruments	Ho Chi Minh City	2006	Fund management	P	A
Vietnam Bank for Agriculture and Rural Development	Financials	Banks	Hanoi	1988	Agribank	P	A
Vietnam Electricity	Utilities	Electricity	Hanoi	1954	Power company	S	A
Vietnam Helicopter Corporation	Consumer services	Airlines	Hanoi	1979	State charter helicopters	S	A
Vietnam Multimedia Corporation	Consumer services	Media	Hanoi	2003	General media firm	S	A
Vietnam Petroleum Institute	Oil & gas	Oil & gas exploration & production	Hanoi	1978	Research and exploration	S	A
Vietnam Posts and Telecommunications Group (VNPT)	Conglomerates	-	Hanoi	2006	Telecommunications, financials, technology	S	A
Vietnam Railways	Industrials	Railroads	Hanoi	1881	State railway	S	A
Vietnamobile	Telecommunications	Mobile telecommunications	Hanoi	2009	Mobile network, acquired EVNTelecom in 2011)	P	A
Vietsovpetro	Oil & gas	Oil & gas exploration & production	Vũng Tàu	1981	Oil & gas exploration	P	A
Viettel	Telecommunications	Mobile telecommunications	Hanoi	2004	State mobile network	S	A
Viglacera Corporation	Industrials	Building materials & fixtures	Hanoi	1974	Construction materials	P	A
Vinacafe	Consumer goods	Food products	Biên Hòa	1969	Coffee and cereals	P	A
Vinacomin	Basic materials	Coal	Hạ Long	1995	State coal mining	S	A
Vinamilk	Consumer goods	Beverages	Ho Chi Minh City	1976	Dairy	S	A
Vinaphone	Telecommunications	Mobile telecommunications	Hanoi	1996	Part of Vietnam Posts and Telecommunications Group	S	A
Vinare	Financials	Reinsurance	Hanoi	1995	Commercial reinsurance	P	A
Vinatex	Consumer goods	Clothing & accessories	Hanoi	1995	Textiles	S	A
Vinavico Group	Industrials	Heavy construction	Hanoi	2003	Infrastructure and power construction	P	A
Vinaxuki	Consumer goods	Automobiles	Hanoi	2004	Defunct 2015	P	D
VinFast	Consumer goods	Automobiles	Haiphong	2017	Subsidiary of Vingroup	P	A
Vingroup	Conglomerates	-	Hanoi	1993	Automobiles, consumer goods, financials, industrials, basic materials, real estate development, retail, services, healthcare, hospitality, pharmaceuticals, technology	P	A
VNG Corporation	Technology	Internet	Ho Chi Minh City	2004	Online content and games	P	A
World Auto	Consumer goods	Automobiles	Ho Chi Minh City	2006	Volkswagen assembly	P	A

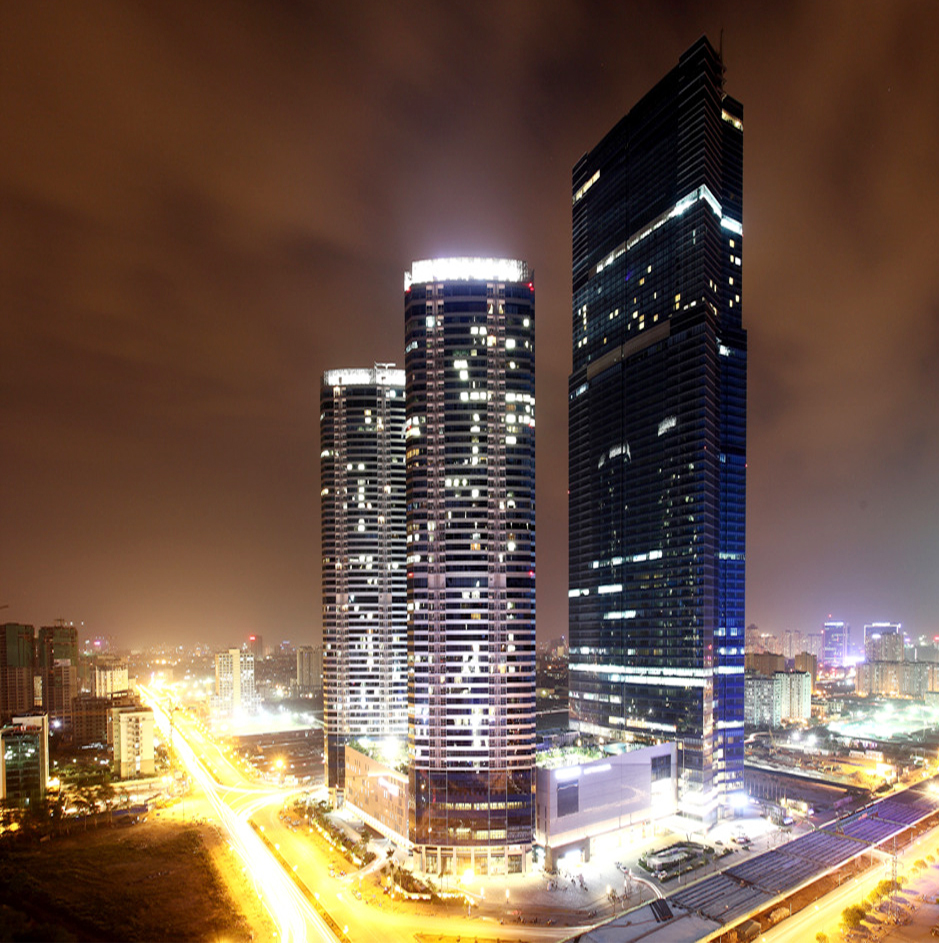
Keangnam Hanoi Landmark Tower in the Từ Liêm District.

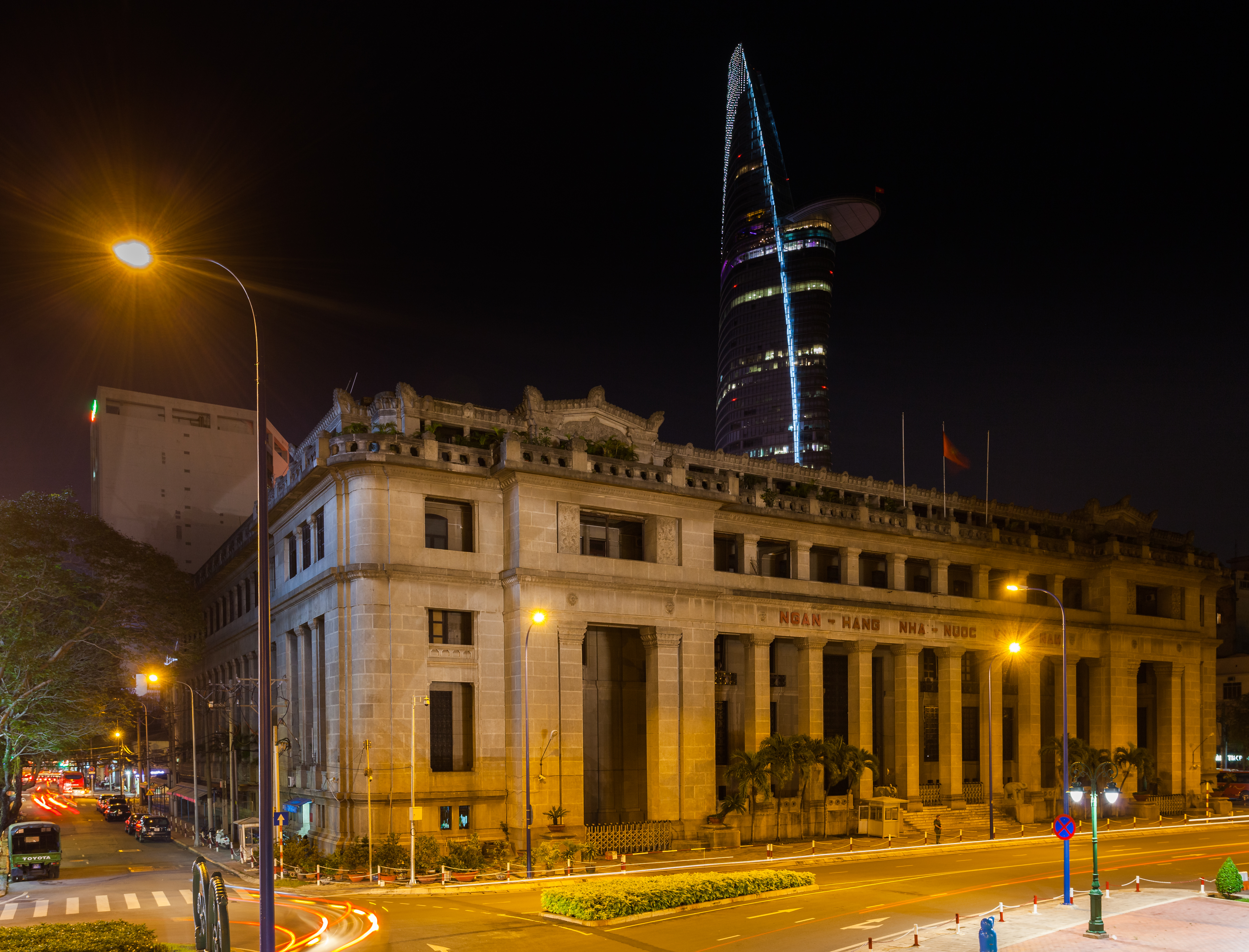
State Bank of Vietnam in Ho Chi Minh City.

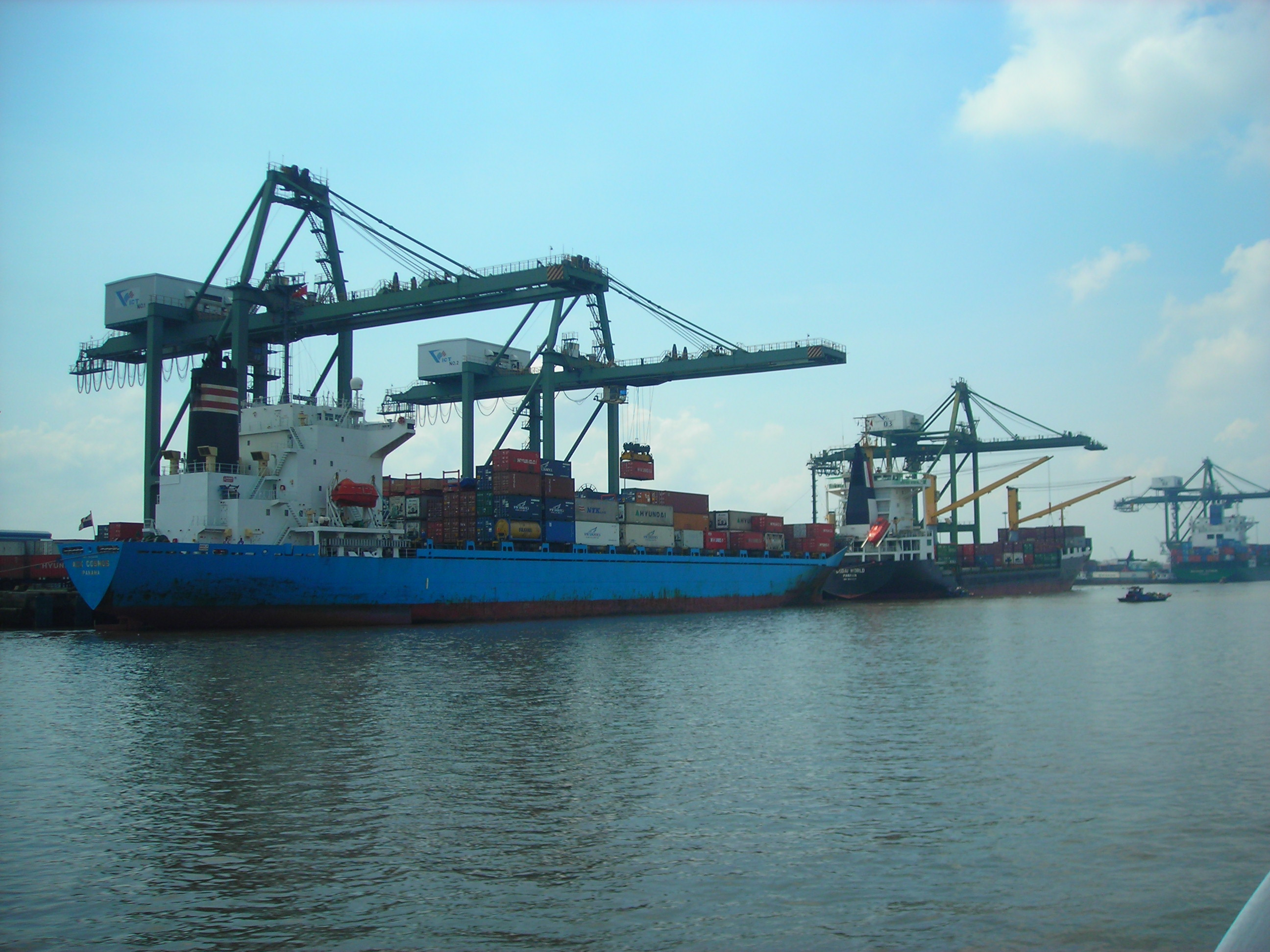
Saigon Port in Ho Chi Minh City.

== See also ==
- List of airlines of Vietnam
- List of banks in Vietnam
