= Trương Quang Trọng (ward) =

Ward in Quảng Ngãi province, Vietnam

- Ward
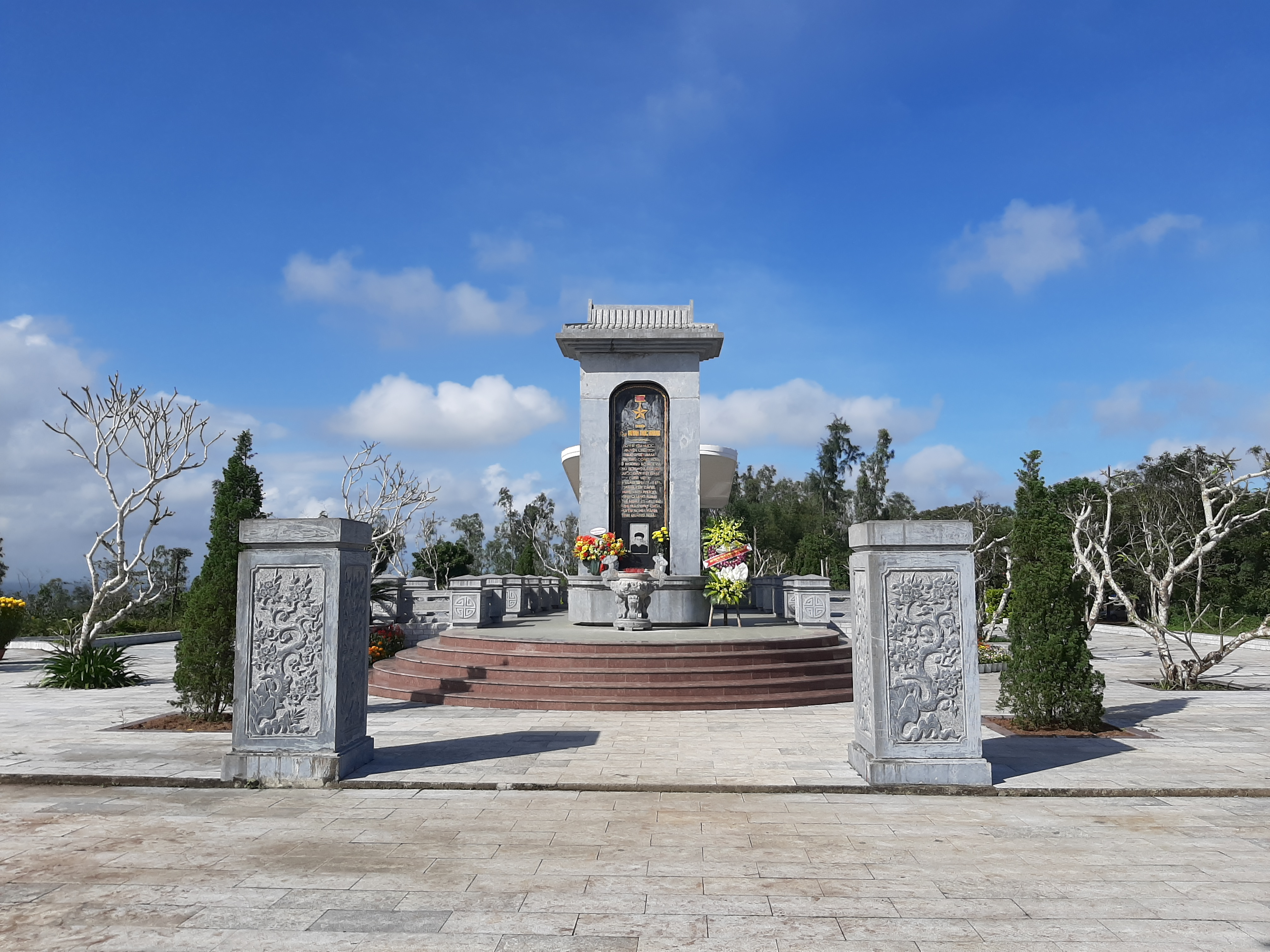
- Huỳnh Thúc Kháng's tomb is located on Thiên Ấn mountain.
- Interactive map of Trương Quang Trọng
- Country: Vietnam
- Region: South Central Coast and Central Highlands
- Province: Quảng Ngãi
- Established: December 12, 2013
- Named for: Trương Quang Trọng

Government
  - Type: Ward
  - Body: People's Council of Trương Quang Trọng ward

Area
  - Total: 34.65 km^{2} (13.38 sq mi)

Population (2025)
  - Total: 49,308
  - Density: 1,423/km^{2} (3,686/sq mi)
- Time zone: UTC+07:00

Trương Quang Trọng is a ward in Quảng Ngãi province, Vietnam. It is one of 96 ward and communes in the province.

== Geography ==
Trương Quang Trọng is a ward located in the eastern part of Quảng Ngãi province, 122km southwest of Kon Tum ward and 40km north of Đức Phổ ward. It borders with Tịnh Khê commune to the east; Cẩm Thành, Nghĩa Lộ wards and An Phú commune to the south; Sơn Tịnh commune to the west and Thọ Phong commune to the north.

== History ==
Prior to 2013, the area of Trương Quang Trọng ward included Sơn Tịnh commune-level town (township), Tịnh Ấn Đông, Tịnh Ấn Tây, and Tịnh An communes in Sơn Tịnh district, Quảng Ngãi province.

On December 12, 2013, the Government of Vietnam issued Resolution 123/NQ-CP on adjusting and expanding the administrative boundaries of Quảng Ngãi provincial city:

- Transfer 101.05 km² and 99,701 people from Sơn Tịnh township and Tịnh Ấn Đông, Tịnh Ấn Tây, Tịnh An, Tịnh Long, Tịnh Châu, Tịnh Thiện, Tịnh Khê, Tịnh Hòa, Tịnh Kỳ communes of Sơn Tịnh district to Quảng Ngãi provincial city.
- The Trương Quang Trọng ward was established based on an area of 9.26 km² and a population of 14,148 people of Sơn Tịnh township.
- The capital of Sơn Tịnh district is Sơn Tịnh township was moved to Tịnh Hà commune (Tịnh Hà become a township from November 11th, 2024).
- Trương Quang Trọng ward, Tịnh Ấn Đông, Tịnh Ấn Tây and Tịnh An communes belong to Quảng Ngãi provincial city.

On June 12, 2025, the National Assembly of Vietnam issued Resolution No. 202/2025/QH15 on the reorganization of provincial-level administrative units. Quảng Ngãi province was established by merging the entire area and population of Kon Tum province and Quảng Ngãi province.

On June 16, 2025, the Standing Committee of the National Assembly of Vietnam issued Resolution No. 1677/NQ-UBTVQH15 on the reorganization of commune-level administrative units in Quảng Ngãi province. Trương Quang Trọng ward was established by merging the entire area and population of Trương Quang Trọng ward and Tịnh An, Tịnh Ấn Đông, Tịnh Ấn Tây communes (formerly part of Quảng Ngãi provincial city).
