= Nghĩa Lộ, Quảng Ngãi =

Ward in Quảng Ngãi province, Vietnam

Nghĩa Lộ
- Ward
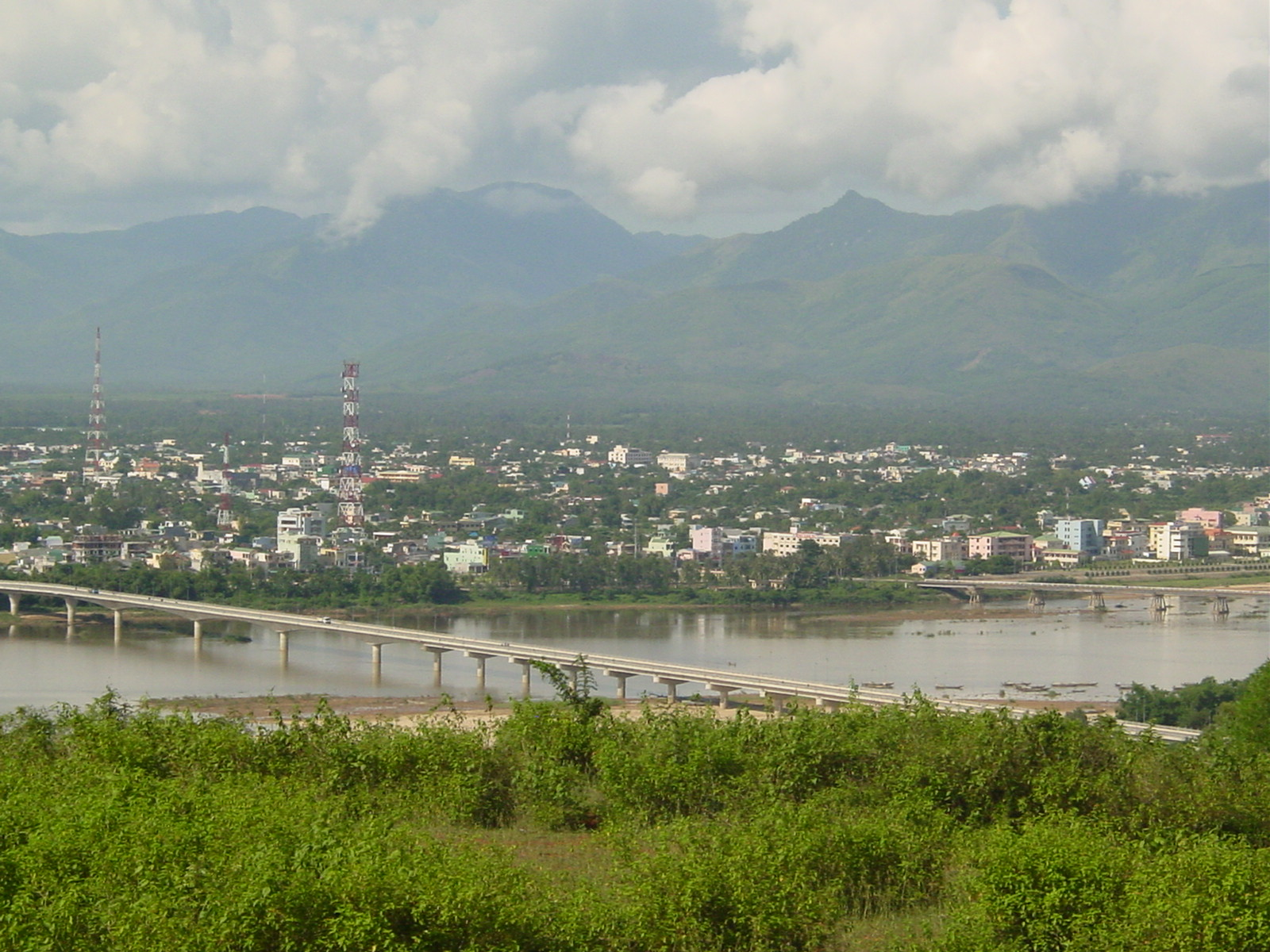
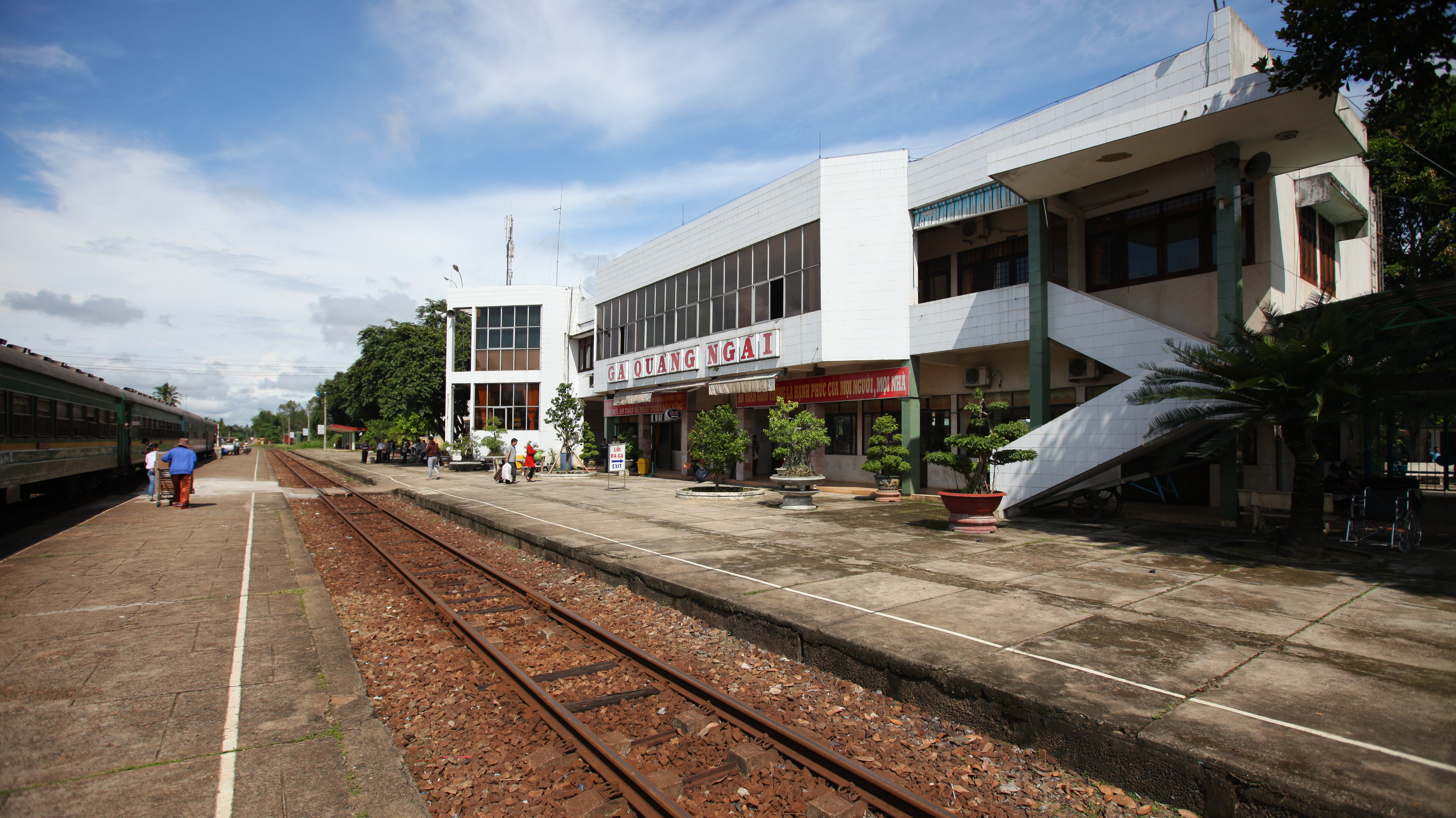
- A view in Nghĩa Lộ ward Quảng Ngãi railway station
- Interactive map of Nghĩa Lộ
- Country: Vietnam
- Region: South Central Coast and Central Highlands
- Province: Quảng Ngãi
- Established: June 16, 2025

Government
  - Type: Ward
  - Body: People's Council of Nghĩa Lộ ward

Area
  - Total: 17.07 km^{2} (6.59 sq mi)

Population (2025)
  - Total: 73,556
  - Density: 4,309/km^{2} (11,160/sq mi)
- Time zone: UTC+07:00

Nghĩa Lộ is a ward in Quảng Ngãi province, Vietnam. It is one of 96 communes and wards in the province following the 2025 reorganization.

== Geography ==
Nghĩa Lộ is a ward in Quảng Ngãi province, located 190km northeast of Kon Tum ward. It borders with Cẩm Thành ward to the east, Nghĩa Giang to the south and west, Trương Quang Trọng ward and Sơn Tịnh commune to the north.

== History ==
Prior to 2025, the area that is now Nghĩa Lộ ward was formerly Lê Hồng Phong, Trần Phú, Quảng Phú and Nghĩa Lộ wards of Quảng Ngãi provincial city, Quảng Ngãi province.

On June 12, 2025, the National Assembly of Vietnam issued Resolution No. 202/2025/QH15 on the reorganization of provincial-level administrative units. Quảng Ngãi province was established by merging the entire area and population of Kon Tum province and Quảng Ngãi province.

On June 16, 2025, the Standing Committee of the National Assembly of Vietnam issued Resolution No. 1677/NQ-UBTVQH15 on the reorganization of commune-level administrative units in Quảng Ngãi province. Nghĩa Lộ ward was established by merging the entire area and population of Lê Hồng Phong, Trần Phú, Quảng Phú and Nghĩa Lộ wards (formerly part of Quảng Ngãi provincial city).
