= PVI =

PVI may refer to:

== People ==
- Pope Paul VI, head of the Roman Catholic Church 1963-1978
- Peter van Inwagen, American philosopher

== Companies ==
- PVI Virtual Media Services, virtual advertising and imaging company
- Power Vehicle Innovation, the French electric and natural gas bus and truck manufacturer
- PetroVietnam Insurance, a subsidiary of PetroVietnam

== Medicine ==
- Pleth variability index
- Pulmonary vein isolation or pulmonary vein ablation, a surgical procedure to treat atrial fibrillation

== Other ==
- Cook Partisan Voting Index
- Paul VI Catholic High School in Fairfax, Virginia, named for Pope Paul VI
- Paul VI High School in Haddonfield, New Jersey, named for Pope Paul VI
- Polyvinyl imidazole, a polymer of vinylimidazole
- Polyvinyl isobutyl ether, a type of polyvinyl ether
