= HNX =

HNX may refer to:

- Hanoi Stock Exchange, a financial services company in Hanoi, Vietnam
- Hunts Cross railway station, Liverpool, England, National Rail station code
