= Phu Phong Glass Joint Stock Company =

Vietnamese glass manufacturing company

- Native name: Sản xuất Thương mại Dịch vụ Phú Phong
- Industry: Glass Manufacturing
- Headquarters: Ho Chi Minh City, Vietnam

Phu Phong Glass Joint Stock Company (CTCP Sản xuất Thương mại Dịch vụ Phú Phong) is a company based in the outskirts of Ho Chi Minh City that makes architectural glass and float glass for use in furniture and construction materials. Phu Phong's main offices are in Ho Chi Minh City. Its stock is listed at the Hanoi Securities Trading Center, symbol is PPG.

== See also ==
- List of companies of Vietnam
