= Quảng Ngãi =

Quảng Ngãi may refer to:

- Quảng Ngãi province, a province in central Vietnam
- Quảng Ngãi (city), former provincial city of Quảng Ngãi province
