= Bình Minh (disambiguation) =

Bình Minh was a district-level town of Vĩnh Long province, in the Mekong Delta region of Vietnam.

Bình Minh may also refer to:

== Places in Vietnam ==
- Bình Minh, Vĩnh Long, a ward in Vĩnh Long province, Vietnam
- Bình Minh, Tây Ninh, a ward in Tây Ninh province, Vietnam
- Bình Minh, Hà Nội, a commune in Hà Nội capital municipality, Vietnam
- Bình Minh, Đồng Nai, a commune in Đồng Nai municipality, Vietnam
- Bình Minh, Nghệ An, a commune in Nghệ An province, Vietnam
- Bình Minh, Ninh Bình, a commune in Ninh Bình province, Vietnam
- Bình Minh, Quảng Ngãi, a commune in Quảng Ngãi province, Vietnam

=== Former place names in Vietnam ===
- Bình Minh, a commune in Khoái Châu district, Hưng Yên province (today part of Mễ Sở, Hưng Yên province)
- Bình Minh, a commune in Nam Trực district, Nam Định province (today part of Nam Minh commune, Ninh Bình province)
- Bình Minh, a commune in Thăng Bình district, Quảng Nam province (today part of Thăng An commune, Đà Nẵng municipality)
- Bình Minh, a commune in Bình Sơn district, Quảng Ngãi province (today part of Bình Minh commune, Quảng Ngãi province)
- Bình Minh, a commune in Kiến Xương district, Thái Bình province (today part of Kiến Xương commune, Hưng Yên province)

== Others ==
- Phạm Bình Minh (born 1959), Vietnamese diplomat and politician, former Permanent Deputy Prime Minister of the Vietnamese Government
- Trần Bình Minh, member of the 11th and 12th Central Committee of the Communist Party of Vietnam
- Binh Minh Plastic, a company headquartered in Hồ Chí Minh city
