= Trương Quang Trọng =

Vietnamese revolutionary (1906 – 1931)

Trương Quảng Trọng (1906 – 1931); was a Vietnamese revolutionary.

== Early life and background ==
Trương Quang Trọng was born in 1906 in Phú Nhơn, Sơn Tịnh (now part of Trương Quang Trọng ward), Quảng Ngãi province.

Due to his family circumstances, he received a basic Western-style education from an early age. In 1923, he passed the entrance examination to the École Primaire Supérieure in Huế, where he studied in the Thành Chung program. There, together with several like-minded classmates, he founded the Central Vietnam Students' Mutual Aid Association, which had progressive and patriotic tendencies.

In 1925, he went to Hanoi, where he studied at Bưởi School and then passed the entrance examination to the Faculty of Medicine of the École Supérieure de Médecine de l'Indochine. During his time in Hanoi, he came into contact with revolutionary Tôn Quang Phiệt and joined the Phục Việt Association. In 1926, he participated, together with Phạm Văn Đồng and several other friends, in the movement demanding a period of mourning for revolutionary Phan Chu Trinh and an amnesty for Phan Bội Châu, for which he was expelled from school.

In the summer of 1926, he returned to Quảng Ngãi and brought together members of Công Ái Society (established by Nguyễn Thiệu and others), including Hồ Độ, Nguyễn Bút, Nguyễn Nghiêm, Trần Kỳ Truyện, and Lê Trọng Kha, to establish the Phục Việt organization in Quảng Ngãi. Most of its members were progressive Confucian scholars and young people educated in the modern system. In 1927, after Nguyễn Thiệu, a representative of the Central Committee of the Vietnam Revolutionary Youth League in charge of Central Vietnam, came to work with Phục Việt Quảng Ngãi, he and his comrades shifted their activities and established the provincial chapter of the Vietnamese Revolutionary Youth League in Quảng Ngãi, with Trương Quang Trọng serving as its secretary.

Also in 1927, he was sent by the organization to attend a training course of the Vietnamese Revolutionary Youth League in Guangzhou, China. In May 1929, he was appointed as a delegate of the Quảng Ngãi provincial chapter to attend the National Congress of the Vietnam Revolutionary Youth League in Hong Kong.

After returning to Vietnam, in late July 1929, he gathered the most active members of the Quảng Ngãi provincial chapter of the Vietnam Revolutionary Youth League at Xương Rồng Mountain in Đức Phổ district and established the "Communist Preparatory Organization", which undertook the work of the campaign committee for establishing the Quảng Ngãi provincial communist party organization.

The activities of the Vietnam Revolutionary Youth League in Quảng Ngãi quickly attracted the attention of the French colonial authorities. From late August to mid-October 1929, most members of the Vietnam Revolutionary Youth League in Quảng Ngãi were arrested. Trương Quang Trọng was also arrested by the French colonial authorities on August 19, 1929, along with more than 20 other comrades. After being detained for a period at Quảng Ngãi Prison, he was sentenced by a colonial court to nine years of hard labor and four years of house arrest. In early 1931, he and several other prisoners were transferred to Quy Nhơn Prison, and in June 1931 he was exiled to Kon Tum prison.

In late 1931, the French prison authorities planned to force the political prisoners in Kon Tum to perform hard labor building roads in Đắk Pék, which at the time was still a remote area characterized by dense forests and harsh, unhealthy conditions. He and several comrades, including Đặng Thái Thuyến, Nguyễn Lung (Nghệ An), Nguyễn Long (Hà Tĩnh), and Lê Trọng Kha (Quảng Ngãi), decided to organize resistance, and he was elected head of the resistance committee.

On 12 December 1931, when the prison authorities attempted to force the prisoners to perform hard labor, he took responsibility for leading the resistance and was shot dead by the French prison authorities at the age of just 25. When the remaining prisoners rose up in protest, the prison guards opened fire and killed eight more prisoners. However, faced with the prisoners' determined resistance, the French prison authorities were forced to concede and abandon the plan to force the prisoners to build the road.

After his death, his remains were temporarily buried at Kon Tum prison. In 1938, his comrade Đỗ Minh Châu, after completing his prison sentence, traveled to Kon Tum with his family to exhume the grave and found a bullet still lodged in his remains. His family subsequently brought his remains back and reburied him on their ancestral land, in what is now Trương Quang Trọng ward, Quảng Ngãi province.

== Personal life ==
According to researchers, he was married once, but his wife died at an early age while pregnant with their first child. Later, during his revolutionary activities, he met Nguyễn Thị Du, a former schoolmate from his time studying in Huế. The two quietly fell in love but did not dare reveal their relationship, as he feared that she would become implicated if his activities were exposed and he was arrested.

While he was imprisoned in Quảng Ngãi and Quy Nhơn, Du came to visit him and embroidered a cotton undershirt for him. During conversations with fellow prisoners, he often said: "This shirt may only end up covering my remains, for I may never see my beloved again!" Indeed, he was wearing the shirt when he was shot dead.

When she learned of his death, Du went to Kon Tum prison to pay her respects at his grave and wrote a poem expressing her emotions. However, her whereabouts in later years are unknown.

== Commemoration ==
His name was given to streets in the former cities of Quảng Ngãi and Kon Tum. His hometown, Sơn Tịnh district, was also briefly known as phủ Trương Quang Trọng following the August Revolution in 1945.

In 2013, when Quảng Ngãi expanded its administrative boundaries by incorporating Sơn Tịnh commune-level town (township) and nine eastern communes of Sơn Tịnh District into the city, Sơn Tịnh township was converted into Trương Quang Trọng ward under the city. Since 2025, the ward has been administered directly by Quảng Ngãi province, as it is today.
