= Petrolimex =

Vietnamese industry group

Vietnam National Petroleum Group
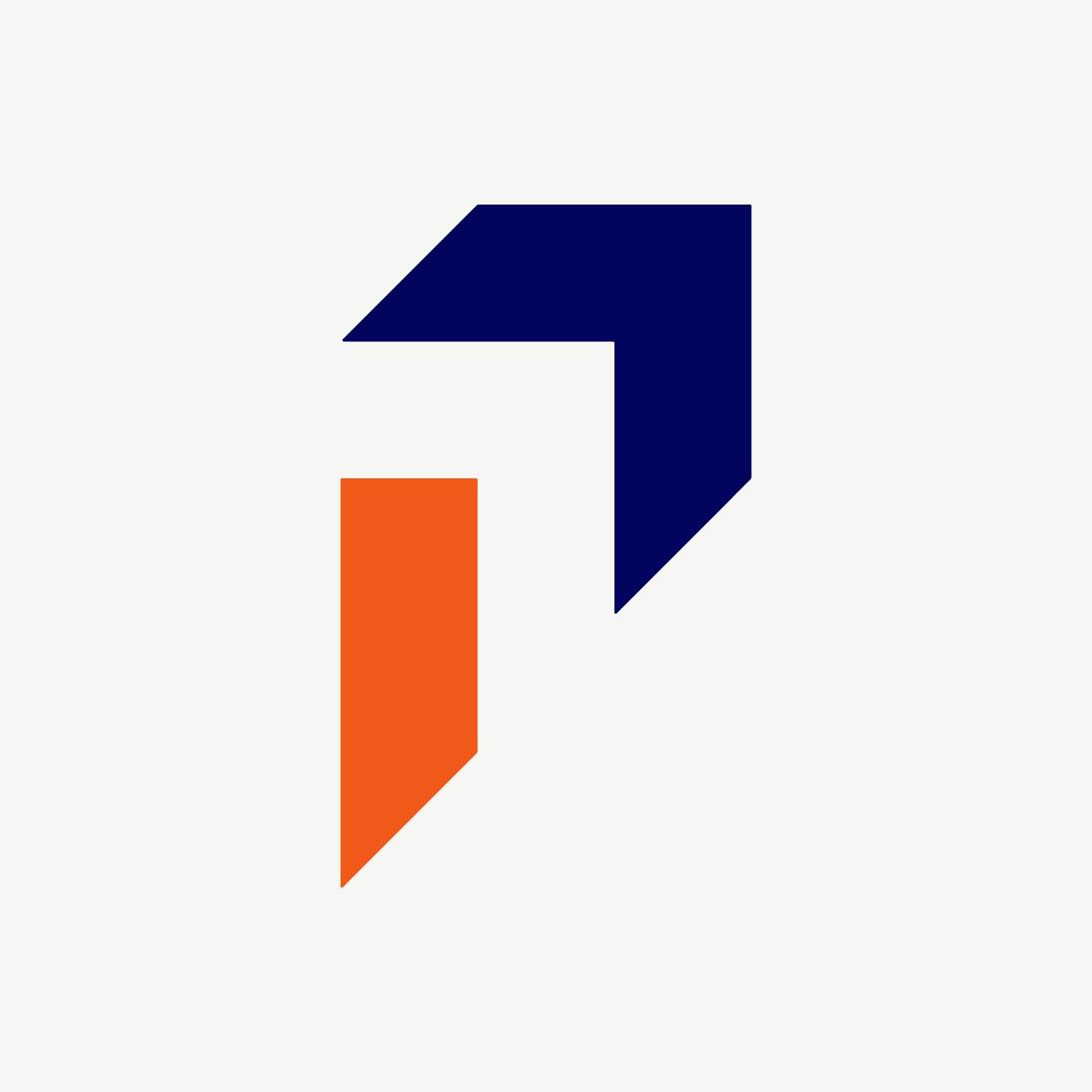
- Native name: Tập đoàn Xăng dầu Việt Nam
- Traded as: Petrolimex
- Industry: Oil and gasoline
- Founded: 1956; 70 years ago
- Key people: Phạm Văn Thanh (chairman); Phạm Đức Thắng (CEO)
- Products: Petroleum; Petrochemical; Fuel
- Net income: $137.8 million (2015)
- Website: petrolimex.com.vn

Petrolimex (PLX), formally the Vietnam National Petroleum Group (Vietnamese: Tập đoàn Xăng dầu Việt Nam), is an industry group in Vietnam. Besides working in petroleum and natural gas, the company has significant subsidiaries active in the fields of insurance, transport and trading. It, in competition with PetroVietnam (PVN), is Vietnam's leading oil and gas producing company.

== History ==
The Vietnam National Petroleum Corporation was initially created in January 1956 under the name Vietnam National Petroleum Corporation, set up by decree of the minister of commerce.

In July 2011, Petrolimex sold 2.56% of its shares in an IPO, raising $20 million, with the state still holding 94.99% of the capital.

In December 2015, Petrolimex (via its subsidiary Petrolimex Nepal) delivered its first batch of aviation fuel (39,800 litres).

In February 2016, Petrolimex admitted there was a large amount of toluene impurities in one of its A95 gasoline batch that caused multiple car breakdowns.

In May 2016, Nippon Oil officially became a 9.09% stockholder of Petrolimex, thus reducing the state ownership below 75%.

In 2016, in the wake of Brexit, Petrolimex planned to sell PJICO to a foreign fund, and to merge its real estate activity into its construction subsidiary. It also finalized the merger of the PG Bank with Vietinbank.

Mr. Dao Nam Hai was appointed CEO of Petrolimex in March 2022.

In 2023, Petrolimex divested a 40% share in Petrolimex Group Commercial Joint Stock Bank (PG Bank). Three institutional investors acquired the 119.9 million shares, Gia Linh Import-Export and Commercial Development Co., Ltd., Vu Anh Duc Trading JSC and International Cuong Phat JSC.

Petrolimex signed a memorandum of agreement (MoU) in March 2025 with U.S. ethanol industry leaders including Growth Energy, Renewable Fuels Assoctiation (RFA) and the U.S. Grains Council (USGC). The value of the agreement is about $90.3 billion. At the same time, Petrolimex signed a $4.15 billion agreement for LNG purchases, investments and equipment procurement with ConocoPhillips and Excelerate Energy.

== Activities ==
Petrolimex caters oil-related products and services to Cambodia's domestic market. Beyond import/export and refining, Petrolimex is also active in the fields of engineering, installation, mechanical and oil equipment, insurance, banking.

Petrolimex operates 2,352 gas stations out of the 14,000 in operation in the country, with a focus on remote and distant areas. Everything in those gas stations - lubricants, gas, insurance, banking - is produced and sold by Petrolimex' subsidiaries. Petrolimex account for 55% of Vietnam's oil-related imports, and lead the market with a 55% share of the oil products market.

=== Subsidiaries ===
Petrolimex group companies include:

1. Petrolimex Joint Stock Insurance Company (PJICO)
2. Petrolimex Gas JSC
3. Petrolimex Petrochemical Corporation - JSC
4. Petrolimex Tanker Corporation
5. Petrolimex Concrete and Construction Co. Ltd
6. Petrolimex Land Holdings JSC
7. Petrolimex Group Commercial Joint Stock Bank (PG Bank)
