= Vinare =

Vietnam National Reinsurance Corporation
- Trade name: Vinare
- Type: Public
- Industry: Reinsurance
- Founded: 1995; 31 years ago
- Headquarters: Hanoi, Vietnam

Vietnam National Reinsurance Corporation (Vinare), established in 1995, is Vietnam's reinsurance company. Its offices are located in Hanoi.

In 2006, Vinare became the first financial firm admitted to the official public listing in the country. It was the 10th firm to trade on the Hanoi Securities Trading Center; its symbol is VNR.
