= Le Khiet High School for the Gifted, Quang Ngai =

Coordinates: 15.1161°N 108.7924°E

Lê Khiết High School for the Gifted
- Trường THPT Chuyên Lê Khiết
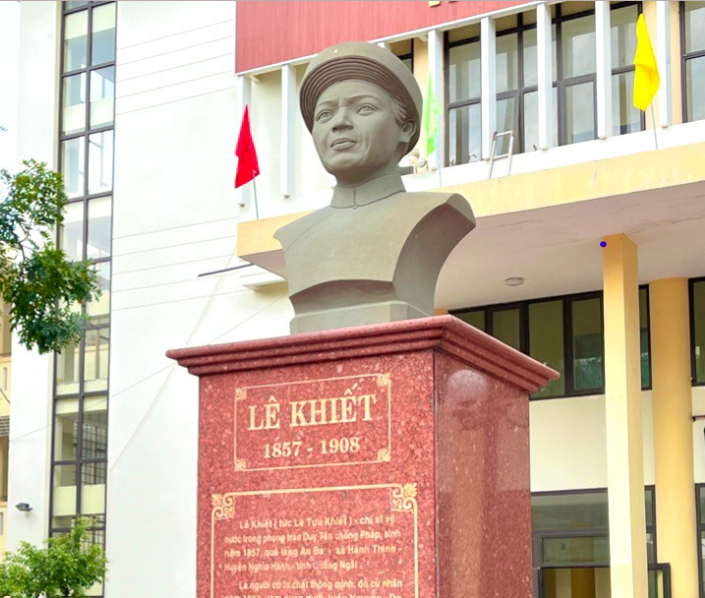

Location
- 112 Chu Văn An; Quảng Ngãi; Vietnam

Information
- Type: Public, Magnet
- Established: 1 October 1945; 80 years ago
- Principal: Vũ Thị Liên Hương
- Faculty: 104
- Grades: 10, 11, 12
- Gender: Co-educational
- Enrolment: 1161
- Language: Vietnamese
- Campus type: Urban
- School fees: No tuition fee
- Website: c3chuyenlekhiet.quangngai.edu.vn (Vietnamese)

Lê Khiết High School for the Gifted (Vietnamese: Trung học Phổ thông Chuyên Lê Khiết) is a highly selective public magnet high school in Quảng Ngải province, Vietnam. Founded in 1945, the school became a part of the nationwide public magnet school systems in 1993.

Among Central Vietnam's most prestigious high schools, Lê Khiết is the only gifted high school in Quảng Ngải province, attracting top students from the province and nearby area. Its students have won awards at national and regional academic olympiads, while its alumni have included notable figures in local and national politics, academia and business, including former President of Vietnam Trần Đức Lương, founding chancellor of Danang University Phan Kỳ Phùng and agent orange activist Phan Thị Phi Phi.

== History ==
Lê Khiết High School was established on October 1, 1945, under the direction of well-known revolutionary author Nguyn V. During its first 10 years of operation, the school has trained 3,419 students. On April 30, 1955, the school was dissolved following the Geneva Agreement.

In 1989, Quảng Ngãi province was re-established on the basis of separation from Nghĩa Bình province. The school was re-established on September 5, 1990.

In July 1993, the school merged with the "2-3 Specialized School" to form the current Lê Khiết High School for the Gifted, which then became a part of the nationwide public magnet school systems.

The school currently offers advanced courses in the Social Sciences, Humanities and Natural Sciences. As a public magnet school, it does not charge tuition fee but instead provide grants to subsidize the cost of living for underprivileged students, in addition to scholarship for excellent students.

Its principal is Vũ Thị Liên Hương, a member of the National Assembly of Vietnam.

== Honors & Awards ==
Since its re-establishment, the school has been awarded the First and Second-class Labor Orders and the Third-class Independence Medal.

In 2011, the Vietnam Union of Science and Technology Associations, the National Youth Union, and the Ministry of Education and Training recognized Lê Khiết as an excellent unit and a "golden symbol of talent training" for the first time.

Since its re-establishment in 1990, Lê Khiết High School for the Gifted has trained more than 8,000 graduates. Its students have won accolades at national and regional academic olympiads. The school has a graduation rate is 100%, with 95% of graduates gaining admission to institutions of higher education.
