= An Giang Coffee =

Vietnamese coffee company

An Giang Coffee (CTCP Cà Phê An Giang) (HST:AGC) is a coffee company in Vietnam. An Giang primarily manufactures and trades coffee, although it has other manufacturing activities and operates a logistics network (i.e. warehousing and trucking). It produces about 60,000 tons of coffee per year, which is approximately 10% of Vietnam's total coffee production. An Giang exports coffee to over 20 countries, including Japan, Switzerland and Belgium; and it manages its own brand name of coffee, "An Giang Coffee".

The company headquarter is located in Long Thành District of Đồng Nai Province, which is in the south of Vietnam adjacent to Ho Chi Minh City. It is listed on the Hanoi Securities Trading Center.

== See also ==
- Coffee cultivation and production
