= Hai Au Paper =

Vietnamese paper company

Hai Au Paper JSC (CTCP Giấy Hải Âu; HASTC:GHA) is a paper company in Vietnam. It is a subsidiary company of HAPACO (Hanoi Paper Company) and is listed on the Hanoi Securities Trading Center. Hai Au is active in the paper sector, producing packaging material and forestry supplies, and trading paper goods and goods involved in the paper industry. It is located in Hai Phong.

== See also ==
- Paper mill
- Papermaking
