= Bao Viet Holdings =

- Traded as: HOSE: BVH
- Industry: Insurance
- Founded: 1964
- Headquarters: Hanoi, Vietnam
- Key people: Lê Quang Bình (chairman); Nguyễn Thị Phúc Lâm (director)
- Revenue: 14,872 bn VND (2011)
- Operating income: 1,521 bn VND (2011)
- Total assets: 43,581 bn VND (2011)
- Owner: Ministry of Finance (Vietnam)
- Website: http://www.baoviet.com.vn/Home

Bao Viet (also Bao Viet Holdings Vietnamese: Tập đoàn Tài chính-Bảo hiểm Bảo Việt) is the largest Vietnamese insurance company and Vietnam's seventh largest listed company by market capitalisation. It is state-owned and has a strategic partnership with HSBC, which also holds 18% of Bao Viet's shares. HSBC is, however, soon to be replaced by Sumitomo Life. Besides various insurance products, Bao Viet has diversified into stock market trading, fond management and real estate. It also has subsidiaries in banking, hotels and construction. Bao Viet has been losing market shares in years and has also been making losses in the insurance sector since 2009.

== History ==
Bao Viet was set up following Government Decision 179/CP from 17 Dec 1964. It started operating on 15 Jan 1965, providing traditional insurance products in two branches in Hanoi and Haiphong with a total staff of 20 people and a capital stock of 10 million VND. It was transformed into a corporation (Tổng Công ty) in 1989. Subsidiary BAVINA was set up in England in 1992. By 1996, it was among the 25 largest state companies in Vietnam and was ranked as a special class state company. The government decided to turn Bao Viet into a major finance and insurance group in 2003, enabling it to offer a broad range of financial products other than insurance – a decision that was not implemented until 2007. In 2007 the company established partnerships with national groups such as Vinashin and international companies, namely HSBC. HSBC acquired a stake of 10% and options for another 15% in 2007 and bought another 8% in 2009. From 2007 to 2008 Bao Viet was also restructured, including registration as a joint-stock company and the setting up of several wholly owned subsidiaries in the insurance sector. Bao Viet stocks have been traded in Ho Chi Minh city Stock Exchange since 2009.

== Market shares and competitors ==
Bao Viet had a share of 23.7% in the insurance market (excluding life insurance) in 2011. This has been gradually decreasing from 38.4% in 2005. Bao Viet is still the market leader, but PetroVietnam Insurance is very close behind. Smaller competitors with just over 10% market share include Bao Minh and PJICO. In general, the insurance market has become more competitive, with companies other than the big four doubling their combined market share to over 30% between 2005 and 2011.

In the Vietnamese life insurance market Bao Viet is the second largest provider after Prudential with a market share of 28% in 2011, down from 38% in 2005. Other competitors include Manulife, Dai-ichi Life, and Ace Life, with market shares of up to around 10% each. According to the Ministry of Finance, Bao Viet was the largest life insurer in 2012 with market share of 23.9%, slightly ahead of Prudential with 22.6%.

== Ownership ==
Bao Viet is a state-owned company. The Ministry of Finance holds 71% of the shares and the State Capital Investment Corporation (SCIC) another 3%. HSBC currently owns 18% of the shares, all of which are soon going to be transferred to Sumitomo Life.

== Companies and products ==
Bao Viet Insurance Ltd. (100% owned by BVH) is the company originally set up under the name Bao Viet in 1965. It offers a variety of insurance products to personal customers (health, travel, motor vehicle, accident insurance) and corporate customers (cargo, aviation, oil and gas, motor vehicle, liability insurance etc.).

HDBank iCare is a health insurance system offered by HDBank in cooperation with Bao Viet Insurance.

Bao Viet Life (100%) was separated from Bao Viet Insurance in 2004. Bao Viet has been offering life insurances since 1996. 2012 revenues were 7,090bn VND ($340m) and profits 688bn ($33m). According to the Ministry of Finance, it is the leading life insurer in Vietnam with a market share of 23.9% in 2012.

Bao Viet Fund (BVF) (100%) is the successor of the group's Investment Center. It was set up with a legal capital of 50 billion VND and is active in portfolio management and portfolio management consulting.

Bao Viet Securities (BVS) (60% owned by BVH) is the group's second company to be listed on a stock exchange. While Bao Viet Holdings is listed in Ho Chi Minh City, BVS is listed in the younger and smaller Hanoi Securities Trading Center. It offers securities brokerage services. The company's chairman Nguyen Thi Phuc Lam is also director of Bao Viet Holdings.

Bao Viet Bank (52% owned by BVH) was set up in December 2009 in cooperation with Vinamilk, CMC Technology Corporation and HiPT Technology Corporation. This was an expression of Bao Viet's new business model based on the three pillars of insurance, securities and banking. Besides basic banking services, the bank is also involved in insurance sales and wealth management advise.

Bao Viet Investment (55% owned by BVH) was set up in January 2009 and specialised in construction investment. Activities include real estate investment, consulting and trading.

== Financial Information ==
	Revenues (bn VND)	Profit before tax (vn VND)	Net profit (bn VND)
2011	14,872	1521	1202
2010	12,896	5876	5602
2009	10,560	1250	1011
