= Bien Hoa Sugar =

Bien Hoa Sugar Joint Stock Company (VN:BHS) is a sugar company located in Biên Hòa of Đồng Nai Province in Vietnam. The company was founded as the "400 Tons Sugar Factory" in 1969 and received its current name in 1994. The company was equitized in 2001 as a joint stock company. Bien Hoa operates a cane sugar mill and produces raw sugar, refined sugar, liqueurs and wine, ramen noodles and microorganism fertilizer.

== See also ==
- Sugarcane
- Molasses
- List of companies in Vietnam
