= Long Thành district =

District in Đồng Nai province, Vietnam

Coordinates: 10.833°N 107.000°E

Long Thành district Huyện Long Thành
- District
- Huyện Long Thành
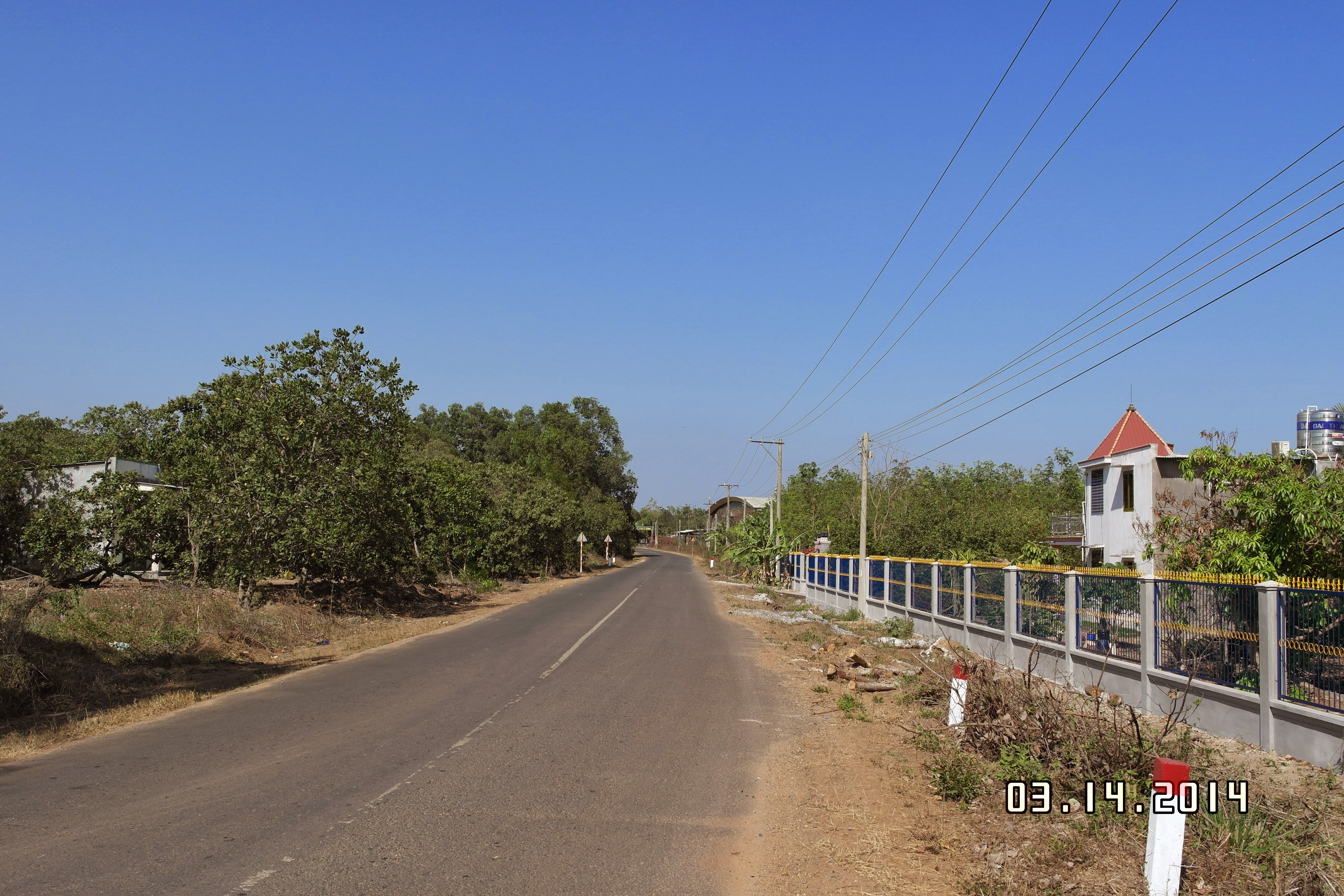
- Phước Bình road

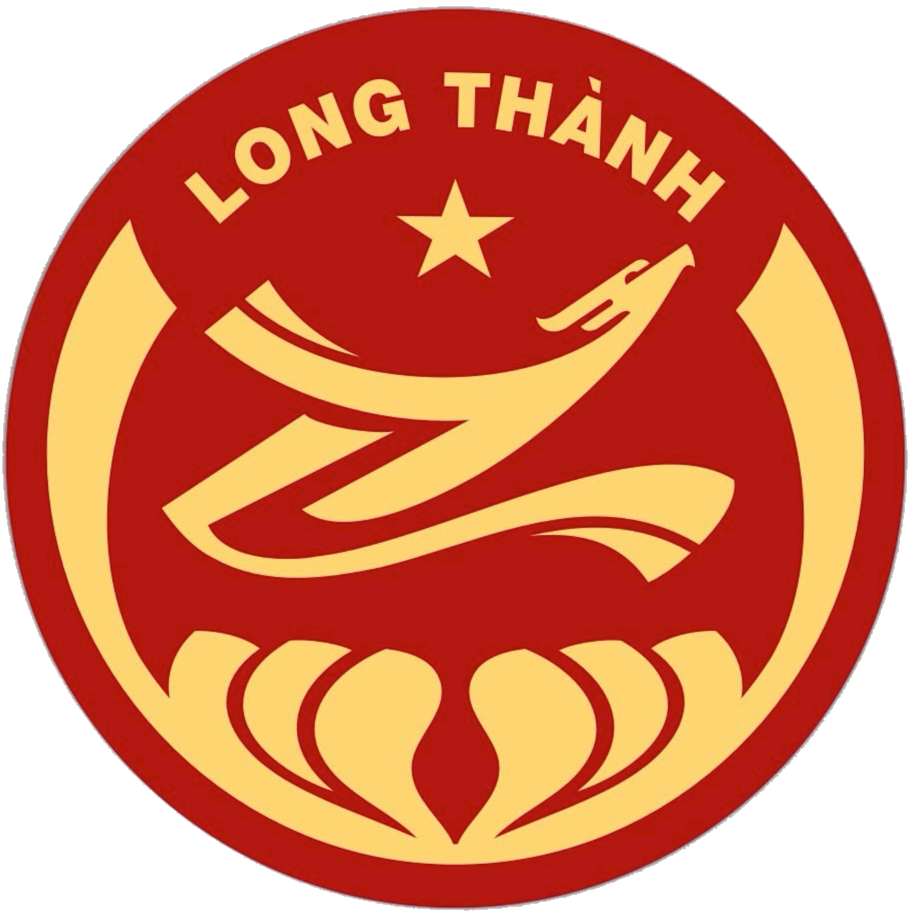
- Seal
- Interactive map of Long Thành district
- Country: Vietnam
- Region: Southeast
- Province: Đồng Nai
- Capital: Long Thành

Area
  - Total: 207 sq mi (535 km^{2})

Population (2019)
  - Total: 246,051 (Arp. 2,019)
- Time zone: UTC+7 (Indochina Time)

Long Thành is a former rural district of Đồng Nai province in the Southeast region of Vietnam. As of 2003, the district had a population of 204,793. The district covers an area of 535 km^{2}. The district capital lies at Long Thành. It is home to Long Thanh International Airport, the future airport serving Ho Chi Minh City.

== Economy ==
Companies based in the district include An Giang Coffee Ltd. (CTCP Cà Phê An Giang). The Long Đức Industrial Park is located in the Long Thành District.
