= Vinavico Group =

Vietnam engineering company

Vinavico Group (Underground Works Construction Joint Stock Company) is an industrial conglomerate of Vietnam. The company was founded in 2003 and its main offices are located in Hanoi. Vinavico's main work is in construction, viz buildings, industrial, transport infrastructure, irrigation and hydropower projects, specializing in underground construction work. Company stock is listed at the Hanoi Securities Trading Center, the symbol is CTN.

== History ==
Vinavico Group was founded in May 2003 as "Underground Works Construction JSC - Vinavico". Since that time the company has expanded; branches include: the Highland Branch and offices in Lào Cai Province, Nghệ An Province and Ho Chi Minh City. Underground Works Construction Joint Stock Company (VINAVICO) is a heavy civil construction contractor in Vietnam.

The Company focuses on infrastructure projects, such as the construction of hydropower facilities, dams, tunnels, roads, mines and urban buildings. The Company is also making investments in hydropower and urban developments in Vietnam. The Company operates in Vietnam through its direct and indirect subsidiaries. It serves public sector clients. Its wholly owned subsidiary, Cavico Vietnam, conducts its operations through a number of subsidiaries.

== Subsidiaries ==
Subsidiaries comprising Vinavico Group include:

- Vinavico IDI
- Vinavico CNC
- Vinavico Infortech
- Vinavico Media
- Vinavico Incom
- Vinavico New Materials
