= Long Đức Industrial Park =

Industrial park in Vietnam

The Long Đức Industrial Park (Vietnamese: Khu công nghiệp Long Đức, KCN Long Đức / 區工業隆德) is an industrial park located in Long Thành District, Đồng Nai Province, Vietnam.

It has a factory area of 200 ha within a 270 ha park. Access to major transport hubs:

- 42 km from Ho Chi Minh City
- 40 km from Cai Mep Thi Vai port
- 40 km from Cat Lai port
- 45 km from Tan Son Nhat International Airport
- 14 km from Long Thanh New International Airport (scheduled to open in 2020)
