= Hanoimilk =

Vietnamese food company

Hanoimilk JSC (HASTC:HNM) is a food company in Vietnam, producing mainly milk and dairy products, as well as working in animal husbandry and agriculture. It is located in Vĩnh Phúc in the Red River Delta in north Vietnam, and is listed on the Hanoi Securities Trading Center.

== See also ==
- Dairy cattle
- Dairy farming
- Milk
