= Sumitomo Life =

Japanese life insurance company

Sumitomo Life Insurance Company 住友生命保険相互会社

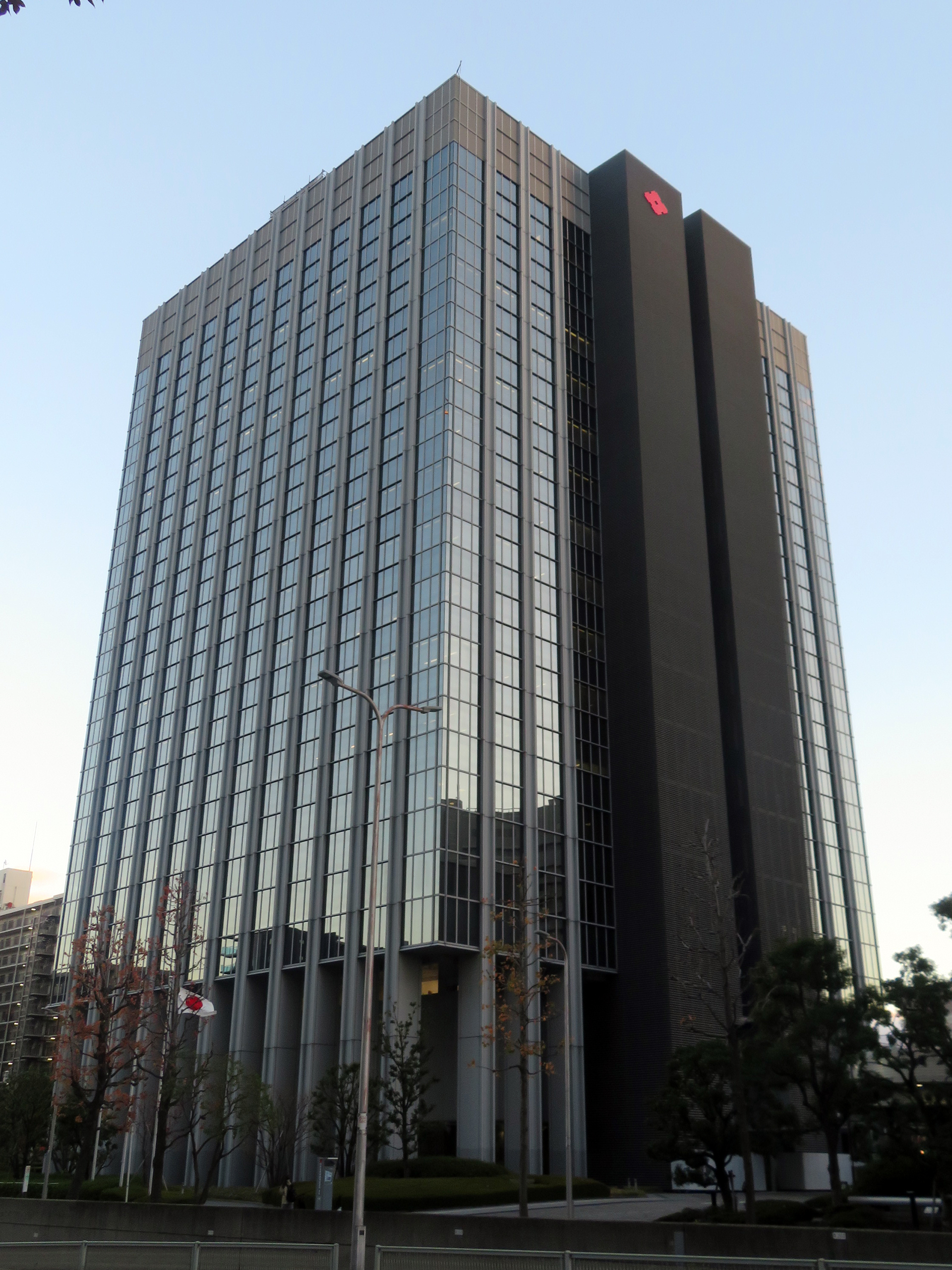
- Headquarters in Chuo-ku, Osaka
- Romanized name: Sumitomo Seimei Hoken Sōgo-gaisha
- Type: Private. Mutual
- Industry: Insurance
- Founded: 1907
- Headquarters: 4-35, Shiromi Itchome, Chuo-ku, Osaka, Osaka Prefecture, Japan
- Key people: Masahiro Hashimoto (Chairman); Yukinori Takada (President)
- Number of employees: 42,098
- Website: sumitomolife.co.jp

Sumitomo Life Insurance Company (住友生命保険相互会社, Sumitomo Seimei Hoken Sōgo-gaisha; Sumisei) is a mutual life insurance company in Japan, founded in 1907 and headquartered in Osaka.

In 2005, the company announced a joint venture with the People's Insurance Company of China. The new company was named PICC Life Insurance, which sells insurance products, including savings-oriented endowment insurance policies.

In 2012, Sumitomo Life decided to become a strategic partner of Bao Viet Insurance from Vietnam by acquiring 18% of the company's shares previously held by HSBC.

== See also ==
- List of investors in Bernard L. Madoff Securities
