= Sendo.vn =

Vietnamese e-commerce retailer and online commerce platform

- Company type: Subsidiary of FPT Corporation
- Industry: E-commerce
- Founded: 2012; Vietnam
- Headquarters: Ho Chi Minh City, Vietnam
- Area served: Vietnam
- Parent: FPT Corporation
- Website: sendo.vn

Sen Do Joint Stock Company is a Vietnamese e-commerce retailer and online commerce platform. It is a subsidiary of Vietnamese software conglomerate FPT Corporation.

== Notable acquisitions ==
On 7 July 2014, Sendo acquired its rival, a Vietnamese e-commerce pioneer 123 Mua from consumer technology company VNG Corporation for VND10 billion ($US 469,500). 123 Mua's customer base reportedly included 30 million online shoppers. 34 million out of Vietnam's 90-million population use the Internet. As of May 2015, 123 Mua (translated from Vietnamese as "123 buy") continues to operate as a separate website at 123mua.vn. In 2017, all traffic to 123mua.vn's domain was redirected to Sendo.vn.

In February 2020, the news raised up on a potential merger between Sendo and another rival, a Vietnamese B2C e-commerce Tiki.vn Both companies rejected commenting on this matter.
