= Sơn Tịnh =

- Commune
- Phước Lộc Bridge over the Trà Khúc River, connecting Sơn Tịnh and Nghĩa Giang communes

- Location in Vietnam
- Coordinates: 15.155099279985508°N 108.74071065525648°E
- Country: Vietnam
- Region: South Central Coast and Central Highlands
- Province: Quảng Ngãi
- Established: 16 June 2025

Area
  - Total: 59.78 km^{2} (23.08 sq mi)

Population (31 December 2024)
  - Total: 42,380
  - Density: 708/km^{2} (1,830/sq mi)

Sơn Tịnh is a commune in Quảng Ngãi province, Vietnam.

On 16 June 2025, the Standing Committee of the National Assembly of Vietnam issued Resolution No. 1677/NQ-UBTVQH15 on the arrangement of commune-level administrative units in Quảng Ngãi province in 2025. Under the resolution, the entire area and population of Tịnh Hà township, Tịnh Bình, and Tịnh Sơn communes, formerly part of Sơn Tịnh district, were merged to form a new commune named Sơn Tịnh.
