= Appota Corporation =

Vietnamese digital company

- Company type: Corporation
- Industry: Entertainment; Game publishing Advertisement; Digital payment
- Founded: 2011
- Headquarters: Building 11 (LE Building), Alley 71, Lang Ha St., Ba Dinh Dist., Hanoi, Vietnam
- Products: Gamota; AppotaX; Appota e-Wallet; AppotaPay; Gamehub; LNY; Appota Card; Appota Reports; WiFi Chua; Appota Esports
- Number of employees: 450
- Website: appota.com

Appota Corporation is a Vietnamese developer and provider of digital products. Appota's core business includes digital content production and distribution, esports, advertising, game creation, online payment, cloud computing, IoT, and business management.

Four subsidiary companies fall under the Appota group: Gamota (video game publishing), Adsota (digital marketing), AppotaPay (digital payment and fintech), and Kdata (cloud infrastructure solutions).

== History ==
Appota Corporation was founded in 2011. In January 2013, the company received the Best in Asia title at the Founder Institute Graduate Awards.

In 2017, the group's digital marketing branch, Adsota, became Facebook's first gaming agency in Vietnam.

In 2018, the company purchased WiFi Chua, a local Wi-Fi password-sharing application.

In 2019, Appota launched the AppotaLock AS-1 and AppotaLock AN-1 smart locks, thus entering the sphere of smart home applications.

In 2021, the company received the Sao Khue Award in the field of digital transformation for their human resource management product ACheckin.

In 2023, the company won the Inspiration Brand Award at the Asia Pacific Enterprise Awards In 2024, they received the Outstanding Publisher Award at the Vietnam Game Awards. and the Outstanding Art Products and Services Solutions at the Vietnam Digital Awards.
