= Savimex =

Vietnamese furniture manufacturer and construction company

Savimex Corp (SAV:VN) is a wooden furniture manufacturer and home construction company based in Ho Chi Minh City, Vietnam. The company processes timber, makes furniture, manages brand names and exports furniture to Japan, the EU and the United States. It buys, imports and works woods such as eucalyptus, rubber, oak and beech. Its furniture products include tables, chairs, shelving units, beds, dining room sets, bedroom sets and more.

Business units and brand names of Savimex Group include:

- SaviWoodtech – furniture making facility in Thu Duc District, Ho Chi Minh
- SaviDecor – furniture and interior decoration including clients such as hotels, apartment complexes, office buildings
- SaviHomes – build homes and apartment buildings, manage real estate
- Satimex – furniture for export and deal in woodworking supplies like abrasive cloth and paint
- SaviPack - manufacturing and trading paper packaging
- Moho - B2C online based home living brand
