= VietinBank =

Vietnamese bank

Vietnam Joint Stock Commercial Bank for Industry and Trade
- Trade name: VietinBank
- Type: Joint-stock company
- Traded as: HOSE: CTG
- Industry: Financial services
- Founded: 1988
- Headquarters: Hanoi
- Area served: Vietnam
- Key people: Lê Đức Thọ (chairman); Trần Minh Bình (director)
- Revenue: 55.775 bn VND (2011)
- Operating income: 8,392 bn VND (2011)
- Net income: 6,259 bn VND (2011)
- Owner: State Bank of Vietnam
- Website: www.vietinbank.vn

Vietnam Joint Stock Commercial Bank for Industry and Trade (Vietnamese: Ngân hàng Thương mại Cổ phần Công thương Việt Nam), trading as VietinBank, is a state-owned Vietnamese bank. As of 2023, it is Vietnam's second-largest bank, with VND 1,800 trillion (around $76 billion) of assets under management.

According to the VNR500 (Top 500) ranking, VietinBank is Vietnam's 13th largest company. It has a market capitalisation of VND 53.22 trillion (around $2.5 billion) as of late 2012, making it one of Vietnam's largest listed companies.

Major customers with loans of several hundreds of millions of dollars include PetroVietnam and Vietnam Electricity (EVN). VietinBank also has strategic partnerships with the International Finance Corporation and Mitsubishi UFJ Financial Group.

== History ==
The Vietnam Industrial and Commercial Bank (Incombank) was set up by the State Bank of Vietnam in 1991 as one of the first four commercial banks after the introduction of a two-tier banking system. Other sources suggest that the bank was set up in 1988. By 2000 the bank had total assets of 48.7 trillion VND, deposits of 40.7 trillion and debts of 26.2 trillion. Loans were granted mostly to large government programmes in priority sectors such as postal services, communication, processing, and construction material, but there was also lending for non-commercial purposes such as flood relief and training funds for poor students.

As other major commercial state banks, VietinBank was pressured by the government to continue lending to unprofitable state companies. It was subject to a 1 trillion VND recapitalisation by the government in December 2002, effectively doubling the bank's charter capital (from 1.045 trillion in 2001). It was the only of the four major state banks not part of the second stage of recapitalisation in 2003.

Incombank changed its name to VietinBank in April 2008. It was listed on the Ho Chi Minh City Stock Exchange in July 2009.

VietinBank had two major increases in its chartered capital in 2011 by issuing more shares to existing shareholders, thereby increasing chartered capital to 20.23 trillion VND by the end of the year (around $1 billion). At this point, state shareholders held 80.3% of the bank's shares.

== Ownership ==
Vietinbank is majority owned by the State Bank of Vietnam. It holds 64% of the bank's shares after selling 20% to CK Hutchison Holdings according to Bloomberg and 67.4% according to estimates published by Gafin.vn. CKH is projected to hold 20%/ 16.1% and the State Capital Investment Corporation 10%/ 8.4%.

== Strategic partnerships ==
The State Capital Investment Corporation became Vietinbank's first strategic partner in October 2010, when it signed a cooperation agreement with the bank and acquired 10% of its shares.

Vietinbank announced its second strategic partnership with CK Hutchison Holdings in December 2012. CKH is going to buy 20% of Vietinbank's shares for 15.5 trillion dong ($743 million). CKH wants to gain a foothold in Vietnam's growing markets for retail lending and international banking transactions, while Vietinbank hopes to improve corporate governance and risk management.

== Alleged frauds ==
Huynh Thi Huyen Nhu, a former Acting Head of the Dien Bien Phu Transaction Office of VietinBank, was indicted of stealing 4 trillion VND (equivalent of 230 million dollars) from 3 major banks, 9 companies and 3 individuals. This was considered the biggest bank fraud in 2014.

During the trial, some lawyers believed that VietinBank, where Nhu worked for and used its credentials to the scheme, must take responsibility for the swindling case and compensate the victims in the case. However, VietinBank has denied its responsibility in the case, stating that the institutions and individuals were cheated when dealing with Nhu personally, not VietinBank. Meanwhile, the bank’s computing system was only the instrument for Nhu to implement her cheating. The amount expected to be lost from this case was roughly 3200 billion VND (equivalent of 150 million dollars).

== Subsidiaries ==
=== Independent accounting subsidiaries ===
- VietinBank Securities Co Ltd (76% owned by VietinBank) is listed in Hanoi Securities Trading Center (CTS) and has a market capitalisation of 551.7 billion VND.
- VietinBank Leasing (100% owned by VietinBank)
- VietinBank Insurance (100% owned by VietinBank)
- VietinBank Aviva Life Insurance (50% owned by VietinBank)
- VietinBank Asset Management Company (100% owned by VietinBank)
- VietinBank Fund Management Company (100% owned by VietinBank)
- VietinBank Gold and Jewellery Company (100% owned by VietinBank)
- VietinBank Global Money Transfer Company (100% owned by VietinBank)

=== Non-profit making units ===
- VietinBank Information Technology Center (100% owned by VietinBank)
- VietinBank Card Center (100% owned by VietinBank)
- VietinBank Training Center (100% owned by VietinBank)

=== Being the founder of the following Financial Credit Institutions ===
- Saigon Bank for Commerce and Industry
- Indovina Bank (the first joint-venture bank in Vietnam) (50% owned by VietinBank)
- Vietnam International Leasing Company – VILC (the first financial leasing company in Vietnam)

== Awards ==
- Vietnam National Brand Award
- Sao Khue Award 2023
- Best SME Bank in Vietnam
- Best Retail Bank in Vietnam
- Excellence in Innovation - Contact Center Vietnam 2023
- Grand Prix - Vạn Xuân Awards 2023
