= Southern Seed =

Southern Seed Joint Stock Company (HCM:SSC) is a hybrid seed company based in Vietnam. SSC researches, produces and trades rice, corn and vegetable seeds. Secondary activities include the production and trade of agricultural products and animal husbandry supplies, seed processing machinery and agricultural chemicals. The company has main offices in Ho Chi Minh City, a branch in Hanoi and a branch office in Phnom Penh. Southern Seed operates six manufacturing facilities and employs over 300 people. It is listed at the Ho Chi Minh Securities Trading Center.

== See also ==
- Hybrid plants
- Economic importance of seeds
