= Đại Cát Tường =

Đại Cát Tường is a textile manufacturer in Quảng Ngãi Province, Vietnam. After several years of making losses, it was acquired by Vinatex as part of the latter's strategy of decentralization of its production for 39.876bn VND.

The company has a factory in Tịnh Phong Industrial Park (khu công nghiệp Tịnh Phong) in Sơn Tịnh District of Quảng Ngãi Province.

Vinatex has announced it will invest around 50 billion VND to renovate the factory, buy machines, build dormitories for the workers, and increase employment to 3000.

== History ==
Đại Cát Tường was founded in March 2005 with capital 38 billion VND, mostly borrowed with a preferential interest rate from the province's policy bank. It used to employ 1300 workers before it started to make losses. Strikes have occurred since 2008 because of unpaid wages. Production was suspended in 2010 and the bank tried to sell the factory.
