= Vietnam Petroleum Institute =

Organization based in Hanoi, Vietnam

Vietnam Petroleum Institute (VPI) was established on May 22, 1978. It is based in Hanoi, with a branch in Ho Chi Minh City.

The Institute's assigned functions and tasks are as follows:

- Carrying out scientific and technological studies in the fields of prospecting, exploration, production, transportation, storage distribution, economics and management of oil and gas; cooperating with local and international organizations in these fields.
- Providing scientific and technical services for companies inside and outside the petroleum industry as well as for foreign oil companies.
- Providing scientific and technological consultancy for Vietnamese Government and Petrovietnam, State agencies and foreign oil companies in the fields of prospecting, exploration, production, transportation, storage and economics of oil and gas.
- Providing training to improve professional capability of personnel working in the oil and gas industry, including post - graduate programs.
- Website: http://www.vpi.pvn.vn/vn/Home.aspx
