= SAMCO =

SAMCO Inc.
- Native name: サムコ株式会社
- Romanized name: Samuko Kabushiki Gaisha
- Type: Public company
- Traded as: Tokyo Stock Exchange (TSE), First Section: 6387 (since January 9, 2014)
- Industry: Semiconductor Process Equipment
- Founded: September 1979
- Founder: Osamu Tsuji
- Headquarters: Fushimi-ku, Kyoto, Japan
- Area served: Worldwide
- Key people: Osamu Tsuji (President & CEO)
- Products: Reactive-ion etching (RIE) systems Inductively coupled plasma (ICP) etching systems Deep reactive-ion etching (DRIE) systems Plasma-enhanced chemical vapor deposition (PECVD) systems Liquid Source Chemical Vapor Deposition (LSCVD) systems Plasma cleaning systems UV-Ozone Cleaning Systems
- Revenue: ¥4,210,000,000 (as of July 2013)
- Net income: ¥342,000,000 (as of July 2013) (July 2013)
- Total assets: ¥8,990,000,000 (as of 31 July 2013)
- Number of employees: 161 (July 31, 2013)
- Website: www.samcointl.com

SAMCO Inc.（サムコ株式会社）is a Japanese company that manufactures and sells semiconductor process equipment for the fabrication of electronic components as well as other micro and nano-scale devices. The company is headquartered in Kyoto, Japan, and its product line can be divided into three categories:

- Plasma etching systems (RIE, ICP, DRIE)
- Plasma deposition systems (PECVD and LS-CVD®)
- Surface treatment systems (plasma cleaners, UV-Ozone cleaners).

On May 30, 2001, SAMCO Inc. made its IPO on the JASDAQ stock exchange. On July 24, 2013, SAMCO Inc.’s public listing was accepted into the second section of the Tokyo Stock Exchange (Japan’s largest stock exchange by volume).

== History ==
SAMCO Inc. was established in 1979 by its President and CEO, Osamu Tsuji, in a private garage in the Fushimi ward of Kyoto city. Initially called “SAMCO International, Inc.”, the company consisted of two engineers who developed a plasma CVD system for the deposition of amorphous silicon thin films used in solar cells. The name “SAMCO” is actually an acronym for “Semiconductor and Materials Company” and was chosen by Mr. Tsuji with a vision of making a breakthrough in semiconductor and materials research. By October 2012, SAMCO sales had accumulated to 3,000 units of semiconductor process equipment. 70% of SAMCO's revenue comes from the fields of optoelectronics (high-luminance LED and laser applications) and electronic components (power device and SAW device applications). The company is now beginning to focus its sales efforts towards MEMS applications as well as GaN and SiC based power device applications.
