= Sơn Tịnh district =

Former district of Quảng Ngãi province, Vietnam

Sơn Tịnh district Huyện Sơn Tịnh
- District
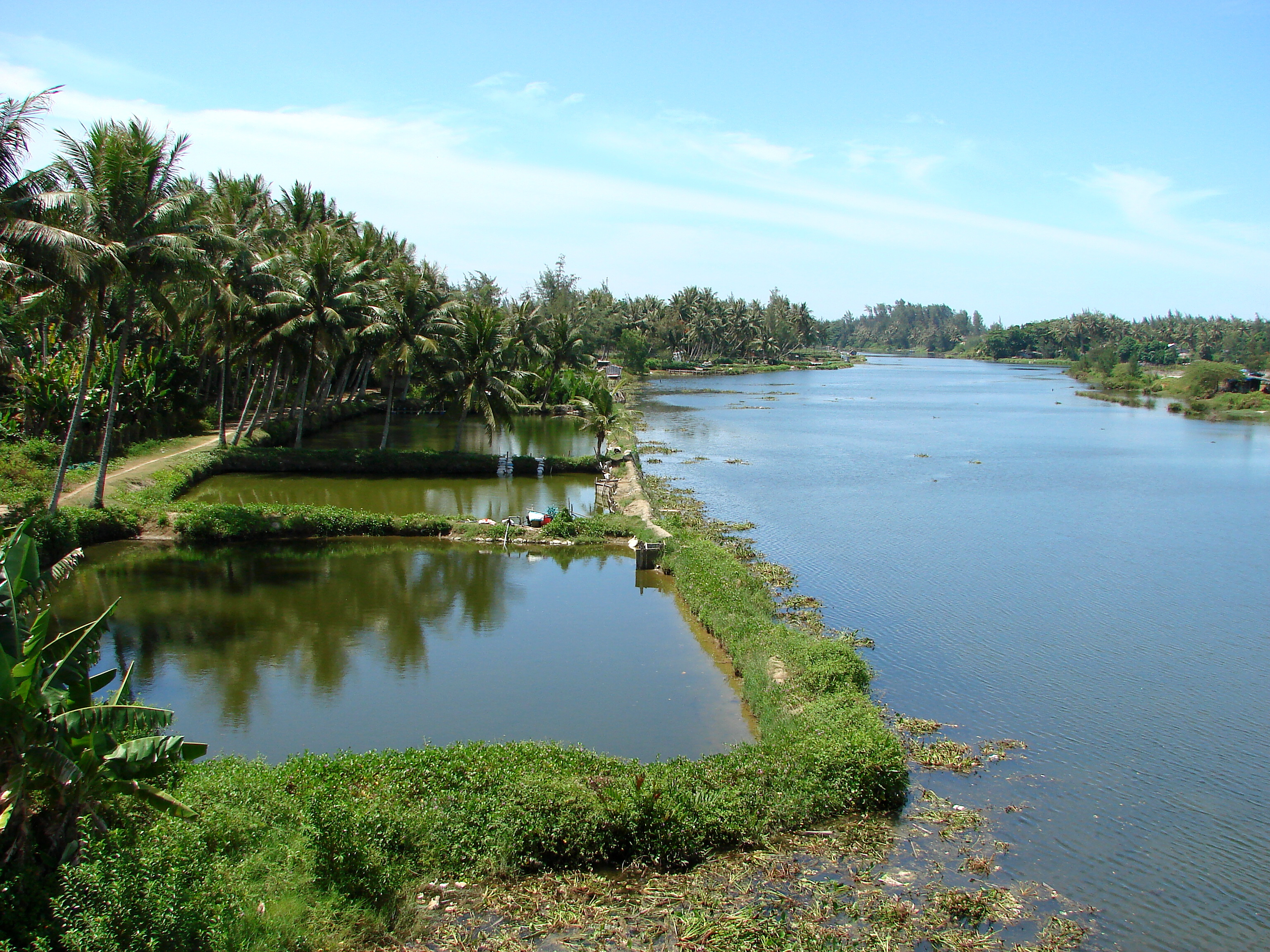
- Near the entrance to Cổ Lũy hamlet, a My Lai massacre site in 1968
- Interactive map of Sơn Tịnh district
- Country: Vietnam
- Region: South Central Coast
- Province: Quảng Ngãi
- Capital: Trương Quang Trọng

Area
  - Total: 133 sq mi (344 km^{2})

Population (2003)
  - Total: 192,841
- Time zone: UTC+7 (UTC + 7)

Sơn Tịnh is a former district of Quảng Ngãi province, in the South Central Coast region of Vietnam, situated to the northeast of the town of Quảng Ngãi. The hamlet of Mỹ Lai of the Sơn Mỹ village, Tinh Khe commune was the site of the massacre of non-combatants committed by United States Army troops in 1968, today documented in Son My Memorial Park in Son My's sub-hamlet of Tu Cung.

My Khe Beach is an attractive 8 km long beach situated in the Co Luy Village of Tinh Khe commune.

Tinh Phong Industrial Park (khu công nghiệp Tịnh Phong) is located in Son Tinh District. Dai Cat Tuong textile factory (owned by Vinatex) is located here.

== Administration ==
The district has 21 communes (xã):

- Thị trấn Sơn Tịnh
- Tịnh Long
- Tịnh An
- Tịnh Châu
- Tịnh Thiện
- Tịnh Hòa
- Tịnh Kỳ
- Tịnh Sơn
- Tịnh Hà
- Tịnh Thọ
- Tịnh Ấn Đông
- Tịnh Ấn Tây
- Tịnh Khê
- Tịnh Bình
- Tịnh Đông
- Tịnh Trà
- Tịnh Giang
- Tịnh Minh
- Tịnh Hiệp
- Tịnh Bắc

== See also ==
- My Lai massacre
