= Khaisilk =

- Founder: Mr. Hoàng Khải
- Headquarters: Ho Chi Minh City
- Website: www.khaisilkcorp.com

Khaisilk is the brand name of many fashion shops, coffee shops, restaurants, and resorts in Vietnam. Khaisilk's members mainly operate in Hà Nội, Hội An, Đà Lạt and Hồ Chí Minh City (Saigon).

A popular location is Nam Kha Restaurant, a high-end Vietnamese cuisine restaurant. It is located on Đồng Khởi Street in Hồ Chí Minh City.

== History ==
Khaisilk started out as a family embroidery shop located at 113 Hang Gai Street, Hanoi. In the late 1980s, the first Khaisilk store was founded by Hoang Khai, who was then a dropped-out 25-year-old music student. Since the beginning, Hoang Khai positioned the Khaisilk silk brand as a high-end product with a unique model, so it quickly created a reputation, especially for foreign tourists.

Located in the center of Hanoi, the first Khai Silk store quickly developed, leading to the establishments of many other silk stores on the same street. Hoang Khai also considered himself the founder of Hang Gai "silk street".

After the success of the 113 Hang Gai store, Hoang Khai continuously opened branches and product showrooms in 5-star hotels and valuable real estate locations in major cities to promote the brand, especially with the well-off customer segment. With this product positioning, the Khaisilk brand is also sought after by many domestic enterprises when they need gifts for partners.

In the early 2000s, Hoang Khai decided to move to the South of Vietnam and "encroach" on the resort and restaurant sector. In 2002, Khai Duc Company Limited was established. This is the main nucleus in the Khai Silk ecosystem in charge of the silk business and then the high-end restaurant system. According to Khai Duc's business registration, the enterprise had an adjusted capital of 46.5 billion VND, with Hoang Khai being the largest shareholder owning 99% of the capital. By 2017, Khai Duc had a system of 11 branches, of which 6 are fashion stores, including the first Khai Silk store at 113 Hang Gai, Hanoi.

Beside the expansion of the silk business with the openning of new showrooms across Dong Khoi (Ho Chi Minh City), Intercontinental Peninsula (Da Nang) and JW Marriott (Phu Quoc), Khaisilk also developed various luxury resorts, restaurants, hotels, and real estate projects, namingly:

- Au Menoir de Khai, a high-end restaurant (Dien Bien Phu Street, Ho Chi Minh City)
- Hoi An Riverside resort
- TajmaSago, a US$15 million villa inspired by India's Taj Mahal temple (Phu My Hung, Ho Chi Minh City)
- Saigon Paragon, a US$35 million high-end shopping mall (July 2009)

== Made in China scandal ==
According to Vietnam's Law on Consumer Protection, Khai Silk has violated several regulations including Origin and Counterfeit goods by putting “Made in Vietnam” tags onto Chinese- made products and changing the ingredient. Further, The Ministry of Industry and Trade (“MOIT”) announced that it had completed product quality check-ups some silk items of Khai Duc Company Limited – the owner of the Khai Silk brand. The inspection results showed that there was no silk ingredient in some products, despite the label of ingredients stating that the product is 100% silk.

About two months after the scandal broke out, at the end of 2017, Chairman of the Board of Directors, Hoang Khai, withdrew from the role of the company's legal representative, replaced by Director Nguyen Thu Nga (born in 1974). The shareholder structure also had slight fluctuations, although Mr. Hoang Khai still owned 99% of the capital, but Hoang Phi Phi (born in 1976) personally transferred the remaining 1% of capital to Ms. Nga.
