= TMA Solutions =

Privately owned software outsourcing company

- Company type: Privately Owned
- Industry: IT Services, IT Consulting
- Founded: Since 1997 Ho Chi Minh City, Vietnam
- Founder: Ms. Bui Ngoc Anh
- Headquarters: 111 Nguyen Dinh Chinh, Phu Nhuan District, Ho Chi Minh City, Vietnam
- Key people: Dr. Nguyen Huu Le (Chairman); Ms. Bui Ngoc Anh (CEO)
- Services: Software Outsourcing
- Number of employees: 4,000 (2024)
- Website: www.tmasolutions.com

TMA Solutions is a privately owned software outsourcing company in Vietnam, with headquarters in Ho Chi Minh City, Vietnam and other offices in Canada, United States, Australia, Singapore, Japan, Germany. TMA Solutions is one of the largest offshore software providers in Vietnam. In 2023, TMA reached 4,000 employees and was recognized as one of Vietnam’s Top 10 Industry 4.0 companies

== History ==
TMA was founded in 1997 with six engineers.
From 1998 to 2004, TMA has three offices with 300 engineers, and new customers from Europe, Australia, Singapore and India. On the list of 15 global companies with “Offshore Software Outsourcing Best Practices” (Aberdeen Group's report).
In 2005, TMA opened the first oversea office in Canada and became an international company providing software outsourcing. Between 2006 and 2008, TMA opened three new overseas offices in Japan, United States, and Europe. Achieved TL9000 and became Microsoft Gold Certified Partner.

- In 2009, Opened TMA Mobile Solutions(TMS), and had one new office in Australia.
- In 2010, Opened its first Research & Development (R&D) center called iRDC in Quang Trung Software City in Ho Chi Minh City. In 2011, TMA achieved CMMi Level 5, reached 1,000 employees

In 2012,

- Joined CeBIT exhibition, demonstrating several products in Hanover, Germany.
- A member of Viet Nam Software Association such as VINASA, Hochiminh Computer Association (HCA), etc.

1997 - 2000

- Established TMA Solutions with 6 software developers
- First customers from Canada, USA, and Japan
- Reached 100 employees
- Adopted RUP (Rational Unified Process)

2001 – 2005

- Reached 500 engineers
- Opened first overseas office in Canada
- Established R&D Center
- Established Training Center
- Achieved ISO 9000:2001
- Added 3 offices in Phu Nhuan district

2006 – 2010

- Reached 1,000 engineers
- Achieved CMMi Level 3 and TL 9000
- Adopted Agile
- Opened overseas offices in Japan, USA and Australia
- Established TMA Mobile Center
- Completed TMA Tower in Quang Trung software park

2011 – 2015

- Reached 1,800 engineers
- Established Data Solution Center
- Established IoT Center
- Established TMA UX/UI Design Center
- Achieved CMMi Level 5
- Achieved ISO/IEC 27001:2005

2016 – 2020

- Reached 2,500 employees
- Opened TMA Singapore
- Established TMA Innovation
- Opened TMA Innovation Park in central Vietnam
- Established 5G Center
- Established Automotive Software Center

2021 - 2023

- Reached 4,000 engineers
- Opened TMA Europe Office in Germany
- TMA Innovation Park in central Vietnam reached 600 engineers
- Established Hardware Lab

== Offices ==
- Vietnam: Ho Chi Minh City, Binh Dinh
- USA: San Jose
- Canada: Ottawa
- Germany: Munich
- Australia: Melbourne
- Japan: Tokyo
- Singapore: Singapore
