= Viglacera Corporation =

Vietnamese construction materials company

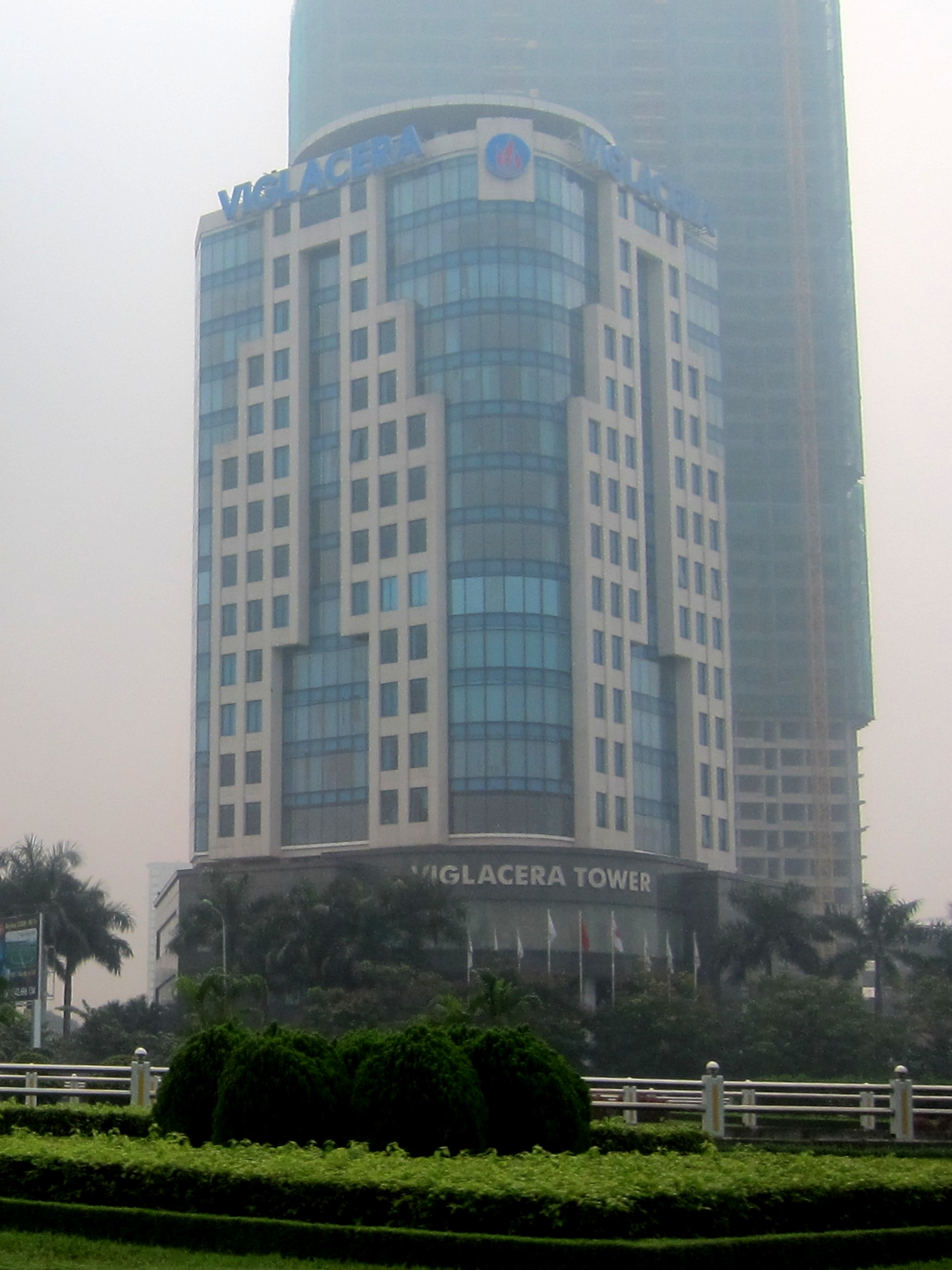
Head office of Viglacera Corporation

Viglacera Corporation is a construction materials company of Vietnam, manufacturing and selling ceramic floor tiles, stone floor tiles, wall tiles, cotto tiles, bricks, float glass, and plumbing fixtures such as sinks and toilets. The company is headquartered in the Từ Liêm District of Hanoi and it is listed on the Ho Chi Minh City Stock Exchange.

== See also ==
- Tiles
- Ceramics
- Float glass
- Decorative tilework and coloured brick

== Subsidiaries ==
Viglacera has over 30 subsidiary companies, employing over 18,000 people.
