= Petrolimex Joint Stock Insurance Company =

Petrolimex Joint Stock Insurance Company (PJICO) is state-owned insurance company in Vietnam, involved in the non-life insurance market. The company's stock is currently not listed on the Ho Chi Minh City Securities Trading Center and it is majority-owned by Petrolimex (51%), a state-owned petroleum company. The company is headquartered in Hanoi and has 49 branches most of Vietnam's provinces. PJICO is the fourth largest insurance provider in Vietnam, and it is the third largest non-life insurer. It had a share of around 10% in the insurance market (excluding life insurance) in 2011, making it fourth after Bao Viet Insurance, PetroVietnam Insurance and Bao Minh.
