= Binh Minh Plastic =

Vietnamese plastics company

- Company type: Joint Stock Company
- Traded as: HOSE: BMP
- Industry: Plastic
- Founded: 1977
- Headquarters: Ho Chi Minh City, Vietnam
- Key people: Le Quang Doanh (chairman); Nguyen Hoang Ngan (General Director); Nguyen Thi Phuong Nga (Supervisory Board)
- Revenue: 1,852.67 bn VND (2011)
- Operating income: 384,28 bn VND (2011)
- Net income: 294.53 bn VND (2011)
- Website: http://www.binhminhplastic.com/

Binh Minh Plastic Joint Stock Company (Công ty Cổ phần Nhựa Bình Minh) is a Vietnamese plastics company. It is listed in the Ho Chi Minh City Stock Exchange since 2006.

It is one of southern Vietnam's leading plastics companies, with major competitors being Tan Tien, Rang Dong, Tan Phu, Van Don, Minh Hung and Cong Nghia.

== History ==
Binh Minh Plastic was set up after a merger of Kepivi (Công ty ống nhựa hoá học Việt Nam) and Kieu Tinh Plastic (Công ty Nhựa Kiều Tinh công tư hợp doanh) in 1977. It was part of Vinaplast Group (Tổng Công ty Nhựa Việt Nam) from 1994 until 2003, when Vinaplast was dissolved and Binh Minh Plastic became a joint stock company.

== Financial Information ==
	Turnover (bn VND)	Profit before tax (vn VND)	Net profit (bn VND)
2011	1,852.67	384,28	294.53
2010	1,441.66	313.73	275.3
2009	1,156.15	285.16	249.92
2008	831.58	114.13	95.92
2007	680.23	111.27	96.01
2006	503.62	98.78	84.95
2005	423.17	66.92	66.92

== Production ==
Binh Minh Plastic has a subsidiary in northern Vietnam with a capital stock of 100 bn VND (Công ty TNHH MTV Nhựa Bình Minh Miền Bắc), which operates a factory in Pho Noi A Industrial Park in Hưng Yên Province since 2007.

Construction on the companies fourth factory started in 2010 in Long An Province. It will be its largest and most modern. It is expected to start operation in 2013 and help increase output to 100,000 tonnes of products per year and revenue to 3 trillion dong.
