= Petrolimex Gas =

Petroleum gas company in Vietnam

Petrolimex Gas Corporation JSC (PGC:VN) is a liquefied petroleum gas state company in Vietnam, involved in the import, export, distribution and sale of LPG for commercial, residential and industrial uses. The company's stock is listed on the Ho Chi Minh City Securities Trading Center and it is majority-owned by Petrolimex, which is "Vietnam National Petroleum Group", a petroleum company of the Vietnam government. The company's main offices are located in Hanoi; tank farms and container terminals are located in Hanoi, Hai Phong, Da Nang, Ho Chi Minh City and Can Tho. The company's LPG distribution network includes more than 40 companies and a multitude of bottled gas agents and retailers.
