= PetroVietnam Insurance =

- PetroVietnam Insurance in Vũng Tàu, 2012
- Type: Joint-stock company
- Industry: Insurance
- Founded: 1996
- Headquarters: Hanoi, Vietnam
- Revenue: 5500 bn VND (2012)
- Operating income: 405 bn VND (2012)
- Owner: PetroVietnam 1996-2023, Talanx 2023-
- Website: http://pvi.com.vn/en/home.aspx

PetroVietnam Insurance Joint-Stock Company (PVI Vietnamese: Tổng công ty Cổ phần Bảo hiểm Dầu khí Việt Nam) is a Vietnamese insurance company. The state-owned PetroVietnam holds a controlling stake in PVI.

It had a share of around 20% in the insurance market (excluding life insurance) in 2025, making it the largest insurer, and followed by Bao Viet Insurance, Bao Minh and PJICO. It has been the only one of the four big insurers that were able to significantly increase their market share from just over 10% in 2005, while market leader Bao Viet and Bao Minh have continuously lost market shares.

PVI Insurance is a non-life insurer in Vietnam by market share, revenue, and capital, and holds an A- Financial Strength Rating from AM Best for four consecutive years since 2023.

PVI is the first non-life insurance company in Vietnam to achieve a revenue scale of USD 1 billion

PVI has a strategic partnership with Talanx AG, a German insurer. Talanx has been holding 25% of PVI's shares since August 2011 and decided to acquire another 6% in May 2012.

In 2023, Talanx decide to take over 80% of PVI. In the future, they take the rest 20% from PetroVietnam
