= Vinatex =

Vietnamese state-owned textile company

- Type: State-owned enterprise
- Industry: Textile industry, garments
- Website: www.vinatex.com

The Vietnam National Textile and Garment Group (Vinatex) (Tập đoàn dệt may Việt Nam) is a Vietnamese textile company. The company's 'productive sector' consists of over 50 joint stock companies, and 40 joint venture companies, principally involved in manufacture; other listed company sectors include fashion magazines, fashion design institutes and textile-industry vocational schools, universities, real estate, supper market.

Vinatex produces a wide variety of textiles and garments, with the capacity to produce over 250,000,000 square feet (23,000,000 m^{2}) of fabric per year.

In the first half of 2011 Vinatex' exports reached 1.22bn US$, 20% of the country's total textile exports of 6.16bn.

== History ==
In April 1995, the Vietnam National Textile and Garment Corporation, the predecessor of today's Vinatex Group, was established. Vinatex was formed by merging enterprises under the Vietnam Textile Corporation and the Garment Production-Import Export Union.

On May 6, 2014, the Prime Minister of Vietnam approved the equitization plan of Vietnam National Textile and Garment Group. Vinatex then successfully conducted its initial public offering (IPO) on September 22, 2014. In January 2015, Vinatex held its first General Meeting of Shareholders. After the meeting, on January 29, 2015, the company received the Certificate of Business Registration for a Joint Stock Company from the Hanoi Department of Planning and Investment.

In 2021, Vietnam National Textile and Garment Group (Vinatex) achieved a revenue of over 16,100 billion VND, an increase of 15.7% compared to the same period in 2020. Profit before tax reached 1,446 billion VND, an increase of 145% compared to the same period in 2020. In 2023, Vinatex's consolidated revenue is estimated to reach 17,225 billion VND, 104.4% of the plan; profit before tax is estimated to reach 377 billion VND, 101.9% of the plan.

== Regional Organization of Production ==
Vinatex is in a process of decentralizing its production away from major industrial cities to take advantage of lower wages and cheaper land in the provinces. The majority of Vietnam's textiles industry is still located in Ho Chi Minh City, Hanoi and neighbouring provinces. Vinatex started supporting subsidiaries to move out of Hanoi into neighbouring provinces such as Hưng Yên in 2004. It announced a strategy to move production closer to the home provinces of its workforces in July 2011 to respond to high costs of labour and land in the main industrial centres of Ho Chi Minh City and Hanoi. The following provinces have been mentioned as having large potential for the development of textile manufacturing:

- Northeast: Phú Thọ Province, Tuyên Quang Province, Thái Nguyên Province
- North Central Coast: Thanh Hóa Province, Nghệ An Province, Quảng Trị Province, Huế
- South Central Coast: Quảng Nam Province, Bình Định Province, Phú Yên Province
- Mekong Delta: Tiền Giang Province, Đồng Tháp Province
- Southeast: Tây Ninh Province

Transport costs are a major challenge in this strategy, since container shipping costs even from a major port such as Da Nang Port are estimated by Vinatext to be twice as high as in Ho Chi Minh City. As part of this strategy Vinatex also acquired Đại Cát Tường, a formerly loss-making textile manufacturer in Quảng Ngãi Province.

== Joint-Ventures ==
Vinatex set up a joint-venture with PetroVietnam (PetroVietnam-Vinatex Dinh Vu Joint Stock Company (PVTex)) to build Vietnam's first polyester fiber plant. The factory will be located in Haiphong and use by-products from oil-refining. It will help to reduce the Vinatex' dependence on imported materials by meeting around 40% of the domestic apparel industry's demand for synthetic fiber.
