= Quảng Ngãi (city) =

- Provincial city (Class-2)
- Quảng Ngãi City; Thành phố Quảng Ngãi
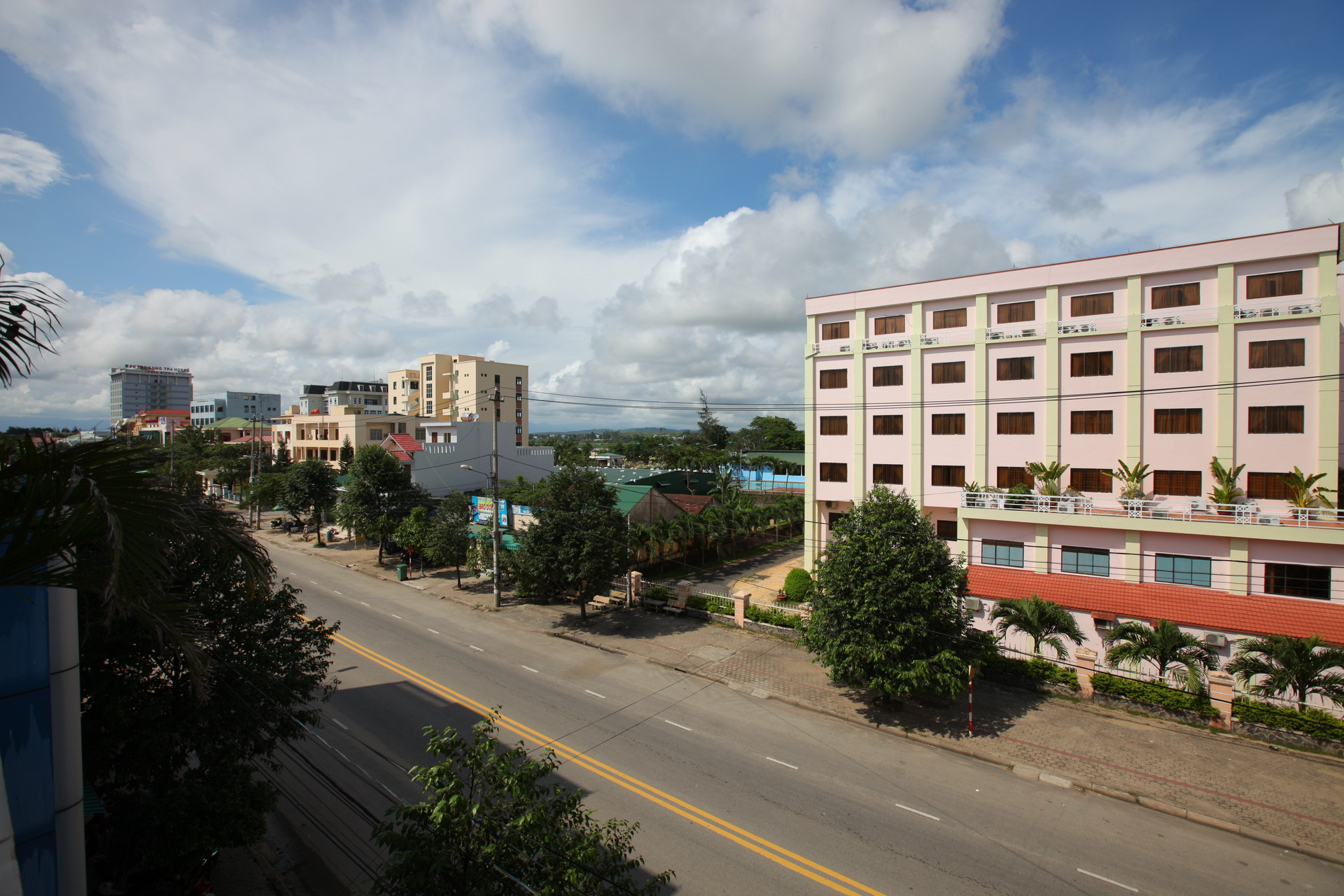

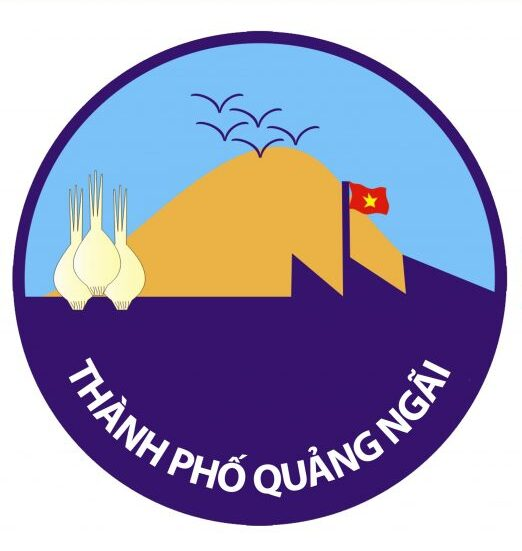
- Seal

- Location within of Quảng Ngãi in Vietnam Quảng Ngãi (Southeast Asia) Quảng Ngãi (Asia)
- Coordinates: 15°7′N 108°48′E
- Country: Vietnam
- Province: Quảng Ngãi Province

Area
  - Total: 160.1534 km^{2} (61.8356 sq mi)

Population (2019)
  - Total: 278,496
  - Density: 1.738/km^{2} (4.50/sq mi)
- Time zone: UTC+07:00 (Indochina Time)
- Climate: Am

Quảng Ngãi is a city in central Vietnam. It serves as the capital city of Quảng Ngãi Province. Quảng Ngãi City borders Tư Nghĩa District to the South and West, Sơn Tịnh District to the Northwest and Bình Sơn District to the North. It has an area of 160.15 km^{2} and population of 278,496 inhabitants.

== Climate ==
Quảng Ngãi has a tropical monsoon climate (Köppen Am). Temperatures are very warm to hot year round, although they do fall substantially between October and March. The rainy season lasts from September to December with a major risk of typhoons and the dry season is from January to August.

Climate data for Quảng Ngãi
Month	Jan	Feb	Mar	Apr	May	Jun	Jul	Aug	Sep	Oct	Nov	Dec	Year
Record high °C (°F)	33.6 (92.5)	35.3 (95.5)	37.6 (99.7)	39.4 (102.9)	40.2 (104.4)	41.4 (106.5)	40.3 (104.5)	40.4 (104.7)	39.0 (102.2)	35.8 (96.4)	33.7 (92.7)	32.4 (90.3)	41.4 (106.5)
Mean daily maximum °C (°F)	25.7 (78.3)	27.1 (80.8)	29.4 (84.9)	32.1 (89.8)	34.0 (93.2)	34.6 (94.3)	34.6 (94.3)	34.2 (93.6)	32.3 (90.1)	29.8 (85.6)	27.7 (81.9)	25.6 (78.1)	30.6 (87.1)
Daily mean °C (°F)	21.7 (71.1)	22.5 (72.5)	24.4 (75.9)	26.7 (80.1)	28.5 (83.3)	29.1 (84.4)	29.0 (84.2)	28.6 (83.5)	27.4 (81.3)	25.9 (78.6)	24.3 (75.7)	22.4 (72.3)	25.9 (78.6)
Mean daily minimum °C (°F)	19.4 (66.9)	19.9 (67.8)	21.4 (70.5)	23.5 (74.3)	25.0 (77.0)	25.5 (77.9)	25.2 (77.4)	25.1 (77.2)	24.4 (75.9)	23.4 (74.1)	22.1 (71.8)	20.3 (68.5)	22.9 (73.2)
Record low °C (°F)	12.4 (54.3)	14.1 (57.4)	13.4 (56.1)	17.3 (63.1)	19.6 (67.3)	20.0 (68.0)	21.1 (70.0)	20.0 (68.0)	20.6 (69.1)	17.0 (62.6)	15.5 (59.9)	12.9 (55.2)	12.4 (54.3)
Average rainfall mm (inches)	127.2 (5.01)	43.3 (1.70)	40.0 (1.57)	45.8 (1.80)	90.6 (3.57)	96.9 (3.81)	89.8 (3.54)	134.7 (5.30)	319.6 (12.58)	644.2 (25.36)	586.1 (23.07)	303.3 (11.94)	2,529.7 (99.59)
Average rainy days	15.3	8.5	5.8	5.4	9.0	8.5	9.7	12.4	16.2	20.9	21.9	21.3	154.6
Average relative humidity (%)	87.2	86.2	84.9	83.0	80.3	78.5	78.7	80.1	84.3	87.2	88.1	88.2	83.9
Mean monthly sunshine hours	121.7	153.4	204.0	277.5	253.1	235.2	241.2	222.7	183.8	154.4	113.9	85.8	2,203.3
Source 1: Vietnam Institute for Building Science and Technology
Source 2: The Yearbook of Indochina (1932-1933)

== Tourism ==
Quảng Ngãi has benefited little from Vietnamese tourist industry. English is not widely spoken and most hotels deal only with Vietnamese customers.

Local attractions include:

- Mỹ Lai Massacre Memorial Museum (12 km from Quảng Ngãi)
- Ba Tơ Garden
- Quảng Ngãi Square (Phạm Văn Đồng street)
- Trà Khúc River
- Tam Thương Quay
- Thiên Bút Hill
- General Museum of Quảng Ngãi Province
- Ly Son Island
- My Khe Beach (this is in Da Nang)
- Châu Sa Champa Citadel (Ancient Amaravati)

== Transportation ==
Quảng Ngãi has rail connections to North-South Railways via Quảng Ngãi railway station. Air transport is served by Chu Lai International Airport in nearby province of Quảng Nam.

== Famous Quang Ngai people ==
- Politician: Phạm Văn Đồng, Trương Định, Lê Văn Duyệt, Trần Đức Lương, Nguyễn Thị Diệu, Nguyễn Hòa Bình, Nguyễn Bá Loan
- Entrepreneur: Nguyễn Văn Đạt, Cao Thị Ngọc Dung, Lê Thăng Long
- Education: Lê Vinh Danh, Phan Kỳ Phùng
- Religion: Thích Nhất Hạnh, Ching Hai
- Sport: Hoàng Văn Phúc, Nguyễn Trần Duy Nhất, Phạm Thị Bình, Ngô Bông
- Artist: Dương Ngọc Thái, Thanh Tuấn
- Musician: Trương Quang Lục, Hồng Xương Long
- Generals: Nguyễn Chánh (Quảng Ngãi), Trần Văn Trà, Trần Quý Hai, Phạm Kiệt, Võ Thứ, Nguyễn Đôn, Tiêu Văn Mẫn, Trịnh Lương Hy, Võ Bẩm, Trần Tiến Cung, Huỳnh Kim, Châu Khải Định, Lê Trung Ngôn, Phạm Quang Tiệp, Trần Nam Trung, Trần Quang Phương, Nguyễn Văn Được, Võ Thị Thái, Vũ Xuân Viên, Huỳnh Thị Cúc, Nguyễn Thị Dung, Nguyễn Tăng Long, Nguyễn Văn Xuân (tướng nhà Nguyễn)

== Education ==
- Le Khiet High School for the Gifted
