= Hanoi Stock Exchange =

Stock exchange in Hanoi, Vietnam

- Sở Giao dịch Chứng khoán Hà Nội
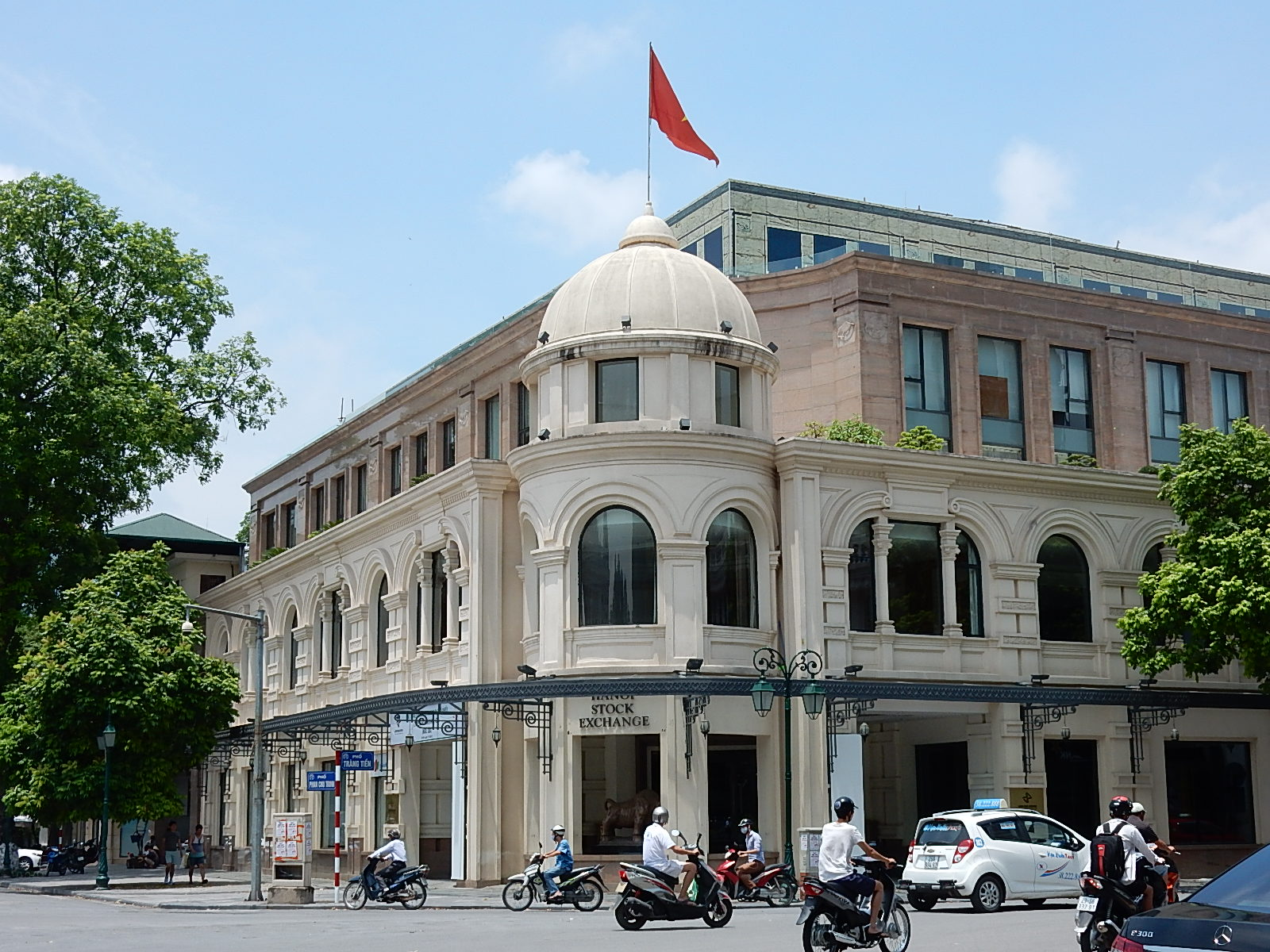
- Type: Stock exchange
- Location: Hanoi, Vietnam
- Coordinates: 21.023339°N 105.856627°E
- Founded: 3 August 2005; 20 years ago
- Owner: Vietnam Ministry of Finance
- Key people: Nguyen Duy Thinh (Chairman); Nguyen Anh Phong (General Director)
- Currency: VND
- No. of listings: ~500 (UPCoM)
- Indices: HNX-Index, UPCoM-Index
- Website: Exchange website

Hanoi Stock Exchange (HNX), formerly the Hanoi Securities Trading Center (Hanoi STC) until 2009, is located at No. 02, Phan Chu Trinh, Hoan Kiem District, Hanoi, Vietnam. The exchange was launched on March 8, 2005, and handles auctions and trading of stocks and bonds. It was the second securities trading center to open in Vietnam after the Ho Chi Minh City Securities Trading Center.

== History ==
=== Early establishment ===
The HNX was established through Decision No. 01/2009/QĐ-TTg by the Prime Minister, transforming and restructuring the Hanoi Securities Trading Center, which was originally established under Decision No. 127/1998/QĐ-TTg. The original trading center came into operation on March 8, 2005, and on June 24, 2009, HNX was officially inaugurated as a State-owned single-member limited liability company owned by the Ministry of Finance.

=== Market development ===
At the end of 2006, the combined market capitalization of both Ho Chi Minh City Securities Trading Center and Hanoi Securities Trading Center was 14 billion USD, representing 22.7% of Vietnam's GDP.

On June 24, 2009, HNX officially launched the UPCoM (Unlisted Public Companies Market) trading floor with 10 listed stocks, designed to facilitate unlisted businesses' participation in the market. As of 2024, UPCoM has grown to include over 500 stock codes.

=== Recent developments ===
On May 18, 2015, HNX joined the United Nations Sustainable Stock Exchanges (SSE) initiative as part of the SSE's regional dialogue in Bangkok hosted by the Stock Exchange of Thailand.

From 2020, HNX has served primarily as Vietnam's bonds exchange and operates the UPCoM market, while most stock trading was transferred to the HOSE.

On December 23, 2020, the Prime Minister issued Decision No. 37/2020/QD-TTg establishing the Vietnam Stock Exchange. Under this decision, both the Hanoi Stock Exchange and Ho Chi Minh Stock Exchange became subsidiaries with 100% of their charter capital owned by the Vietnam Stock Exchange.

== Operations ==
=== Trading hours ===
HNX operates Monday through Friday with trading sessions from 9:00 AM to 11:30 AM (morning session) and 1:00 PM to 3:00 PM (afternoon session), with a lunch break from 11:30 AM to 1:00 PM. The exchange operates in the Asia/Ho_Chi_Minh timezone (GMT+07:00).

=== Market segments ===
HNX operates several market segments:

- Government Bond Market: Centralized government bond bidding and trading since 2006
- Corporate Bond Market: Including both public and private corporate bonds
- UPCoM (Unlisted Public Companies Market): For unlisted public companies
- Derivatives Market: Launched in August 2017

=== Market indices ===
The exchange maintains two primary indices:

- HNX-Index: The main stock index, which closed at 227.43 points at the end of 2024
- UPCoM-Index: Tracking unlisted public companies, ending 2024 at 95.06 points

=== Price limits ===
Trading on HNX operates with daily price limit mechanisms: 10% fluctuation limit for regular stocks, which can extend to 30% for newly listed stocks or stocks resuming trading after suspension for more than 25 days. For UPCoM, the limit is 15% normally and can reach 40% on the first trading day or resumption after suspension.

=== Foreign investment ===
Foreign investors are permitted to invest up to a limit of 49% ownership of companies, except banks where the limit was 30%. Foreign ownership limits in securities trading firms depend on whether the investor is an individual or organization and whether certain qualifying conditions are met.

== Leadership ==
As of 2024, HNX is led by:

- Chairman: Nguyen Duy Thinh
- General Director: Nguyen Anh Phong

== See also ==
- List of ASEAN stock exchanges by market capitalization
- Ho Chi Minh City Stock Exchange
- Vietnam Stock Exchange
- UPCoM
