= Long Hiệp (disambiguation) =

Long Hiệp may refer to several places in Vietnam, including:

- Long Hiệp, a commune of Vĩnh Long province
- Long Hiệp, Long An, a former commune of Bến Lức District
- Long Hiệp, Quảng Ngãi, a former commune of Minh Long District
