= Long Hiệp =

- Commune
- Sà Vần Pagoda
- Interactive map of Long Hiệp
- Coordinates: 9°42′54″N 106°21′13″E
- Country: Vietnam
- Province: Vĩnh Long
- Region: Mekong Delta
- Established: 16 June 2025
- Seat: Ấp Chợ

Area
  - Total: 65.17 km^{2} (25.16 sq mi)

Population (31 December 2024)
  - Total: 32,425
  - Density: 497/km^{2} (1,290/sq mi)

Long Hiệp is a commune in Vĩnh Long province, Vietnam.

On 16 June 2025, the Standing Committee of the National Assembly of Vietnam adopted Resolution No. 1687/NQ-UBTVQH15 on the reorganization of commune-level administrative units in Vĩnh Long province in 2025. Under the resolution, the entire area and population of the communes of Long Hiệp, Tân Hiệp, and Ngọc Biên were consolidated to form a new commune named Long Hiệp.
