= List of the busiest airports in Vietnam =

Statistic for busiest airports in Vietnam is supplied by Airports Corporation of Vietnam (ACV). In 2016, ACV is operating 22 airports, of which 9 are international.

== Passenger traffic ==
=== 2020s ===
No.	Airport name	Province	City served	IATA	ICAO	2020	2021	2022	2023	2024	2025
1	Tan Son Nhat International Airport	Ho Chi Minh City	Ho Chi Minh City	SGN	VVTS	22,062,893	10,287,611	34,278,320	40,738,295	39,859,384	42,413,299
2	Noi Bai International Airport	Hanoi	Hanoi	HAN	VVNB	16,473,214	Unknown	24,430,000	29,811,636	29,944,554	33,901,329
3	Da Nang International Airport	Da Nang	Da Nang	DAD	VVDN	Unknown	Unknown	8,900,000	13,051,299	13,401,239	15,285,689
4	Cam Ranh International Airport	Khánh Hòa	Nha Trang	CXR	VVCR	3,305,057	972,817	3,860,541	5,700,000	6,800,000	7,300,000
5	Phu Quoc International Airport	An Giang	Phú Quốc	PQC	VVPQ	Unknown	Unknown	Unknown	4,215,260	3,849,330	5,898,916
6	Cat Bi International Airport	Haiphong	Haiphong	HPH	VVCI	Unknown	Unknown	2,979,000	2,767,567	2,285,040	2,441,523
7	Vinh International Airport	Nghệ An	Vinh	VII	VVVH	2,000,000	1,100,000	2,650,000	2,600,000	Unknown	Unknown
8	Phu Bai International Airport	Huế	Huế	HUI	VVPB	Unknown	Unknown	2,100,000	Unknown	Unknown	Unknown
9	Lien Khuong International Airport	Lâm Đồng	Da Lat	DLI	VVDL	Unknown	Unknown	2,960,000	2,548,000	Unknown	Unknown
10	Buon Ma Thuot Airport	Đắk Lắk	Buon Ma Thuot	BMV	VVBM	988,400	591,077	Unknown	1,400,000	Unknown	Unknown
11	Phu Cat Airport	Gia Lai	Quy Nhon	UIH	VVPC	Unknown	Unknown	2,360,000	Unknown	Unknown	Unknown
12	Can Tho International Airport	Cần Thơ	Cần Thơ	VCA	VVCT	2,245,670	513,000	Unknown	Unknown	1,035,000	1,140,000
13	Pleiku Airport	Gia Lai	Pleiku	PXU	VVPK	Unknown	Unknown	Unknown	Unknown	Unknown	Unknown
14	Con Dao Airport	Ho Chi Minh City	Côn Đảo	VCS	VVCS	447,750	Unknown	464,958	417,491	Unknown	676,125
15	Tho Xuan Airport	Thanh Hóa	Thanh Hóa	THD	VVTX	1,211,928	757,706	1,596,695	1,200,000	945,000	1,400,000
16	Dong Hoi Airport	Quảng Trị	Đồng Hới	VDH	VVDH	487,746	276,135	718,203	774,815	Unknown	Unknown
17	Dien Bien Airport	Điện Biên	Điện Biên Phủ	DIN	VVDB	Unknown	Unknown	Unknown	Unknown	Unknown	Unknown
18	Tuy Hoa Airport	Đắk Lắk	Tuy Hòa	TBB	VVTH	361,181	Unknown	Unknown	Unknown	432,219	Unknown
19	Chu Lai Airport	Da Nang	Tam Kỳ	VCL	VVCA	Unknown	Unknown	Unknown	Unknown	Unknown	Unknown
20	Rạch Giá Airport	An Giang	Rạch Giá	VKG	VVRG	Unknown	Unknown	51,254	33,390	9,536	Unknown
21	Van Don International Airport	Quảng Ninh	Hạ Long	VDO	VVVD	Unknown	Unknown	158,316	153,917	81,000	Unknown
22	Ca Mau Airport	Cà Mau	Cà Mau	CAH	VVCM	37,995	34,400	30,698	Unknown	38,500	Unknown
23	Nà Sản Airport	Sơn La	Sơn La	SQH	VVNS	not operational					

=== 2010s ===
No.	Airport name	Province	City served	IATA	ICAO	2012	2013	2014	2015	2016	2017	2018	2019
1	Tan Son Nhat International Airport	Ho Chi Minh City	Ho Chi Minh City	SGN	VVTS	17,538,353	20,035,152	22,153,349	26,546,475	32,486,537	35,996,014	38,414,737	41,243,240
2	Noi Bai International Airport	Hanoi	Hanoi	HAN	VVNB	11,341,039	12,825,784	14,190,675	17,213,715	20,596,632	23,824,400	25,908,048	29,304,631
3	Da Nang International Airport	Da Nang	Da Nang	DAD	VVDN	3,090,877	4,376,775	4,989,687	6,722,587	8,783,429	10,801,927	13,229,663	15,543,598
4	Cam Ranh International Airport	Khánh Hòa	Nha Trang	CXR	VVCR	1,095,776	1,509,212	2,062,494	2,722,833	4,858,362	6,500,000	8,250,000	9,747,172
5	Phu Quoc International Airport	Kiên Giang	Phú Quốc	PQC	VVPQ	493,434	685,036	1,002,750	1,467,043	2,278,814	3,000,000	3,200,000	3,700,205
6	Cat Bi International Airport	Hai Phong	Hai Phong	HPH	VVCI	683,574	872,762	927,001	1,256,719	1,800,000	2,089,000	2,373,700	2,639,000
7	Vinh Airport	Nghệ An	Vinh	VII	VVVH	635,277	917,638	1,222,698	1,300,000	1,563,387	1,800,000	1,880,000	1,950,000
8	Phu Bai International Airport	Thừa Thiên Huế	Hue	HUI	VVPB	673,044	427,582	1,159,499	1,300,000	1,550,000	1,750,000	1,831,000	1,931,939
9	Lien Khuong Airport	Lâm Đồng	Da Lat	DLI	VVDL	387,925	476,438	675,607	862,164	1,262,513	1,530,000	1,690,000	2,000,000
10	Buon Ma Thuot Airport	Đắk Lắk	Buon Me Thuot	BMV	VVBM	410,724	535,084	695,147	830,000	1,220,000	Unknown	909,907	1,003,419
11	Phu Cat Airport	Bình Định	Quy Nhon	UIH	VVPC	236,254	290,832	420,520	630,935	1,030,000	1,500,000	1,126,156	1,572,000
12	Can Tho International Airport	Cần Thơ	Cần Thơ	VCA	VVCT	200,751	241,307	305,015	481,447	550,090	612,512	835,100	1,335,000
13	Pleiku Airport	Gia Lai	Pleiku	PXU	VVPK	319,833	319,994	300,471	237,564	797,509	753,784	720,000	726,526
14	Con Dao Airport	Bà Rịa–Vũng Tàu	Côn Đảo	VCS	VVCS	191,039	175,574	188,549	231,679	293,932	373.978	400,950	430,841
15	Tho Xuan Airport	Thanh Hóa	Thanh Hóa	THD	VVTX	—N/a	90,929	163,270	570,713	828,930	865,534	939,000	1,053,000
16	Dong Hoi Airport	Quảng Bình	Đồng Hới	VDH	VVDH	81,764	105,586	117,656	261,372	365,000	470,000	534,856	539,908
17	Dien Bien Airport	Điện Biên	Điện Biên Phủ	DIN	VVDB	73,372	74,272	81,564	Unknown	70,302	70,486	58,000	57,339
18	Tuy Hoa Airport	Phú Yên	Tuy Hòa	TBB	VVTH	62,825	63,103	64,037	107,843	326,982	337,000	403,000	433,285
19	Chu Lai International Airport	Quảng Nam	Tam Ky	VCL	VVCA	53,753	50,974	40,198	154,549	553,285	673,000	760,000	944,313
20	Rạch Giá Airport	Kiên Giang	Rạch Giá	VKG	VVRG	60,180	52,409	33,544	Unknown	Unknown	Unknown	35,500	32,000
21	Van Don International Airport	Quảng Ninh	Hạ Long	VDO	VVVD	not operational							260,434
22	Ca Mau Airport	Cà Mau	Cà Mau	CAH	VVCM	37,995	34,400	30,698	Unknown	Unknown	Unknown	38,500	37,000
23	Nà Sản Airport	Sơn La	Sơn La	SQH	VVNS	not operational							

Nà Sản Airport has had no regular route since 2001 while Tho Xuan Airport was not in service in 2012.

== Cargo traffic ==
All figures are in metric tonnes.

No.	Airport name	Province	City served	2016	2017	2018	2019	2020	2021	2022	2023	2024	2025
1	Noi Bai International Airport	Hanoi	Hanoi	566,000	712,677	802,939	708,580	627,763	749,428	716,357	667,435	835,000	Unknown
2	Tan Son Nhat International Airport	Ho Chi Minh City	Ho Chi Minh City	430,627	566,644	735,801	693,239	592,394	663,166	593,774	516,262	Unknown	Unknown
3	Da Nang International Airport	Da Nang	Da Nang	Unknown	Unknown	30,015	40,000	Unknown	Unknown	Unknown	Unknown	34,000	41,561
4	Cat Bi International Airport	Haiphong	Haiphong	Unknown	Unknown	17,128	Unknown	Unknown	Unknown	Unknown	15,430	12,541	11,950
