= List of airports in Vietnam =

Airports in Vietnam

This is a list of airports in Vietnam, grouped by type and sorted by location. A majority (but not all) civil airports in Vietnam are managed and operated by Airports Corporation of Vietnam.

== Civil airports ==
Location	Province/municipality	ICAO	IATA	Airport name	Coordinates
International airports
Thới An Đông ward	Cần Thơ	VVCT	VCA	Can Tho International Airport	10°05′07″N 105°42′43″E
Đức Trọng commune	Lâm Đồng province	VVDL	DLI	Lien Khuong International Airport	11°45′02″N 108°22′25″E
Hòa Cường ward	Da Nang	VVDN	DAD	Da Nang International Airport	16°02′38″N 108°11′58″E
Hải An ward	Haiphong	VVCI	HPH	Cat Bi International Airport	20°49′09″N 106°43′29″E
Vân Đồn special zone	Quảng Ninh province	VVVD	VDO	Van Don International Airport	21°07′04″N 107°24′51″E
Nội Bài commune	Hanoi	VVNB	HAN	Noi Bai International Airport	21°13′16″N 105°48′26″E
Tân Sơn ward	Ho Chi Minh City	VVTS	SGN	Tan Son Nhat International Airport	10°49′08″N 106°39′07″E
Phú Bài ward	Huế	VVPB	HUI	Phu Bai International Airport	16°24′06″N 107°42′10″E
Bắc Cam Ranh ward	Khánh Hòa province	VVCR	CXR	Cam Ranh International Airport	11°59′53″N 109°13′10″E
Phú Quốc special zone	An Giang province	VVPQ	PQC	Phu Quoc International Airport	10°10′18″N 103°59′28″E
Vinh Hưng ward	Nghệ An province	VVVH	VII	Vinh International Airport	18°44′12.21″N 105°40′15.17″E
Domestic airports
Tân Lập ward	Đắk Lắk province	VVBM	BMV	Buon Ma Thuot Airport	12°40′05″N 108°07′12″E
Phú Yên ward	Đắk Lắk province	VVTH	TBB	Tuy Hoa Airport	13°02′58″N 109°20′01″E
Hòa Thành ward	Cà Mau province	VVCM	CAH	Ca Mau Airport	09°10′32″N 105°10′46″E
Chu Lai commune	Da Nang	VVCA	VCL	Chu Lai Airport	15°24′22″N 108°42′20″E
Côn Đảo special zone	Ho Chi Minh City	VVCS	VCS	Con Dao Airport	08°43′57″N 106°37′44″E
Vũng Tàu ward	Ho Chi Minh City	VVVT	VTG	Vung Tau Airport	10°22′0″N 107°05′0″E
Điện Biên Phủ ward	Điện Biên province	VVDB	DIN	Dien Bien Airport	21°23′50″N 103°00′28″E
Đồng Thuận ward	Quảng Trị province	VVDH	VDH	Dong Hoi Airport	17°30′54″N 106°35′26″E
Thống Nhất ward	Gia Lai province	VVPK	PXU	Pleiku Airport	14°00′16″N 108°01′02″E
Phù Cát commune	Gia Lai province	VVPC	UIH	Phu Cat Airport	13°57′18″N 109°02′32″E
Rạch Giá ward	An Giang province	VVRG	VKG	Rach Gia Airport	9°57′35″N 105°8′2″E
Sao Vàng commune	Thanh Hóa province	VVTX	THD	Tho Xuan Airport	19°54′6″N 105°28′4″E

== Military AFBs ==
Location	Province/municipality	ICAO	IATA	Airport name	Coordinates
Active
Lạng Giang commune	Bắc Ninh province	VVKP		Kép Air Base	21°23′23″N 106°15′09″E
Tân Triều ward	Đồng Nai province	VVBA		Bien Hoa Air Base	10°58′37″N 106°49′06″E
Bắc Cam Ranh ward	Khánh Hòa province	VVCR	CXR	Cam Ranh Air Base	
Bắc Cam Ranh ward	Khánh Hòa province			Cam Ranh Naval Base Airstrip	
Đô Vinh ward	Khánh Hòa province	VVPR	PHA	Phan Rang Air Base	
Trường Sa special zone	Khánh Hòa province			Truong Sa Airport	8°38′43″N 111°55′14″E
Yên Bài commune	Hanoi	VVYL		Hòa Lạc Air Base	21°02′17.79″N 105°29′23.7″E
Long Biên ward	Hanoi	VVGL		Gia Lam Airbase	21°02′27.51″N 105°53′09.64″E
Kiến An, Haiphong	Haiphong	VV03		Kien An Airport	20°48′12″N 106°36′17″E
Nam Cường ward	Lào Cai province	VVYB		Yên Bái Air Base	
Inactive
Cam Ly – Đà Lạt ward	Lâm Đồng province	VVCL		Cam Ly Airport	11°56′34″N 108°24′54″E
Ngũ Hành Sơn ward	Da Nang			Nước Mặn Air Base (using as a helicopter base)	
	Quảng Ngãi province			Quảng Ngãi Airfield	

== Proposed airports ==
Location	Province	ICAO	IATA	Airport name	Coordinates
Long Thành commune	Đồng Nai	VVLT	LTH	Long Thanh International Airport	
Bảo Hà commune	Lào Cai			Sapa Airport	
Mũi Né ward	Lâm Đồng	VVPT		Phan Thiet Airport	
Gio Linh commune	Quảng Trị			Quang Tri Airport	
Gia Bình commune	Bắc Ninh			Gia Bình International Airport	

== Former airports ==
Location	ICAO	IATA	Airport name	Coordinates
Phú Quốc, Kiên Giang	VVPQ	PQC	Duong Dong Airport	
Đông Hà, Quảng Trị			Dong Ha Airfield	16°46′30″N 107°9′47″E
Tây Ninh, Tây Ninh			Tay Ninh West Airfield	
Trà Vinh, Trà Vinh	VVTV	PHU	Phu Vinh Airport	9°55′24″N 106°19′42″E
Vĩnh Long, Vĩnh Long		XVL	Vinh Long Airfield	10°15′5″N 105°56′49″E
Bảo Lộc, Lâm Đồng			Loc Phat Airfield	
Thủ Dầu Một, Bình Dương			Phu Loi Airfield	11°0′0″N 106°41′55″E
Sơn La, Sơn La province	VVNS	SQH	Na San Airport	21°12′53″N 104°02′7″E
Chiêm Hóa, Cao Bằng Province			Soi Đúng Airbase	

== See also ==
- Transport in Vietnam
- List of airports by ICAO code: V#VV - Vietnam
- List of the busiest airports in Vietnam
- Wikipedia: WikiProject Aviation/Airline destination lists: Asia#Viet Nam
