= Airports Corporation of Vietnam =

Vietnamese Airport Operator

Airports Corporation of Vietnam - JSC
- Logo used from 2024
- Trade name: Airports Corporation of Vietnam (ACV)
- Native name: Tổng công ty Cảng hàng không Việt Nam - CTCP
- Type: Joint-stock company with 95.4% state-owned shares
- Industry: Aviation, Airport Management, Aircraft ground handling
- Predecessor: 3 corporations managing 3 groups of civil airports in Vietnam
- Founded: January 8, 2012
- Founder: Minister of Transport and Communication of Vietnam
- Headquarters: 58 Trường Sơn, Tân Sơn Hòa ward, Ho Chi Minh City, Vietnam
- Area served: Airports
- Key people: Lại Xuân Thanh (Chairman); Lê Mạnh Hùng (CEO, 2012-2018); Vũ Thế Phiệt (CEO, 2018-now)
- Services: All civil airports in Vietnam
- Owner: Government of Vietnam and other share holders
- Website: https://acv.vn/en

Airports Corporation of Vietnam (ACV; Vietnamese: Tổng công ty Cảng hàng không Việt Nam) is a Vietnamese state-owned joint-stock company, headquartered in Ho Chi Minh City. The company, operated under the Ministry of Transport of Vietnam, was founded on January 8, 2012 when three companies operating airports in the north, the middle, and the south of Vietnam were merged on February 28, 2012.

== History ==
In February 2012, the Ministry of Transport (now the Ministry of Construction) has decided to merge three enterprises including Airports Corporation of Northern, Central and Southern into Airports Corporation of Vietnam, abbreviated as ACV.

In October 2015, the equitisation plan of ACV was approved by the Prime Minister. In December 2015, ACV held an initial public offering (IPO). From April 2016, ACV officially operated as a joint stock company, changing its name to Airports Corporation of Vietnam - JSC.

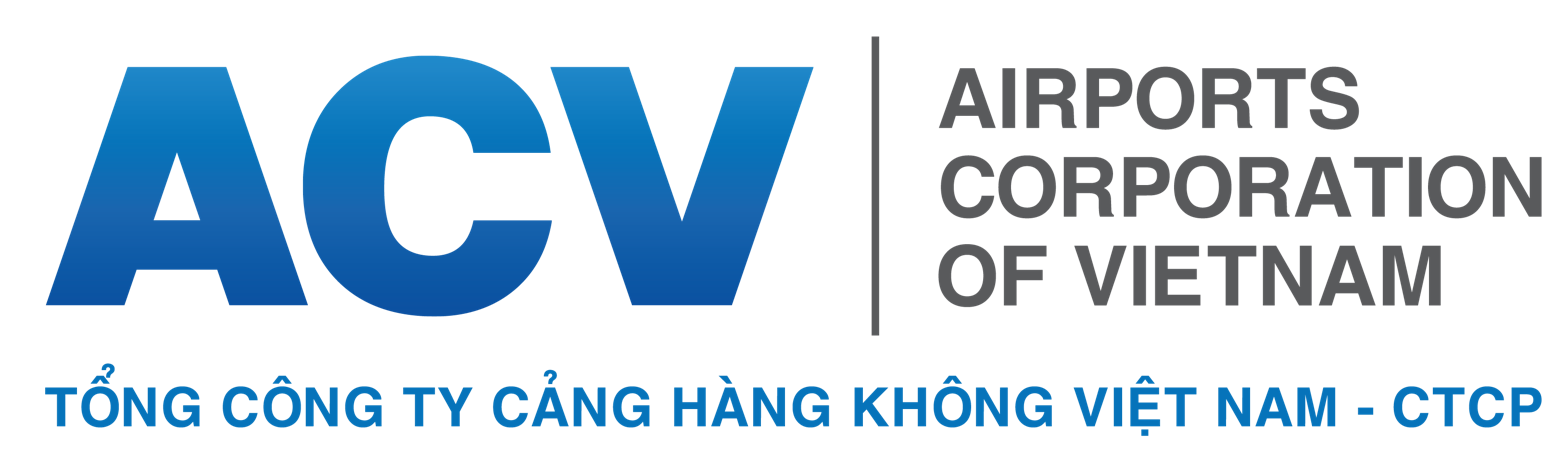
ACV former logo before 2024

== Divisions and subsidiaries ==
ACV is organized to the parent company - subsidiary model with 1 subsidiary and 11 associated companies with 22 airport branches in Vietnam, including 10 international airports and 12 domestic airports.

No.	Name	Location	Status
1	Tan Son Nhat International Airport	Tân Bình, Ho Chi Minh City	
2	Noi Bai International Airport	Nội Bài (Sóc Sơn), Hà Nội	
3	Da Nang International Airport	Hòa Cường (Hải Châu), Đà Nẵng	
4	Phu Quoc International Airport	Phú Quốc, An Giang	Ownership transferred to Sun Group in November 2025
5	Can Tho International Airport	Thới An Đông (Bình Thuỷ), Cần Thơ	
6	Phu Bai International Airport	Phú Bài (Hương Thuỷ), Huế	
7	Cam Ranh International Airport	North Cam Ranh, Khánh Hoà	
8	Vinh International Airport	Vinh Hưng (Vinh), Nghệ An	
9	Cat Bi International Airport	Hải An, Hải Phòng	
10	Lien Khuong International Airport	Đức Trọng, Lâm Đồng	
11	Buon Ma Thuot Airport	Tân Lập (Buôn Ma Thuột), Đắk Lắk	
12	Rach Gia Airport	Rạch Giá, An Giang	
13	Ca Mau Airport	Tân Thành (Cà Mau), Cà Mau	
14	Con Dao Airport	Côn Đảo, Ho Chi Minh CIty	
15	Tuy Hoa Airport	Phú Yên (Tuy Hoà), Đắk Lắk province	
16	Dien Bien Airport	Điện Biên Phủ, Điện Biên	
17	Nà Sản Airport	Chiềng Mung (Mai Sơn), Sơn La	Closed from 2004
18	Dong Hoi Airport	Đồng Thuận (Đồng Hới), Quảng Trị	
19	Chu Lai Airport	Núi Thành, Da Nang	
20	Pleiku Airport	Thống Nhất (Pleiku), Gia Lai	
21	Phu Cat Airport	Phù Cát (Quy Nhơn), Gia Lai	
22	Tho Xuan Airport	Sao Vàng (Thọ Xuân), Thanh Hoá	
