= Vietravel Airlines =

Airline of Vietnam

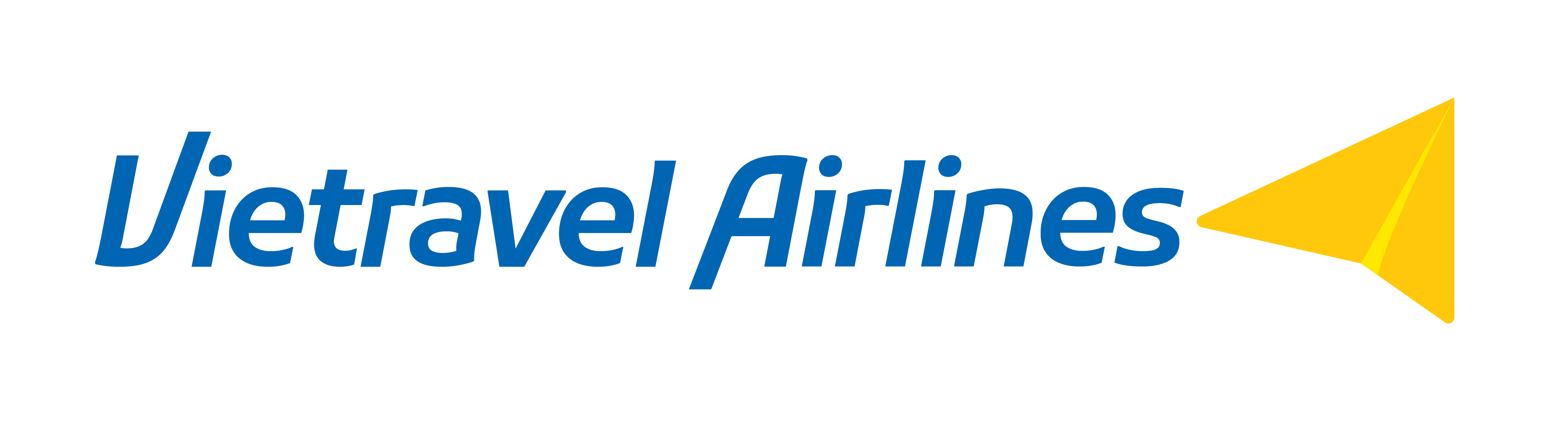

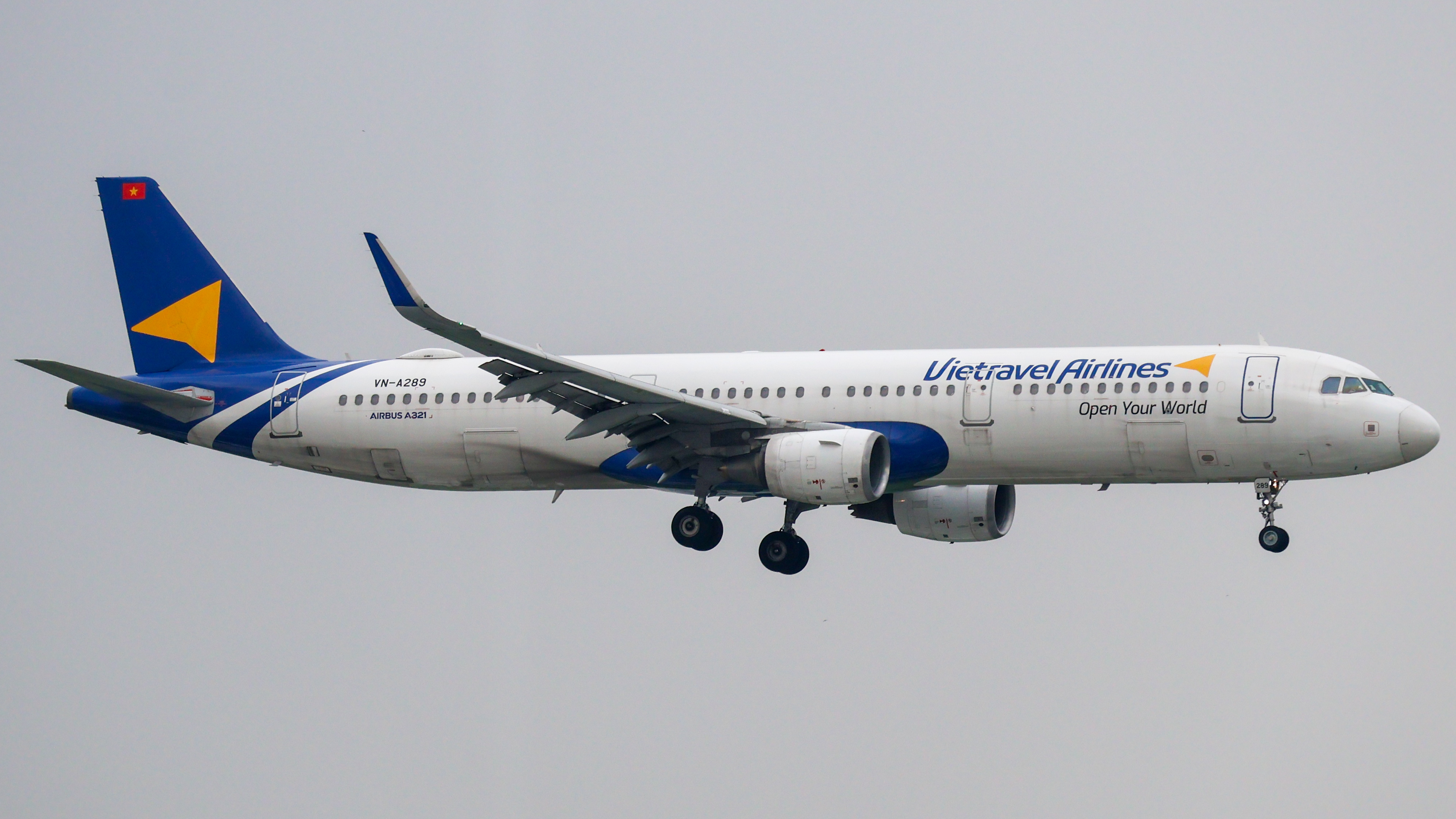
- Vietravel Airlines Airbus A321
IATA	ICAO	Call sign
VU	VAG	VIETRAVEL AIR
- Founded: February 12, 2019; 7 years ago
- Commenced operations: November 25, 2021; 4 years ago
- Operating bases: Hanoi; Ho Chi Minh City
- Fleet size: 3
- Parent company: T&T Group
- Headquarters: City of Huế
- Key people: Nguyen Quoc Ky (Chairman); Dao Duc Vu (CEO)
- Founder: Vietravel Holdings
- Website: www.vietravelairlines.com

Viet Nam Travel Airlines JSC (Vietnamese: CTCP Hàng không Lữ hành Việt Nam), operating as Vietravel Airlines, is a Vietnamese airline initially owned by the Vietravel Holdings, registered in Huế, Central Vietnam. The airline received its first Airbus A321 aircraft on December 5, 2020 and had its first commercial flight on November 25, 2021. With its licence issued in 2020 by Prime Minister Nguyễn Xuân Phúc, Vietravel Airlines became the country's sixth airline following Vietnam Airlines, VietJet Air, Jetstar Pacific, VASCO and Bamboo Airways. From 2024, the T&T Group became the major shareholder of the airline.

== History ==
The airline was proposed in early 2018, and the dossiers were submitted to the Vietnamese relevant authorities for review. On April 3, 2020, the Prime Minister of Vietnam approved the establishment of the airline.

On October 29, 2020, Vietravel Airlines received the operation license from the Ministry of Transport. On December 24, 2020, Vietravel Airlines received the Aircraft Operator Certificate (AOC) from the Civil Aviation Administration of Vietnam and its first aircraft shortly after. On December 26, 2020, the airline launched its maiden flight between Hanoi - Hue - Ho Chi Minh City.

On January 3, 2021, the carrier has announced its first charter routes from Hanoi and Ho Chi Minh City to Khanh Hoa, Qui Nhon and Phu Quoc. On January 19, 2021, the airline started selling its first commercial tickets for scheduled flight between Hanoi and Ho Chi Minh City. Currently, Vietravel Airlines has operating and expanding its routes to more than 10 destinations in Vietnam including.

In late 2024, T&T Group - known for its role behind Hanoi FC - became the carrier's new "strategic shareholder", reportedly holding up to 75% of the company's shares. The new investors outlined major expansion plan for the carrier. In late 2025, Vietravel confirmed its plan to completely withdraw from the airline that it has founded, with potential AirAsia entrance is speculated, despite regulatory barriers.

== Destinations ==
As of October 2026, Vietravel Airlines flies (or has flown) the following destinations:

Country	City	Airport	Notes	Refs
China	Shenzhen	Shenzhen Bao'an International Airport		
South Korea	Daegu	Daegu International Airport	Charter	
Taiwan	Taipei	Taoyuan International Airport	Charter	
Thailand	Bangkok	Suvarnabhumi Airport		
Vietnam	Buôn Ma Thuột	Buon Ma Thuot Airport		
Vietnam	Da Lat	Lien Khuong International Airport		
Vietnam	Da Nang	Da Nang International Airport		
Vietnam	Haiphong	Cat Bi International Airport		
Vietnam	Hanoi	Noi Bai International Airport	Base	
Vietnam	Ho Chi Minh City	Tan Son Nhat International Airport	Base	
Vietnam	Huế	Phu Bai International Airport	Terminated	
Vietnam	Nha Trang	Cam Ranh International Airport		
Vietnam	Phú Quốc	Phu Quoc International Airport	Charter	
Vietnam	Quy Nhon	Phu Cat Airport	Charter	
Vietnam	Thanh Hóa	Tho Xuan Airport		
Vietnam	Vinh	Vinh International Airport		

== Fleet ==
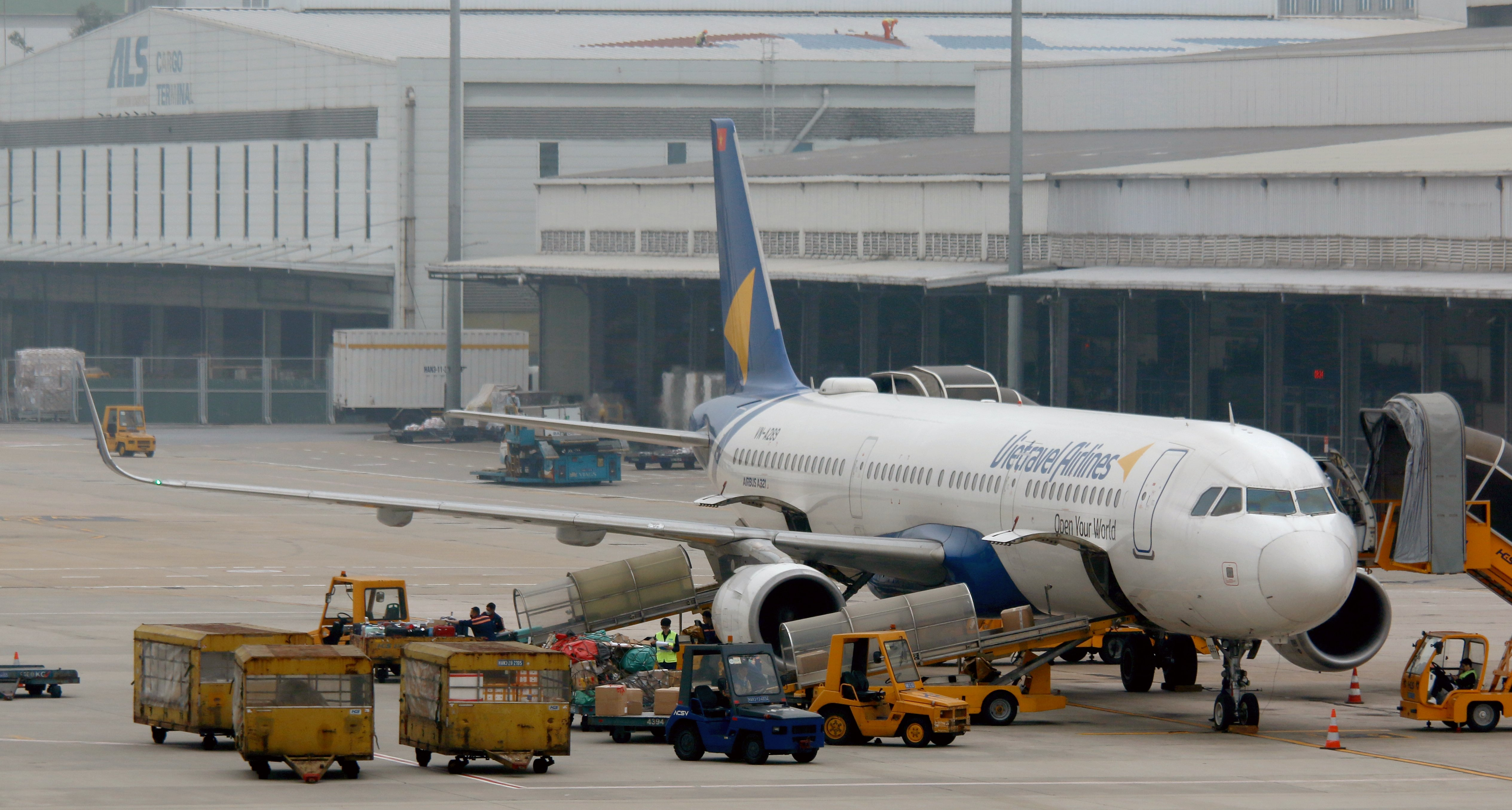
A Vietravel A321 operating at Noi Bai.

As of September 2026, Vietravel Airlines operates the following aircraft:

Vietravel Airlines fleet
Aircraft	In service	Orders	Passengers	Notes
Airbus A320-200	1	—	182	Former Spirit Airlines airframes.
Airbus A321-200	1	—	228	Former Spirit Airlines airframes.
Airbus A321-200	1	—	220	
Airbus A321-200	2	—	230	
Total	5	—		
