= PQC =

PQC may refer to:

- Post-quantum cryptography, in computing
- Phu Quoc International Airport (IATA code: PQC), Vietnam
- Paul Quinn College, Texas, US
