= VVPB =

VVPB may refer to:

- Vilniaus vertybinių popierių birža, NASDAQ OMX Vilnius
- Voter Verified Paper Audit Trail
- An ICAO airport code for Phu Bai International Airport, serving Huế, Vietnam
