= Phu Bai =

Phu Bai may refer to:

- Phu Bai Combat Base
- Phu Bai International Airport
