= Nhật Tân Bridge =

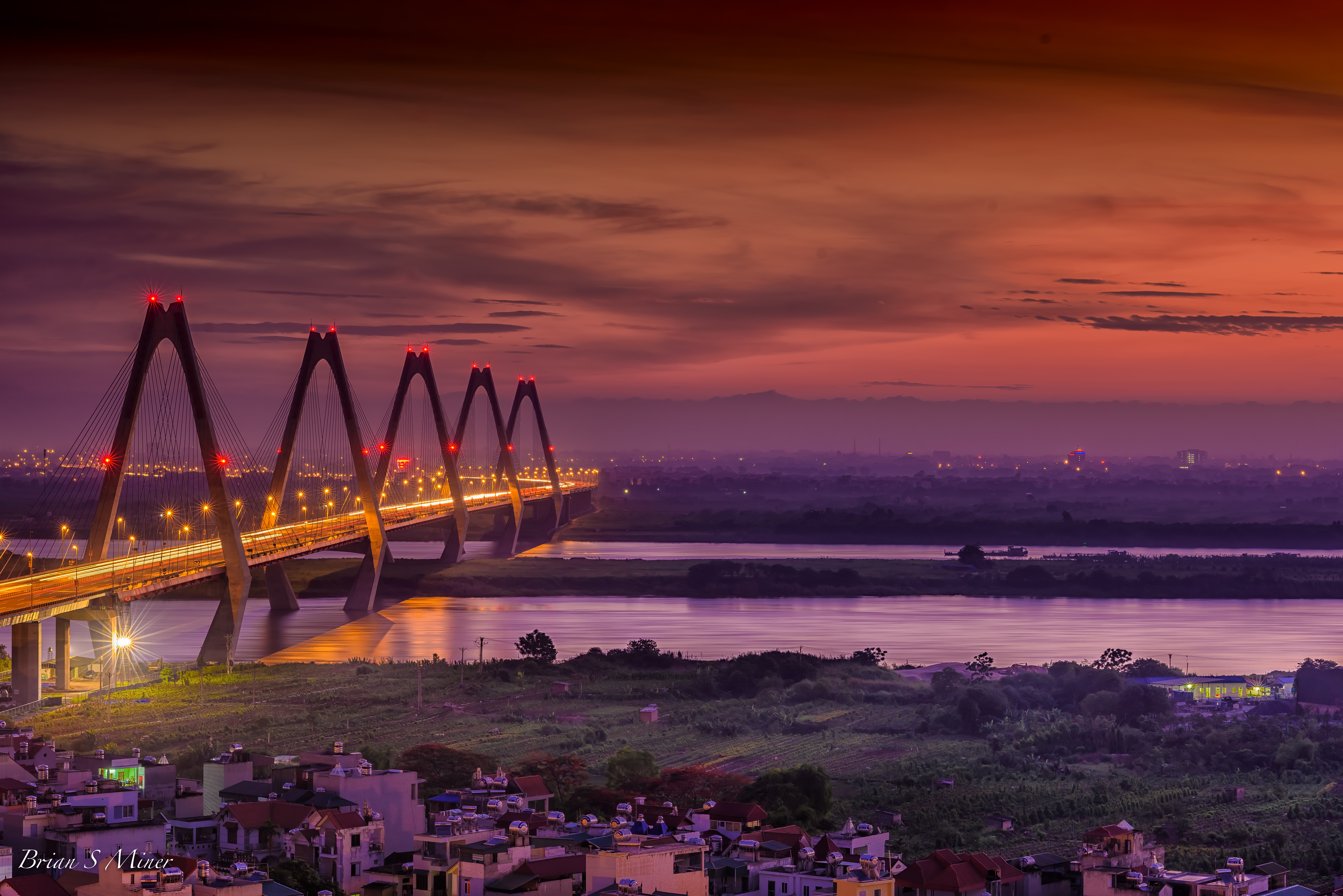
- Nhật Tân Bridge
- Coordinates: 21°05′34″N 105°49′15″E
- Crosses: Sông Hồng (Red River)
- Locale: Hanoi, Vietnam
- Other name: Vietnam – Japan Friendship Bridge

Characteristics
- Design: Cable-stayed bridge
- Total length: 3,700 metres (12,139 ft) (8,300 metres (27,231 ft) include approach ramps)
- Width: 33.2 metres (109 ft)
- Longest span: 4x300 metres (984 ft)

History
- Construction start: 7 March 2009
- Opened: 4 January 2015

Location
- Interactive map of Nhật Tân Bridge

The Nhật Tân Bridge (or Vietnam–Japan Friendship Bridge) is a cable-stayed bridge crossing the Red River in Hanoi, inaugurated on 4 January 2015. It forms part of a new six-lane highway linking Hanoi and Noi Bai International Airport. The project is funded by a Japan International Cooperation Agency ODA loan.

Nhat Tan Bridge has a total length of 8.3 kilometres (5.2 mi), including a 3.7 kilometres (2.3 mi) bridge, with 1.5 kilometres (0.93 mi) cable-stayed bridge with five spans crossing the Red River. The bridge is 33.2 metres (109 ft) wide, divided into four lanes for motorized vehicles, two lanes for buses, two lanes for mixed vehicles and pedestrian paths. Each span has 11 pairs of cables.

== History and Construction ==
The Nhật Tân Bridge project began in March 2009 as part of the expansion of Hanoi’s Ring Road 2, aimed at improving connectivity between the city center and Noi Bai International Airport. The initiative was largely financed through a Japanese Official Development Assistance (ODA) loan from Japan International Cooperation Agency (JICA), with additional contributions from the Vietnamese government, totaling approximately VND 13.6 trillion (about US$551 million).

The contract for the main bridge (Package 1) was awarded to a joint venture comprising Japanese firms Chodai Co., Ltd.,[Nippon Engineering Consultants, IHI Infrastructure Systems, and Sumitomo Mitsui Construction, under the management of PMU 85 of the Vietnamese Ministry of Transport. Construction took place from July/October 2009 until December 2014, with the bridge officially opening on 4 January 2015, accompanied by the inauguration of Noi Bai’s Terminal T2 and its connecting six‑lane highway.

Engineers placed significant emphasis on advanced foundation and superstructure techniques. The bridge’s support towers are founded on steel‑pipe sheet‑pile (SPSP) well foundations, used here for the first time in Vietnam, providing both cofferdam function and structural support. The superstructure is a composite girder-cable-stayed system, including steel I‑girders and precast concrete deck slabs, with over 14,500 t of steel and 15,900 m³ of concrete.

The bridge is named after Nhat Tan village, a well-known village for its growing of peach blossoms, (now, a ward) of Hanoi situated at the southern end of the bridge.

== Technical Features ==
- Total bridge length: ~8.3 km
- Main cable-stayed length: 1.5 km
- Main span configuration: 150m + 4×300m + 150m
- Bridge width: 33.2 meters
- Towers: Five A-shaped pylons, each ~110 meters tall
- Traffic lanes: Six total – four vehicle lanes and two bus/mixed-use lanes
- Superstructure: Composite steel girder with precast concrete slab and cable-stayed system using New Parallel Wire Strand

The five A-shaped towers symbolize Hanoi's five ancient gates, giving the bridge both structural and cultural significance.

== Significance and Recognition ==
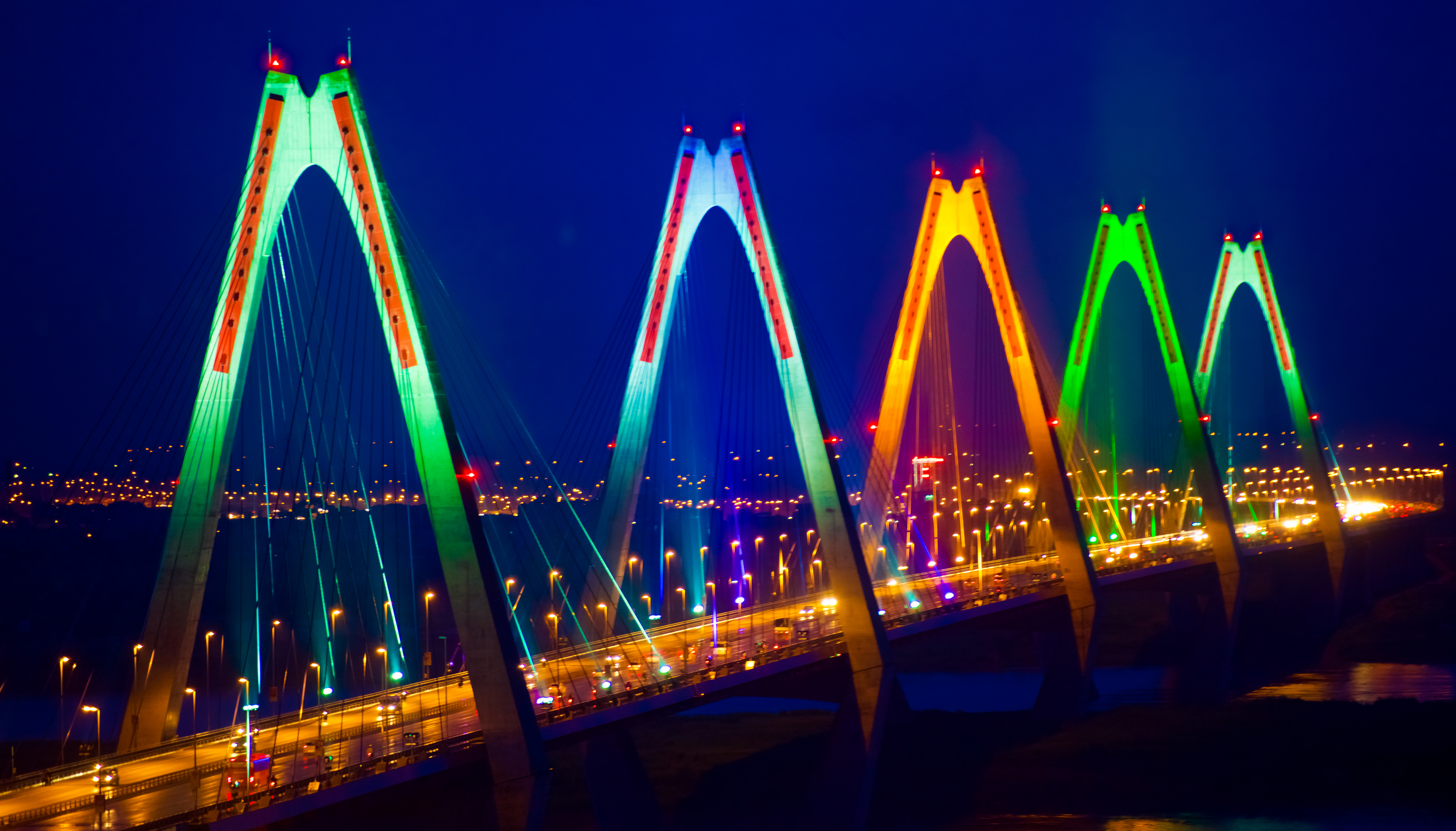
The bridge illuminated at night

When opened on 4 January 2015, the Nhật Tân Bridge became Vietnam’s longest steel cable-stayed bridge and is often considered Southeast Asia’s largest of its kind . It symbolizes both modern engineering prowess and the deep Vietnam–Japan friendship, earning dual names: Nhật Tân Bridge and Vietnam–Japan Friendship Bridge. Nhat Tan Bridge was designed and built to become a new icon of the capital, its five towers symbolizing the five ancient gates of Hanoi.

In 2017, Hanoi partnered with Philips (now Signify) to install a LED lighting system capable of displaying up to 16.7 million colors, transforming the bridge into a nightly visual spectacle . The structure now stands as both a functional transport link and an urban landmark.
