= Bamboo Airways =

Airline of Vietnam

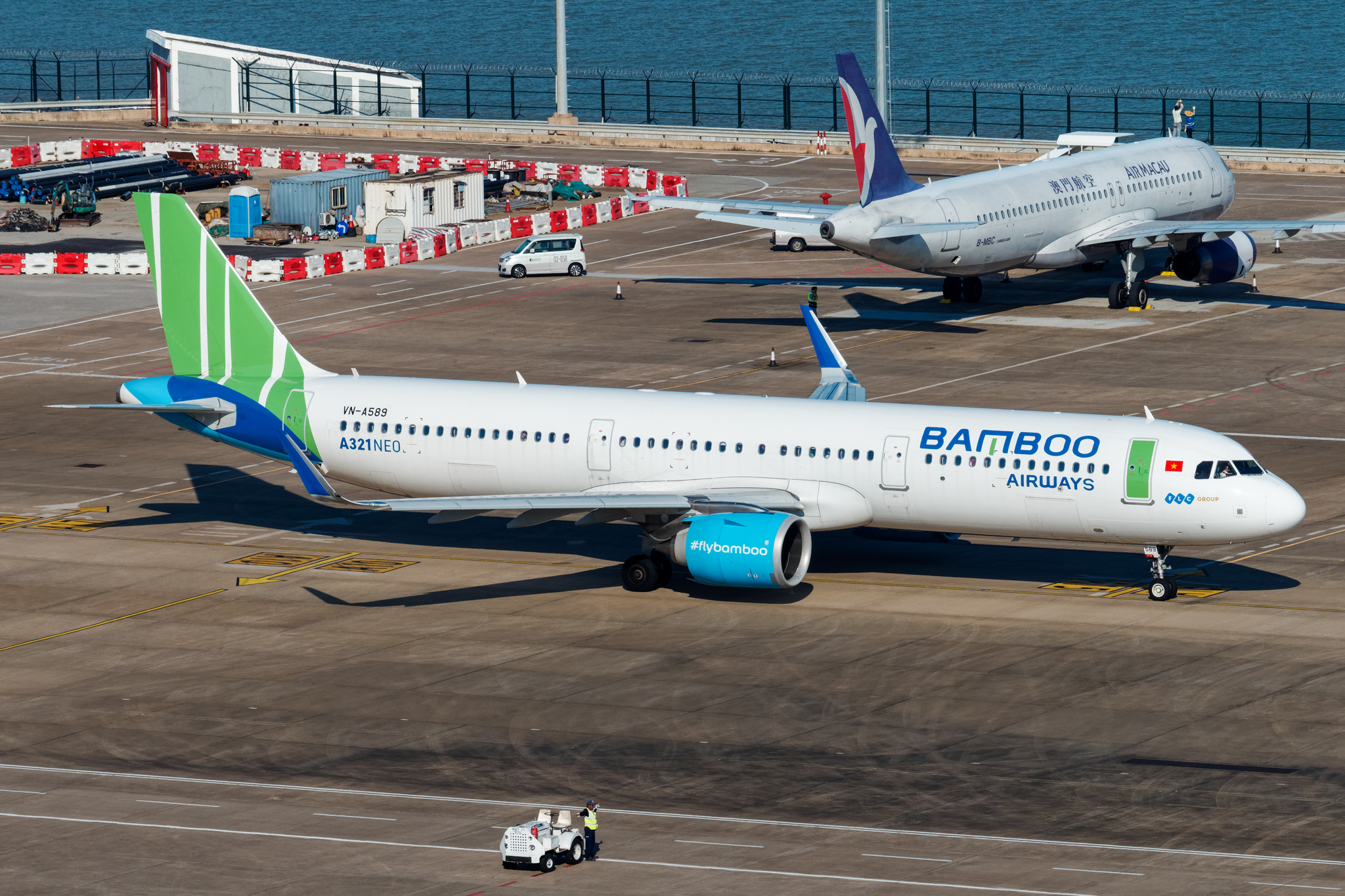
IATA	ICAO	Call sign
QH	BAV	BAMBOO
- Founded: 31 May 2017; 9 years ago
- Commenced operations: 16 January 2019; 7 years ago
- AOC #: 366
- Operating bases: Hanoi; Ho Chi Minh City; Quy Nhon
- Frequent-flyer program: Bamboo Club
- Fleet size: 1
- Destinations: 15
- Parent company: FLC Group
- Headquarters: Ho Chi Minh City, Vietnam
- Key people: Le Thai Sam (Chairman); Luong Hoai Nam (CEO)
- Founder: FLC Group
- Net income: −US$722.5 million (2022)
- Total assets: ▲US$ 1.4 billion (2020)
- Website: www.bambooairways.com

Bamboo Airways JSC (Vietnamese: CTCP Hàng không Tre Việt, lit. 'Viet Bamboo Aviation JSC') is a Vietnamese airline founded in 2017. Commencing operations in January 2019, this carrier declared that it would be following the "hybrid airline" model. Bamboo Airways operates a fleet of the narrowbody A320 Family aircraft, having hubs at Noi Bai International Airport and Tan Son Nhat International Airport alongside its registered base, Phu Cat Airport.

== History ==
=== Launching and aircraft acquisition ===
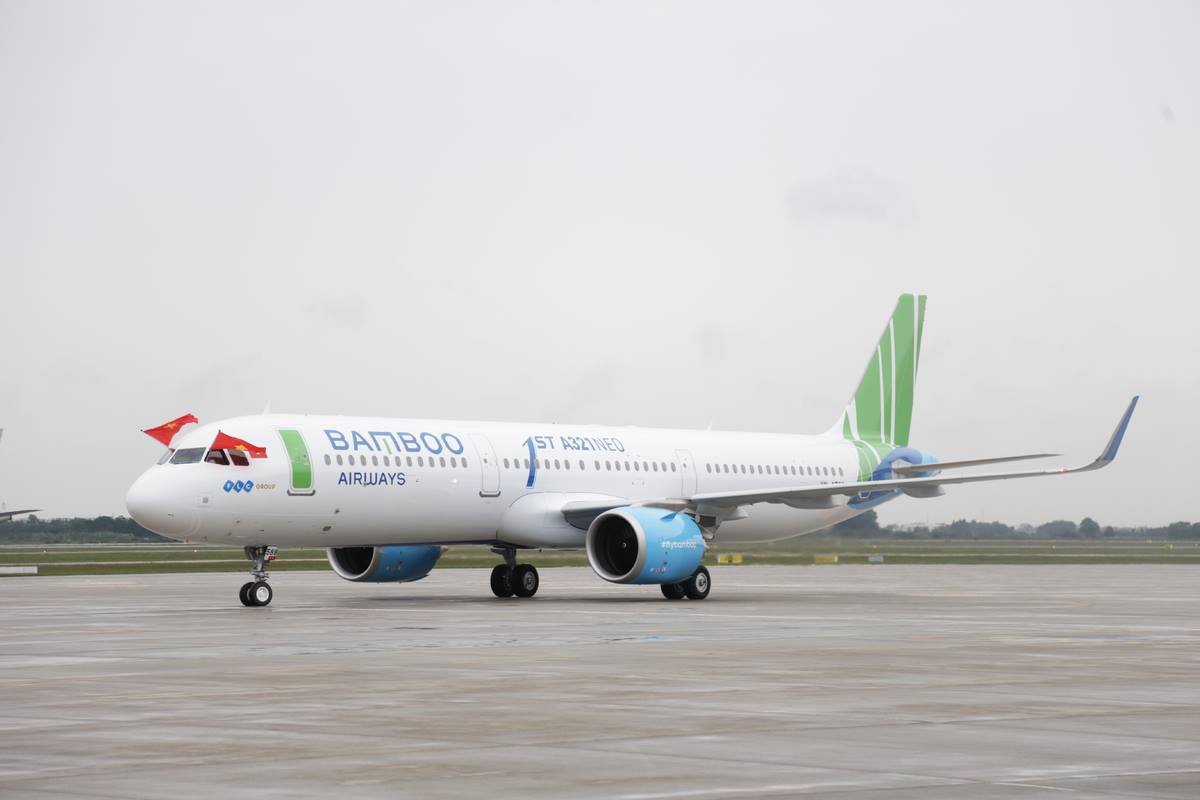
Bamboo Airways' first Airbus A321neo at Noi Bai International Airport. The type was phased in during November 2019 and was technically the first aircraft type to be commissioned by Bamboo Airways. The A321neo has since been phased out.

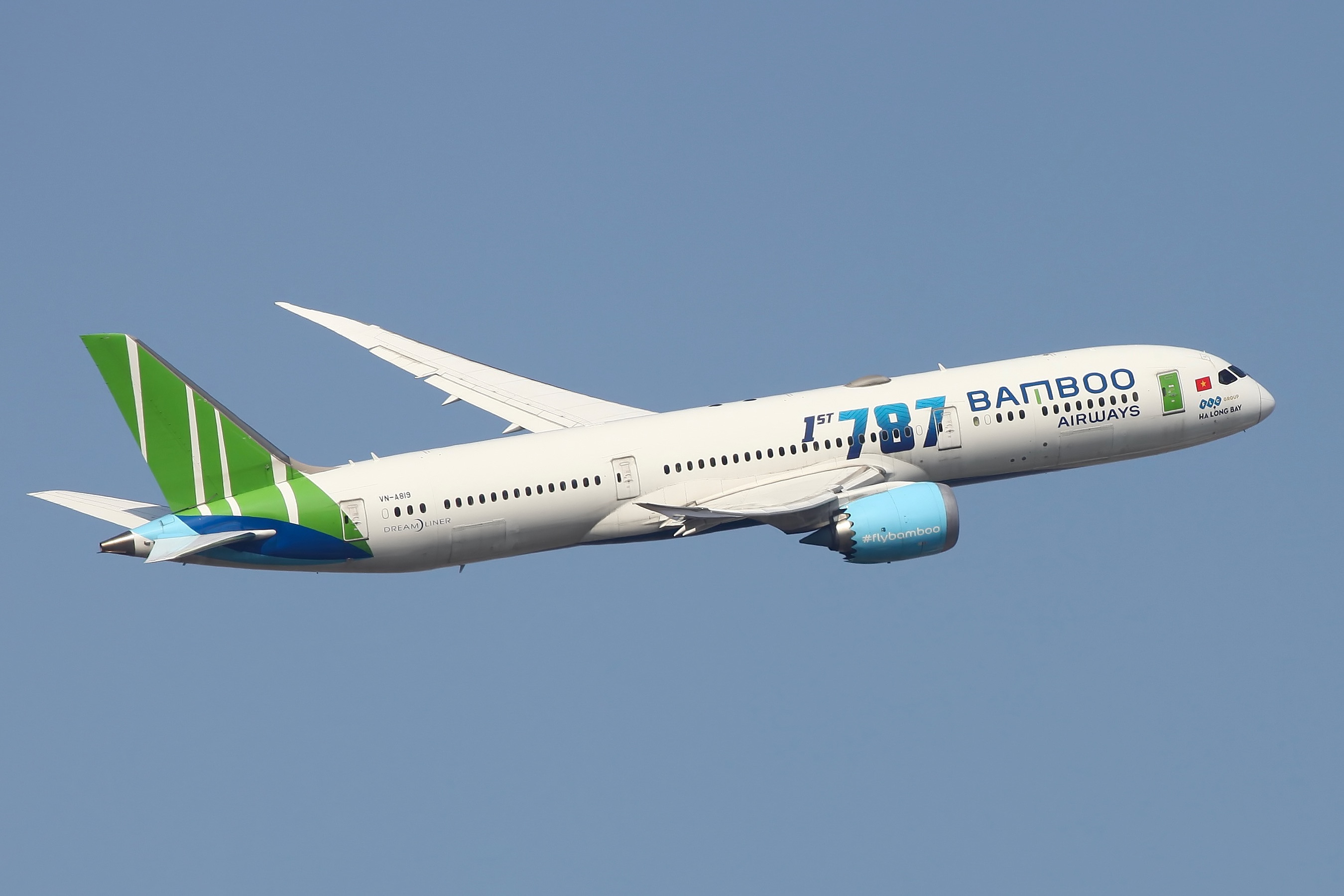
A former Bamboo Airways Boeing 787-9, which was operated until 2023

The airline was founded in 2017. In March 2018, a memorandum of understanding with Airbus for up to 24 Airbus A321neos in a deal worth up to US$3.1 billion was signed; the event was witnessed by the General Secretary Nguyễn Phú Trọng and the French Parliamentary President François de Rugy. On 25 June 2018, with the presence of Deputy Prime Minister Vương Đình Huệ, the FLC Group officially signed an agreement with Boeing for an order of 20 new Boeing 787-9 aircraft worth $5.6 billion.

In March 2019, Bamboo Airways completed an agreement to buy 26 more Airbus A321neo aircraft with a total listing value of up to $6.3 billion, serving the plan to develop the fleet and open new international routes, the agreement will bring the total number of narrow-body Airbus A321Neo aircraft ordered by Bamboo Airways to 50, including 24 in the memorandum of understanding signed in March 2018.

The airline aimed to hire up to 600 personnel when it began in April 2018 and additionally had goals to operate as a five-star airline. In July 2018, The FLC Group announced it would be increasing its charter capital to $56.52 million.

The establishment of the carrier was approved by the Prime Minister of Vietnam in July 2018. The airline's AOC was granted on 9 July 2018. Bamboo Airways subsequently passed the five stages for certification required by Vietnam's Civil Aviation Authority. After reviewing the airline's financial structure and business plan, the Ministry of Transport issued an aviation license in November 2018. The carrier inducted its first aircraft, an Airbus A319-100, in December 2018. The same month, Bamboo Airways took delivery of its first A321neo, on lease from GECAS.

The airline started operations using aircraft acquired by lease from third-party lessors, before taking delivery of aircraft from Airbus. Operations started on 16 January 2019, with a leased Airbus A320 linking Ho Chi Minh City with Hanoi. A firm order covering ten Boeing 787-9s was made public in early 2019. The carrier received its first A320neo in November 2019. The airline's first Boeing 787-9 was delivered a month later.

=== Founders' crisis, restructuring and new owner ===
In March 2022, Trịnh Văn Quyết – the founder and chairman of Bamboo Airways' then-parent group FLC – as well as many other of FLC's key people were arrested over alleged stock market manipulation, fraud and appropriation of properties. Concerned that the crisis would negatively affect the operations of the carrier and damage the rights and safety of the customers, the Civil Aviation Authority of Vietnam announced that it would closely monitor and supervise Bamboo Airways in a certain period of time, while Bamboo Airways declared that it faced little disruption and its business was still running "smoothly".

Followed by the authorities' investigations aiming at its parent company FLC Group, Bamboo Airways stated that it was in need of a "strategic investor". Local media reported that a new owner had already started its acquisition of Bamboo Airways by refreshing the board of directors of the enterprise, announcing restructure plans for Bamboo Airways as well as cutting connections between Bamboo Airways's operations and its "former" owner FLC Group.

The official website of Bamboo Airways no longer mentions the names of its founders, including the "FLC Group" brand. In the financial report of 2022's third quarter, FLC formally confirmed that its stake in Bamboo had been reduced to just more than 21%, eventually losing its dominant stakeholder position.

In March 2023, Bamboo Airways confirmed that it had found a group of new investors replacing Trịnh Văn Quyết and FLC's ownership in the company. Meanwhile, the first Bamboo aircraft was rolled out in Taiwan without "FLC Group" marking.

On 21 June 2023, Him Lam Group was officially announced as the new owner of Bamboo Airways. Shortly after the Him Lam takeover, there were allegations of Bamboo Airways filing for bankruptcy protection due to "the inability of the new investors." The carrier later refuted the rumours mentioned while committing that it would maintain all normal operations. It was subsequently recognized that Sacombank is looking to invest into the airline and help improving the financial situation of the carrier.

In October 2023, Bamboo appointed Luong Hoai Nam as the new CEO while announcing fleet restructuring, hinting that the carrier may decommission its widebody fleet. In 2026, the carrier expressed intention to maintain its Boeing 787 Dreamliner order and studying the Boeing 737 MAX.

== Corporate affairs ==
=== Key people ===
As of November 2018, Duong Thi Mai Hoa held the vice-president and general manager positions. Dang Tat Thang held the CEO position from 2018 until July 2022. Nguyen Manh Quan is the current CEO of the carrier, as of 30 July 2022.

Dang Tat Thang was also the chairman of the carrier after the former Chairman Trinh Van Quyet was arrested at the end of March 2022 on stock manipulation charges. He held the position and also the aforementioned CEO position until 27 July 2022, when he resigned, citing "personal reasons". After an extraordinary shareholders meeting on 13 August 2022, the carrier's shareholders have appointed Deputy Chairman Nguyen Ngoc Trong as the new chairman of the board for the carrier.

On 21 May, during a board meeting, the carrier's Board of Directors passed a Resolution appointing Mr Nguyen Minh Hai, former Deputy CEO of Vietnam Airlines and former CEO of Cambodia Angkor Air, to be the new CEO of the carrier from 24 May, replacing Mr Nguyen Manh Quan who has submitted a Resignation Letter to move up to the board of directors, only to resign after just 2 months. Currently, Le Thai Sam is acting as the carrier's Chairman of the Board, Le Ba Nguyen as the Vice Chairman and Nguyen Ngoc Trong as the CEO. The carrier has undergone a restructuring plan regarding its leadership, route network and fleet composition.

=== Ownership ===
Bamboo Airways was owned by FLC Group, a company that specializes in property development, finance, and mining, among other activities. FLC Group is reportedly transferring Bamboo Airways to another "strategic investor" and eventually withdrawing its influence from the carrier.

In 2023, following the founders' crisis, the carrier was practically acquired by Him Lam Group (Him Lam JSC) - a sizeable real estate investor in Vietnam - alongside a group of "Japanese-associated investors." In 2025, Bamboo Airways was returned to its founder FLC Group.

=== Headquarters ===
Bamboo Airways is headquartered in Cầu Giấy district, Hanoi. The transfer of Bamboo Airways' main offices from Hanoi to HCMC was finalized on 31 March 2024. The former headquarters in Hanoi has now been repurposed into a representative office, which has been relocated to Long Bien District.

== Destinations ==
As of February 2024, Bamboo Airways operates or has operated to the following destinations:

Country	City	Airport	Notes	Refs
Australia	Melbourne	Melbourne Airport	Terminated	
Australia	Sydney	Sydney Airport	Terminated	
China	Sanya	Sanya Phoenix International Airport	Charter	
China	Tianjin	Tianjin Binhai International Airport	Charter	
Germany	Frankfurt	Frankfurt Airport	Terminated	
Macau	Macau	Macau International Airport	Charter	
Japan	Fukushima	Fukushima Airport	Terminated	
Japan	Omitama	Ibaraki Airport	Charter	
Japan	Tokyo	Narita International Airport	Terminated	
Singapore	Singapore	Changi Airport	Terminated	
South Korea	Seoul	Incheon International Airport	Terminated	
Taiwan	Kaohsiung	Kaohsiung International Airport	Terminated	
Taiwan	Tainan	Tainan Airport	Charter	
Taiwan	Taipei	Taoyuan International Airport	Terminated	
Thailand	Bangkok	Don Mueang International Airport		
Thailand	Bangkok	Suvarnabhumi Airport	Terminated	
United Kingdom	London	Gatwick Airport	Terminated	
United Kingdom	London	Heathrow Airport	Terminated	
Vietnam	Buon Ma Thuot	Buon Ma Thuot Airport		
Vietnam	Can Tho	Can Tho International Airport		
Vietnam	Chu Lai	Chu Lai Airport		
Vietnam	Con Dao	Con Dao Airport		
Vietnam	Da Lat	Lien Khuong Airport		
Vietnam	Da Nang	Da Nang International Airport		
Vietnam	Đồng Hới	Dong Hoi Airport		
Vietnam	Ha Long	Van Don International Airport		
Vietnam	Hanoi	Noi Bai International Airport	Hub	
Vietnam	Hai Phong	Cat Bi International Airport		
Vietnam	Ho Chi Minh City	Tan Son Nhat International Airport	Hub	
Vietnam	Huế	Phu Bai International Airport		
Vietnam	Nha Trang	Cam Ranh International Airport		
Vietnam	Phu Quoc	Phu Quoc International Airport		
Vietnam	Pleiku	Pleiku Airport		
Vietnam	Quy Nhơn	Phu Cat Airport	Hub	
Vietnam	Rạch Giá	Rach Gia Airport		
Vietnam	Thanh Hóa	Tho Xuan Airport		
Vietnam	Tuy Hòa	Tuy Hoa Airport		
Vietnam	Vinh	Vinh International Airport		

=== Codeshare and Interline agreements ===
Bamboo Airways currently has Codeshare and interline agreements with the following airlines:

=== Codeshare ===
- Myanmar Airways International

=== Interline ===
- Air Canada

== Fleet ==
=== Current fleet ===
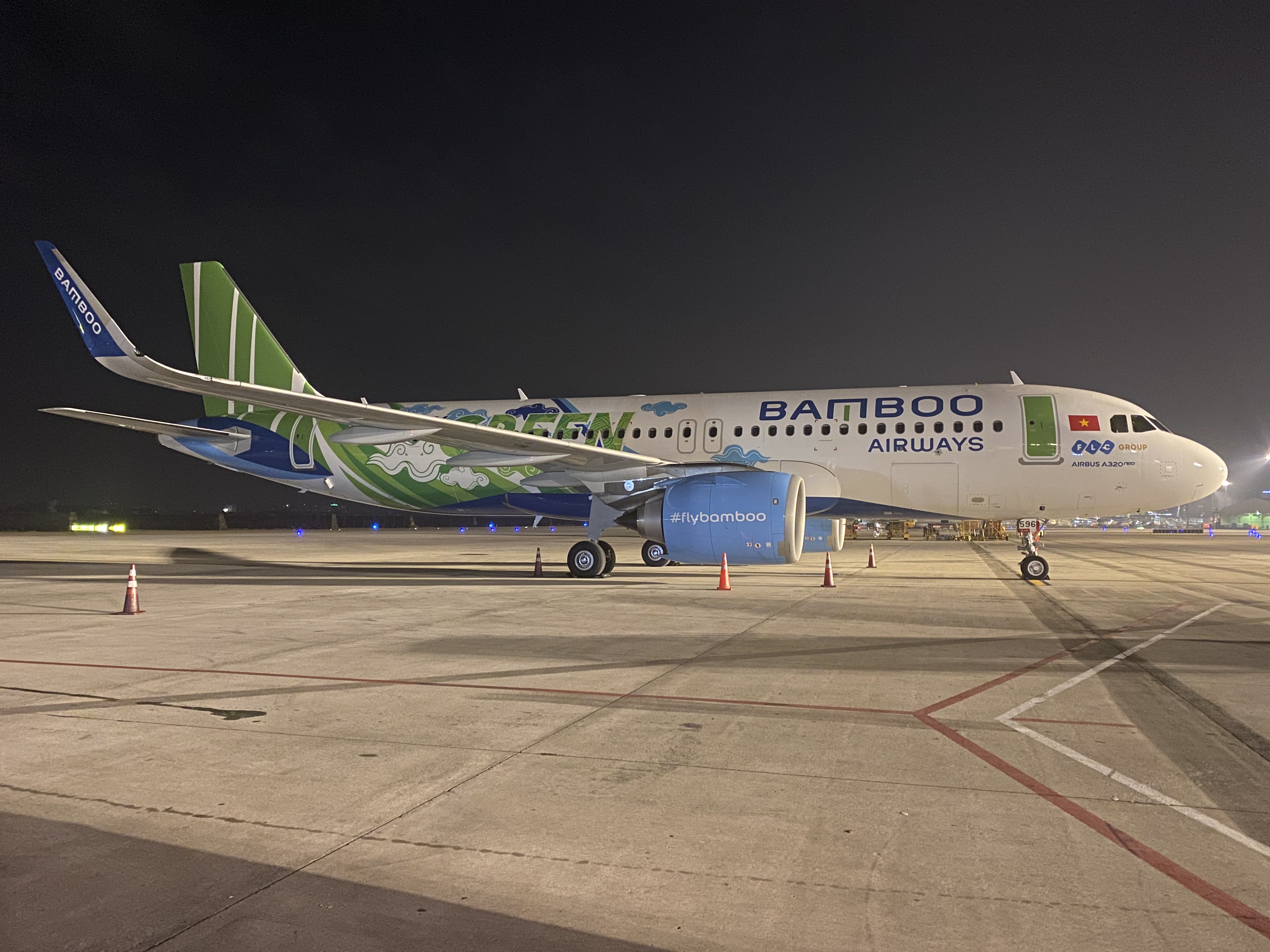
A former Bamboo Airways' A320neo aircraft with the Fly Green special livery spotted at Tan Son Nhat International Airport, Ho Chi Minh City

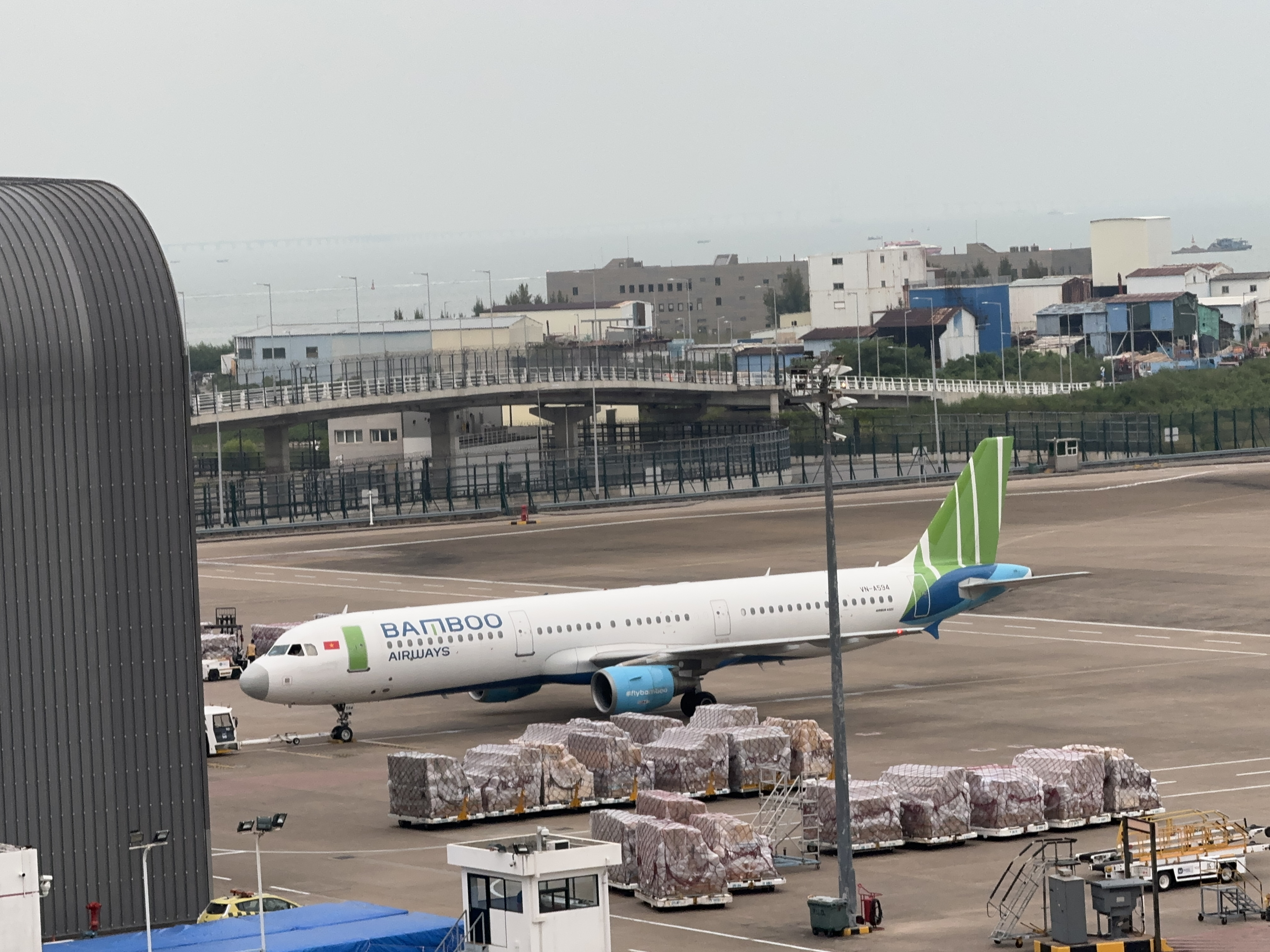
A Bamboo Airbus A321 at Macau International Airport.

As of August 2026, Bamboo Airways' operational fleet has been reduced to one aircraft amid restructuring:

Aircraft	In service	Orders	Passengers			Notes
Aircraft	In service	Orders	C	Y	Total	Notes
Airbus A321-200	1	—	8	184	192	
Total	1	—				

=== Fleet development ===
In August 2022, the then-Chairman Nguyen Ngoc Trong said that Bamboo Airways aimed to boost the number of aircraft in the fleet to 35 by the end of 2022, 42 in 2023 and 100 in 2028. Recently, the carrier has announced that it was undergoing a restructuring plan regarding its fleet in order to trim operating costs, thereby increasing operational effectiveness, increasing competition on the market and leading to a sustainable development.

=== Retired fleet ===
Those types of aircraft were either retired or decommissioned from Bamboo Airways fleet:

Aircraft	Introduced	Retired	Notes
Airbus A319-100	2019	2022	
Airbus A320-200	2019	2026	
Airbus A320neo	2019	2026	
Airbus A321neo	2018	2023	
Boeing 737-900ER	2025	2026	Wet leased from BBN Airlines Indonesia
Boeing 787-9	2019	2023	Two were transferred to Austrian Airlines.
Embraer E190	2021	2024	
Embraer E195	2020	2021	Wet leased from Great Dane Airlines and LOT Polish Airlines.

== See also ==
- Transport in Vietnam
