= Nam Cường =

Vietnamese singer and actor (born 1985)

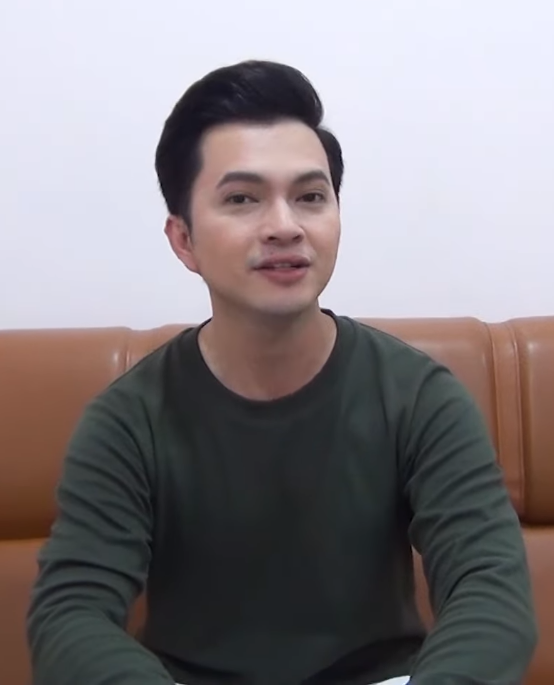
- Nam Cường in 2021
- Born: Nguyễn Nam Cường; September 16, 1985 (age 40); Da Nang, Vietnam
- Occupations: Singer; Actor; MC
- Notable work: Những thiên thần áo trắng

Nguyễn Nam Cường (born September 16, 1985), known professionally as Nam Cường, is a Vietnamese singer, actor, and television presenter. He first gained public attention as a winning contestant on the 2003 reality show "Yo! Cùng ước mơ xanh," which led to his inclusion in the boy band Yoband!. He later embarked on a successful solo career.

== Career ==
In 2003, Nam Cường won the "Yo! Cùng ước mơ xanh" competition, becoming a member of the resulting pop group Yoband! alongside Minh Thư, Tóc Tiên, and Viết Thanh. The group enjoyed a period of popularity with songs like "Tình Ca" but disbanded after their contractual obligations ended, with members pursuing solo careers.

Nam Cường officially launched his solo career with the album "Đồng Thoại" on October 7, 2008, a collaboration with musician Tăng Nhật Tuệ. The title track had previously won an audience choice award at the Bài Hát Việt (Vietnamese Song) program in 2007. His duet with Tóc Tiên, "Không có bài tình ca cuối," also received an award from the artistic council at the same event.

His major breakthrough came with the song "Bay giữa ngân hà," composed by Nguyễn Văn Chung, from his second album of the same name. The ballad became a significant hit, establishing him as a popular singer. Nam Cường continued his success through collaborations with musician Khắc Việt, releasing a string of popular songs including "Khó" (which garnered over 20 million listens on Zing MP3), "Đoạn cuối con đường," "Phải là anh," and "Hết." Beyond his singing career, Nam Cường has also worked as an actor in various television dramas and films, and as an MC for events and television programs.

== Personal life ==
Nam Cường married Phương Thảo, a banking officer, in March 2016. The couple has children. He tends to keep his family life private.
