= Đức Trọng =

- Commune
- Phương Liên Tịnh Xứ Pongour Waterfall
- Interactive map of Đức Trọng
- Coordinates: 11.735644538936883°N 108.37348025647093°E
- Country: Vietnam
- Region: South Central Coast and Central Highlands
- Province: Lâm Đồng
- Established: 31 December 2024
- Administrative headquarters: National Route 20

Area
  - Total: 148.78 km^{2} (57.44 sq mi)

Population (31 December 2024)
  - Total: 85,163
  - Density: 572/km^{2} (1,480/sq mi)

Đức Trọng is a commune in Lâm Đồng province, Vietnam.

On 16 June 2025, the Standing Committee of the National Assembly of Vietnam issued Resolution No. 1671/NQ-UBTVQH15 on the arrangement of commune-level administrative units in Lâm Đồng province in 2025. Under the resolution, the entire area and population of Liên Nghĩa township and Phú Hội commune, formerly part of Đức Trọng district, were merged to form a new commune named Đức Trọng.
