= Rach Gia Airport =

Airport in Vietnam

Rach Gia Airport Sân bay Rạch Giá
- IATA: VKG; ICAO: VVRG

Summary
- Airport type: Public
- Operator: Southern Airports Services Company
- Serves: Rạch Giá, Hà Tiên, Châu Đốc and Long Xuyên
- Location: Rạch Giá, An Giang Province
- Elevation AMSL: 7 ft (2.1 m)
- Coordinates: 9°57′35″N 105°8′2″E
- Website: rachgiaairport.net

Map
- Location of airport in Vietnam

Runways
Direction	Length		Surface
Direction	m	ft	Surface
08/26	1,500	4,921	Asphalt

Rach Gia Airport (IATA: VKG, ICAO: VVRG) is an airport located in Rạch Giá, Vietnam. The airport was built in the 1950s by the French. Its original purpose was to connect Saigon to the Southwestern portion of Vietnam.

== Airlines and destinations ==
Airlines	Destinations
Bamboo Airways	Hanoi, Ho Chi Minh City

== See also ==
- List of airports in Vietnam
