= Cat Bi International Airport =

Airport serving Hai Phong, Vietnam

Cat Bi International Airport Sân bay Quốc tế Cát Bi Cảng hàng không quốc tế Cát Bi
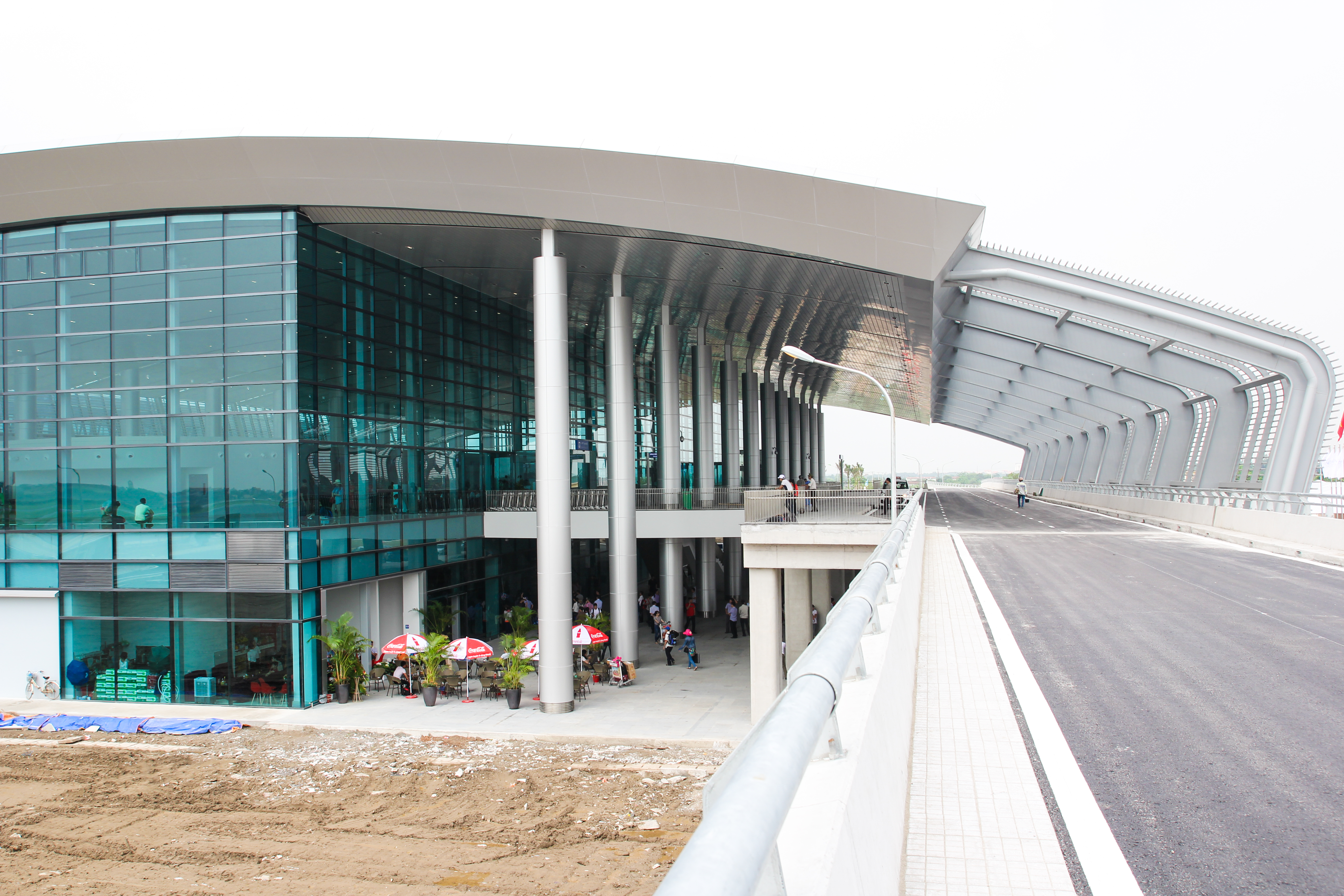
- IATA: HPH; ICAO: VVCI

Summary
- Airport type: Public
- Operator: Northern Airports Services Company
- Serves: Hai Phong
- Location: Hai Phong, Vietnam
- Operating base for: VietJet Air
- Elevation AMSL: 4 m (13 ft)
- Coordinates: 20°49′09″N 106°43′29″E
- Website: acv.vn/vi/hph

Map
- Location of airport in Vietnam

Runways
Direction	Length		Surface
Direction	m	ft	Surface
07/25	3,050	10,007	Asphalt

Statistics (2018)
- Total passenger: 2,737,700
- Aircraft movements: 14,374
- Airfreight (tonnes): 17,128
- Hai Phong Portal

Cat Bi International Airport (IATA: HPH, ICAO: VVCI) is an international airport serving Hai Phong, the third largest city in Vietnam.

== History ==
=== First Indochina War ===
During the war Cat Bi Air Base was used by French Air Force (Armée de l'air), units based there included:

- Group de Chasse 2/22 Languedoc equipped with the F8F Bearcat
- Bomber Squadron 1/19 Gascogne equipped with the B-26 Invader
- Bomber Squadron 1/25 Tunisie equipped with the B-26

The base was also used by French Naval Aviation (Aéronavale), units based there included:

- Flotille 28F equipped with the PB4Y-2 Privateer
- the air groups of the Arromanches and Bois Belleau

On 14 November 1953 the United States Air Force 483d Troop Carrier Wing flew five C–119s from Clark Air Base to Cat Bi to qualify French Air Force crews on them. In December 1953 in order to support C–119s, the USAF deployed to Cat Bi detachments of the 483d Troop Carrier Wing, the 8081st Aerial Resupply Unit and a provisional maintenance squadron of the Far East Air Logistics Force in what was known as Operation Cat Paw which had a peak strength in April 1954 of 121 men.

On the night of 6/7 March 1954 the Viet Minh attacked the base destroying 1 B-26 and 6 Morane-Saulnier MS.500 Criquets.

On 9 March 1954 civilian pilots from the CIA-backed Civil Air Transport (CAT) arrived at Cat Bi to begin flying C-119s, they began flying cargo missions on 12 March. Cat Bi-based CAT aircraft flew a total of 682 missions in support of the Battle of Dien Bien Phu between 13 March and 6 May 1954.

On 22 May 1954 the 483d Troop Carrier Wing maintenance detachment at Cat Bi relocated to Tourane Air Base.

=== Vietnam War ===
During the war, the base was used by the Vietnam People's Air Force. On 9 January and 10 February 1968, United States jets attacked the base.

On 26 August 1972, during Operation Linebacker, U.S. Navy jets bombed the base.

In early 1973 U.S. C-130 aircraft flew into Cat Bi to deliver minesweeping equipment as part of Operation End Sweep.

== Expansion ==
Vietnam has announced a new master plan to upgrade the airport with a 3,050-meter second runway, a new terminal, and a new apron by 2015. The existing runway will also be upgraded. After the expansion, the airport will be capable of serving up to 4–5 million passengers a year.

The first phase of the project was completed in May 2016, giving this airport a capacity of 2 million passengers per year. The new terminal and new runway were opened on 12 May 2016. The airport can serve the Boeing 767, Airbus A350 XWB and similar aircraft.

== Technical Specifications ==
- Current Airport Level: Rated as a 4E airport per ICAO standards.
- Current Firefighting Level: Rated at level 6 by ICAO.
- Runway Length: 3,050 meters, equipped for night flights.
- Runway Width: Main runway is 45 meters wide.
- Taxiway Size: Main taxiway measures 2,400 x 23 meters.
- Runway Structure: Cement concrete and asphalt.
- Aircraft Stands: 10 positions for Airbus A320-321.
- Capacity: 1,000 passengers per peak hour, serving 2-4 million passengers annually.
- Passenger Terminal: 15,630m² area with two levels and 29 check-in counters (domestic: counters 1-16; international: counters 17-29).
- Boarding Gates: 6 gates (2 with jet bridges, 4 by bus).
- Baggage Carousels: 3 (2 for domestic, 1 for international).
- Aircraft Capacity: Can accommodate large aircraft like Boeing 777, 767, 787, 737-400, and Airbus models A330, A350, A320-321, among others.
- Navigation and Landing Aids: Equipped with ILS CAT II, VOR/DME systems.

== Air Traffic Control Tower ==
Construction began on December 11, 2014, and the tower became operational on January 6, 2016. Funded by the Vietnam Air Traffic Management Corporation with an investment of 80 billion VND, the project aimed to build a 42.9-meter-high control tower with modern, synchronized facilities. It can manage 30 takeoff and landing operations per hour, reducing cloud ceiling requirements from 180m to 80m and visibility from 2,800m to 800m, ensuring continuous flight operations at the airport.

== Statistics ==
Year	Number of passengers
2005	94.432
2006	
2007	185.953
2008	
2009	377.728
2010	491.046
2011	631.096
2013	872.800
2014	930.110
2015	1.256.719
2016	1.787.300
2017	2.057.840
2018	2.310.148
2023	2.705.000

== Airlines and destinations ==
Airlines	Destinations
Bamboo Airways	Buon Ma Thuot, Can Tho, Con Dao, Da Nang, Ho Chi Minh City, Nha Trang, Pleiku, Quy Nhon
GX Airlines	Nanning
Lucky Air	Lijiang
Pacific Airlines	Ho Chi Minh City
Qingdao Airlines	Chengdu–Tianfu
Ruili Airlines	Kunming
Shenzhen Airlines	Guangzhou, Shenzhen
Sun PhuQuoc Airways	Ho Chi Minh City, Phu Quoc
VietJet Air	Buon Ma Thuot, Can Tho, Da Lat, Da Nang, Ho Chi Minh City, Nha Trang, Phu Quoc, Pleiku, Quy Nhon,
Vietnam Airlines	Da Lat, Ho Chi Minh City
Vietravel Airlines	Ho Chi Minh City

== See also ==
- List of airports in Vietnam

== Notes ==
- Cat Bi International Airport became an international airport from 00:01 of 11 May 2016.
- Ready for new international flight to Guangzhou, China at the end of April
