= Noi Bai International Airport =

Commercial airport serving Hanoi, Vietnam

Noi Bai International Airport Sân bay quốc tế Nội Bài Cảng hàng không quốc tế Nội Bài

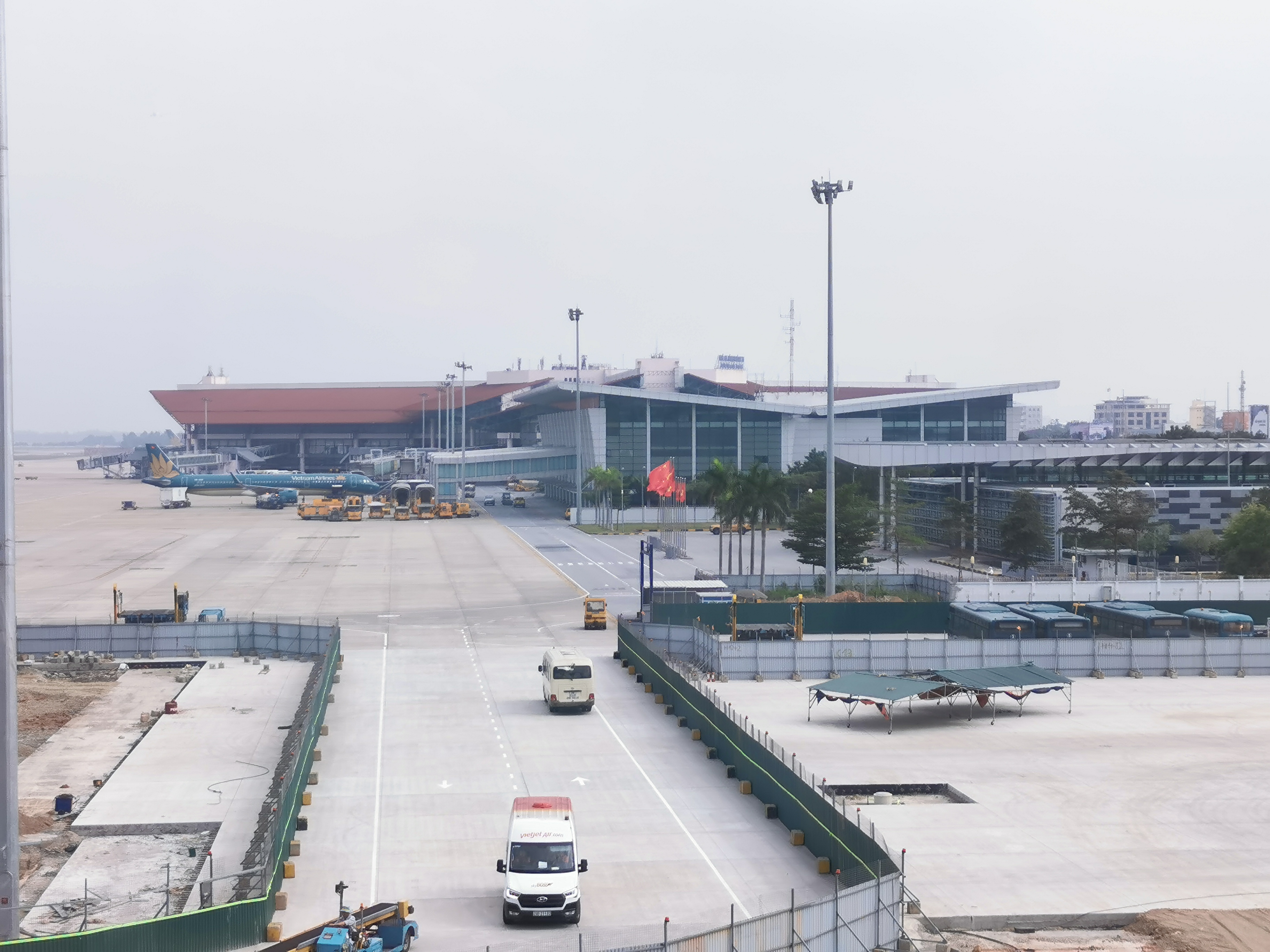
- IATA: HAN; ICAO: VVNB; WMO: 48820

Summary
- Airport type: Public / military
- Owner/Operator: Airports Corporation of Vietnam
- Serves: Hanoi metropolitan area
- Location: Nội Bài Commune, Hanoi, Vietnam
- Opened: 2 January 1978; 48 years ago
- Hub for: Vietnam Airlines
- Operating base for: Bamboo Airways; VietJet Air; Vietravel Airlines
- Elevation AMSL: 12 m (39 ft)
- Coordinates: 21°12′50″N 105°48′11″E
- Website: noibaiairport.vn/en

Map
- Location of airport in Hanoi HAN/VVNB (Vietnam)

Runways
Direction	Length		Surface
Direction	ft	m	Surface
11L/29R	10,497	3,200	Concrete
11R/29L	12,466	3,800	Concrete

Statistics (2019)
- Total passengers: 29,304,631 ▲13.1%
- Source: Taseco Airs

Nội Bài International Airport (IATA: HAN, ICAO: VVNB) is an international airport serving Hanoi, the capital of Vietnam. It is the second busiest airport in Vietnam by passenger traffic, after Tan Son Nhat International Airport in Ho Chi Minh City. It is currently the main airport serving Hanoi, replacing the role of Gia Lam Airport.

The airport consists of two passenger terminals and a cargo terminal. Terminal 1 serves domestic flights, and Terminal 2 (inaugurated on 4 January 2015) serves all international flights to and from Hanoi. The airport is currently the main hub of the flag carrier Vietnam Airlines, travel carrier Vietravel Airlines, and an operating base of budget carriers Bamboo Airways and VietJet Air.

The airport is located in Phú Minh commune in Sóc Sơn district (now Nội Bài commune), about 35 km (22 mi) northeast of downtown Hanoi, via the new Nhật Tân Bridge (also inaugurated on 4 January 2015). It can also be reached by National Road 3, which connects it with the eastern suburbs of Hanoi. The airport is also close to some satellite cities of Hanoi such as Vĩnh Yên, Bắc Ninh and Thái Nguyên. The airport served a total of 13 million passengers in 2013, despite having a capacity of only 9 million at the time. The new international terminal, which had its first commercial flight on 25 December 2014 and went into full operation on 31 December 2014, has boosted the airport's total capacity to 20 million passengers per year. In 2018, the airport served 28 million passengers.

Of the routes the airport offers, the Hanoi – Ho Chi Minh City route is the busiest flight in Southeast Asia and the fourth busiest in the world, serving 10,883,555 customers in 2023, an increase of 3% in comparison to 2022.

== History ==
The airport was developed immediately south of the Phúc Yên Air Base and opened on 2 January 1978. As of 1983, the only carriers at the airport were Aeroflot, CSA, Hang Khong Vietnam, Interflug, Lao Aviation, and Thai Airways.

Handling these flights were a set of three small buildings: Terminal G2 (Vietnamese: Ga 2 - Ga Quốc tế đi) for international departures, Terminal G3 (Vietnamese: Ga 3 - Ga hàng không đường bay trong nước) for domestic departures and arrivals, and Terminal G4 (Vietnamese: Ga 4 - Ga Quốc tế đến) for international arrivals. These terminals were continuously renovated to handle the increasing number of flights. However, in the end they were too small for the actual need, and the new terminal was built and was completed to operate in 2001. The old terminals were then demolished to make place for the current cargo terminal.

The airport has been a SkyTeam hub since mid-2010, after Vietnam Airlines joined the network that year.

== Terminals and facilities ==
At 650 hectares, Noi Bai is the second-largest airport in Vietnam, behind the 800 hectare Tan Son Nhat International Airport. Terminal 1, completed in 2001, used to be the sole terminal handling both domestic and international flights. However, with the opening of the second terminal, it is now reassigned to handle domestic flights only. The terminal saw its first extension in 2013 with the inauguration of the new lobby E, and was capable of handling 9 million passengers per annum. The terminal has been being upgraded to handle 15 million passengers annually by March 2018.

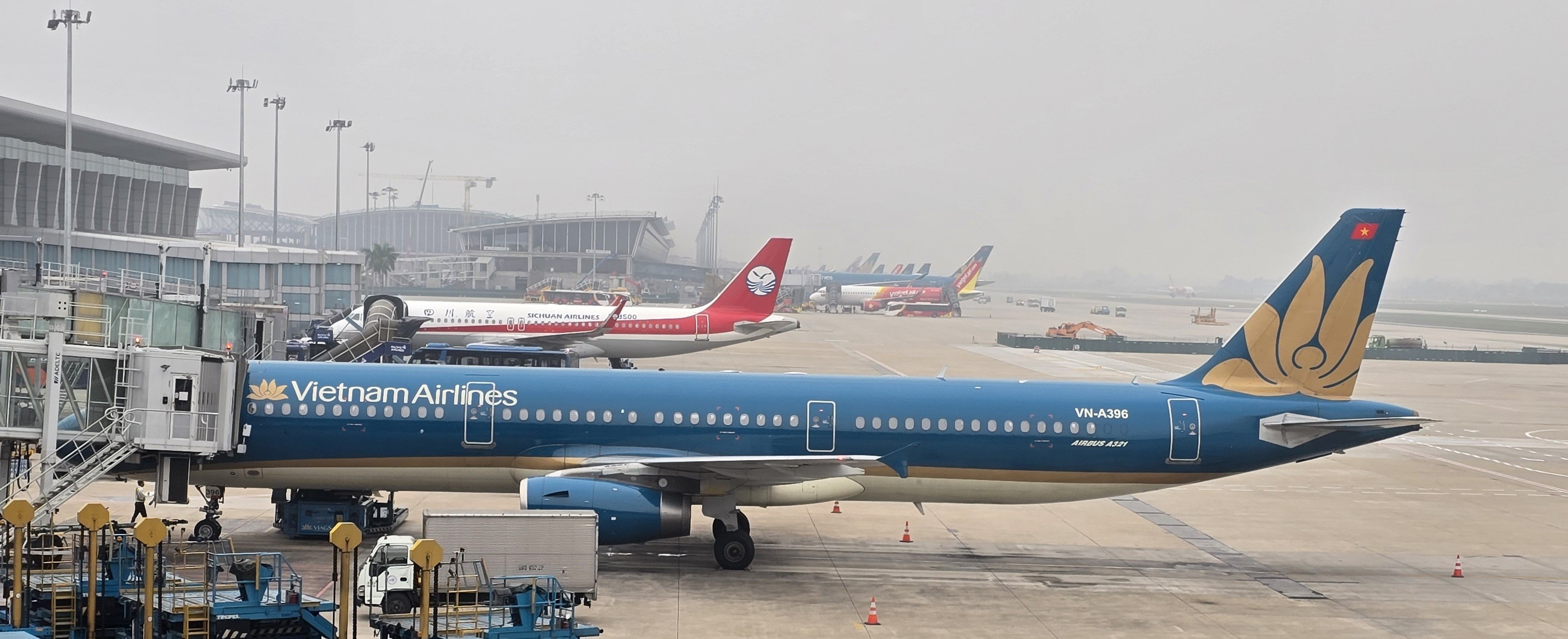
The airport's tarmac in 2025.

The construction of the new terminal (Terminal 2) next to the existing one with a designed capacity of 10 million passengers per annum started in March 2012. The 996 m long new terminal building, funded by a Japan International Cooperation Agency ODA loan was designed by Japan Airport Consultants and was built by Taisei Corporation. The total investment for the project was ¥75.5 billion (US$645.35 million). Japan's official development assistance accounted for ¥59 billion ($504.27 million) of the investment, while the remaining amount was covered by local funds. The new international terminal was inaugurated on 4 January 2015 together with a new freeway connecting the airport to downtown Hanoi via the Nhật Tân Bridge.

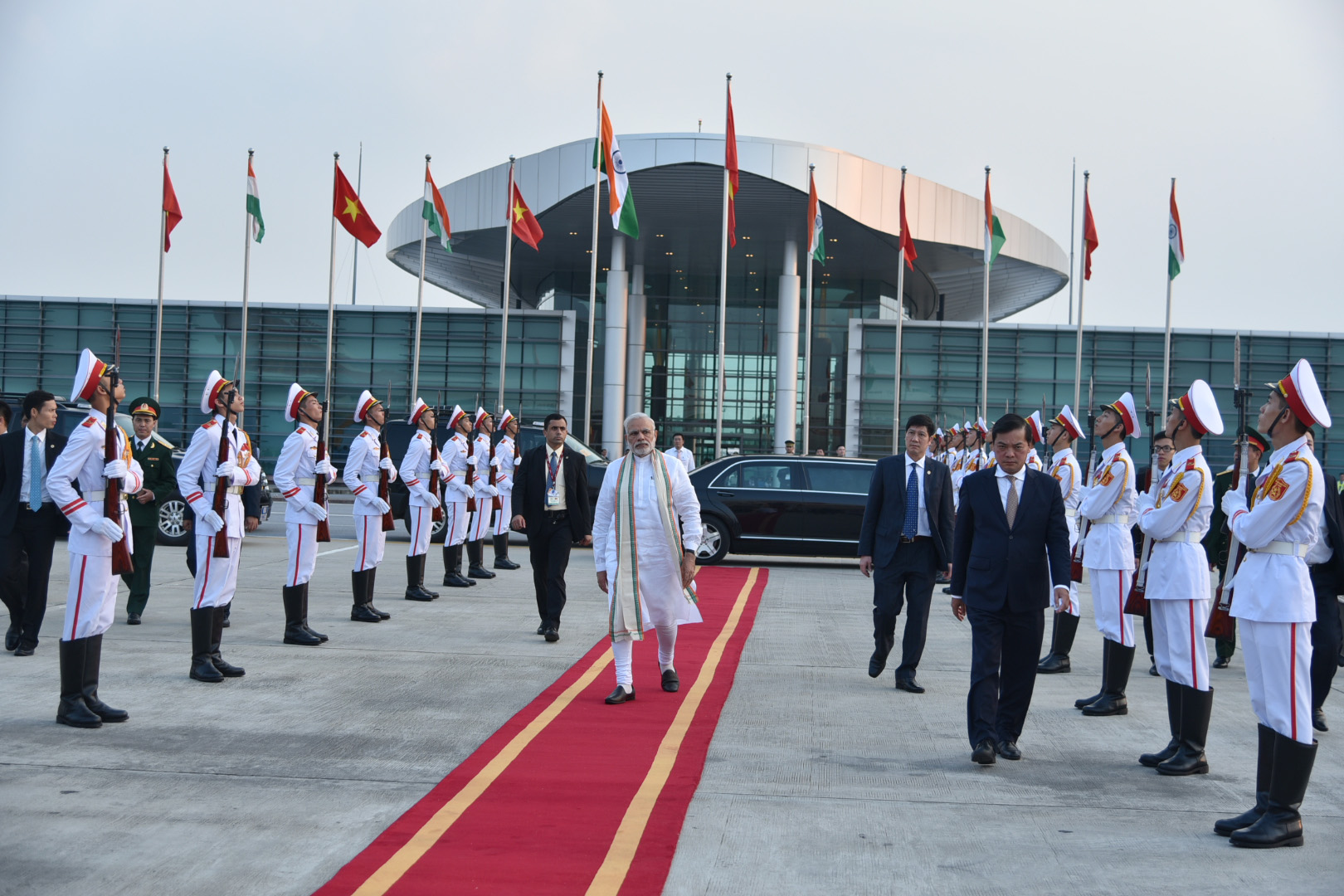
The VVIP Concourse in 2016.

In May 2025, ground broke on expansion projects aimed to increase the International Terminal T2's capacity to 15 million passengers annually, from the previous 10 million passengers annually by expanding the structure of the terminal on both ends, and adding jetways. The expansion will add 61,100m² of floor and renovate 18.730m² of floor. It will add 4 check-in islands, 6 baggage conveyor belts, 96 traditional check-in counters, add 10 check-in kiosks, and 14 jet bridges of both Code C and E. The project has been completed in 2026. Funding for the expansion costs 4.6 trillion VND (US$174.64 million), paid by the Airports Corporation of Vietnam.

The airport has a 3,800-meter paved runway (equipped with ILS CAT II – 11R/29L) which opened in August 2006 and an older 3,200-meter paved runway (also equipped with ILS CAT II – 11L/29R). The older runway was closed for upgrades for 4 months from August to December 2014. The distance between the two runways is only 250 metres, so the airport currently restricts the maximum passenger capacity in accordance with International Civil Aviation Organization safety regulations.

The AMAN/DMAN system was implemented at the airport in October 2021 to manage and arrange the shortest flight trajectory of each flight, allowing to increased passenger capacity and airspace operations. Trails for an Airport Collaborative Decision Making system has begun in 2026

=== Awards ===
Following the inauguration of the new international terminal, the Noi Bai International Airport received the World's Most Improved Airport Award from Skytrax.

The construction project of the new Noi Bai international terminal also received the JICA President Award for 2015.

=== Transit ===
One can generally do an international transit through the airport without a visa as long as one does not need to leave the security area. There is the ability to pick up boarding passes within the security area including for some low cost airlines like VietJet.

== Airlines and destinations ==
=== Passenger ===
Airlines	Destinations
9 Air	Guangzhou
Air China	Beijing–Capital, Chengdu–Tianfu (begins 13 January 2027), Hangzhou, Shanghai–Pudong
Air India	Delhi
AirAsia	Kuala Lumpur–International
AirAsia Cambodia	Phnom Penh
Akasa Air	Mumbai–Shivaji
All Nippon Airways	Tokyo–Narita
Arkia	Tel Aviv
Bamboo Airways	Da Lat, Da Nang, Ho Chi Minh City, Nha Trang, Quy Nhon; Charter: Lijiang
Batik Air Malaysia	Kuala Lumpur–International
Cathay Pacific	Hong Kong
Cebu Pacific	Clark, Manila
Chengdu Airlines	Chengdu–Tianfu
China Airlines	Taipei–Taoyuan
China Eastern Airlines	Kunming, Shanghai–Pudong, Xi'an, Wuhan
China Southern Airlines	Changsha, Guangzhou, Shenzhen
Emirates	Dubai–International
Ethiopian Airlines	Addis Ababa
Etihad Airways	Abu Dhabi
EVA Air	Taipei–Taoyuan
GX Airlines	Guilin, Jinan, Nanning
HK Express	Hong Kong
IndiGo	Delhi, Kolkata
IrAero	Irkutsk
Juneyao Air	Shanghai–Pudong
Korean Air	Seoul–Incheon
Lao Airlines	Luang Prabang, Vientiane
LOT Polish Airlines	Warsaw–Chopin (resumes 1 April 2027)
Lucky Air	Dali
Malaysia Airlines	Kuala Lumpur–International
Myanmar Airways International	Yangon
Parata Air	Seoul–Incheon
Philippine Airlines	Manila
Philippines AirAsia	Manila
Qatar Airways	Doha
Scoot	Singapore
Shandong Airlines	Jinan, Qingdao
Shenzhen Airlines	Guangzhou, Shenzhen
Singapore Airlines	Singapore
Starlux Airlines	Taipei–Taoyuan
Sun PhuQuoc Airways	Da Nang, Ho Chi Minh City, Hong Kong Phu Quoc, Seoul–Incheon, Shanghai–Pudong (begins 27 November 2026)
Thai AirAsia	Bangkok–Don Mueang, Chiang Mai, Luang Prabang
Thai Airways International	Bangkok–Suvarnabhumi
Turkish Airlines	Istanbul
VietJet Air	Almaty, Ahmedabad, Bangkok–Suvarnabhumi, Beijing–Daxing, Buon Ma Thuot, Busan, Can Tho, Cebu, Chengdu–Tianfu, Chu Lai, Colombo–Bandaranaike (begins 9 February 2027), Con Dao, Da Lat, Da Nang, Delhi, Denpasar, Dong Hoi, Fukuoka, Guangzhou, Hiroshima, Ho Chi Minh City, Hong Kong, Hue, Jakarta–Soekarno-Hatta, Kaohsiung, Kuala Lumpur–International, Malé (begins 9 February 2027), Mumbai–Shivaji, Nagoya–Centrair, Nha Trang, Osaka–Kansai, Prague Phu Quoc, Phuket, Pleiku, Quy Nhon, Seoul–Incheon, Shanghai–Pudong, Shizuoka, Siem Reap, Singapore, Taichung, Tainan, Taipei–Taoyuan, Tokyo–Narita, Tuy Hoa, Vladivostok, Xi'an, Yangon, Zhangjiajie; Seasonal charter: Vladivostok
Vietnam Airlines	Ahmedabad, Amsterdam, Bangkok–Suvarnabhumi, Beijing–Capital, Beijing–Daxing, Bengaluru, Buon Ma Thuot, Busan, Can Tho, Cebu, Chengdu–Tianfu, Chu Lai, Da Lat, Da Nang, Delhi, Dien Bien, Dong Hoi, Frankfurt, Fukuoka, Guangzhou, Haikou, Hangzhou (begins 15 November 2026), Ho Chi Minh City, Hong Kong, Hue, Hyderabad, Jakarta–Soekarno-Hatta, Kaohsiung, Kuala Lumpur–International, London–Heathrow, Luang Prabang, Manila, Melbourne, Milan–Malpensa, Moscow–Sheremetyevo, Mumbai–Shivaji, Munich, Nagoya–Centrair, Nha Trang, Osaka–Kansai, Paris–Charles de Gaulle, Phnom Penh, Phu Quoc, Pleiku, Quy Nhon, Seoul–Incheon, Shanghai–Pudong, Shenzhen, Siem Reap, Singapore, Sydney–Kingsford Smith, Taipei–Taoyuan, Tokyo–Haneda, Tokyo–Narita, Tuy Hoa, Vientiane, Vinh
Vietravel Airlines	Bangkok–Suvarnabhumi, Ho Chi Minh City
West Air	Chongqing, Enshi
XiamenAir	Beijing–Daxing, Fuzhou, Nanjing, Qingdao, Xiamen

=== Cargo ===
Airlines	Destinations
Aerotranscargo	Delhi, Dubai–Al Maktoum, Hong Kong
Asiana Cargo	Chongqing, Seoul–Incheon, Singapore
Atlas Air	Delhi, Hong Kong, Seoul–Incheon, Singapore, Taipei–Taoyuan
Cathay Cargo	Dhaka, Ho Chi Minh City, Hong Kong, Penang, Singapore
Emirates SkyCargo	Auckland, Dubai–Al Maktoum
Etihad Cargo	Abu Dhabi, Anchorage, Chittagong
EVA Air Cargo	Taipei–Taoyuan
IndiGo CarGo	Kolkata
Jeju Air Cargo	Seoul–Incheon
K-Mile Air	Bangkok–Suvarnabhumi, Hong Kong
Korean Air Cargo	Delhi, Dhaka, Navoi, Penang, Seoul–Incheon, Vienna
Lufthansa Cargo	Frankfurt, Mumbai
Qatar Airways Cargo	Doha
SF Airlines	Hangzhou, Wuhan
Turkmenistan Airlines	Ashgabat

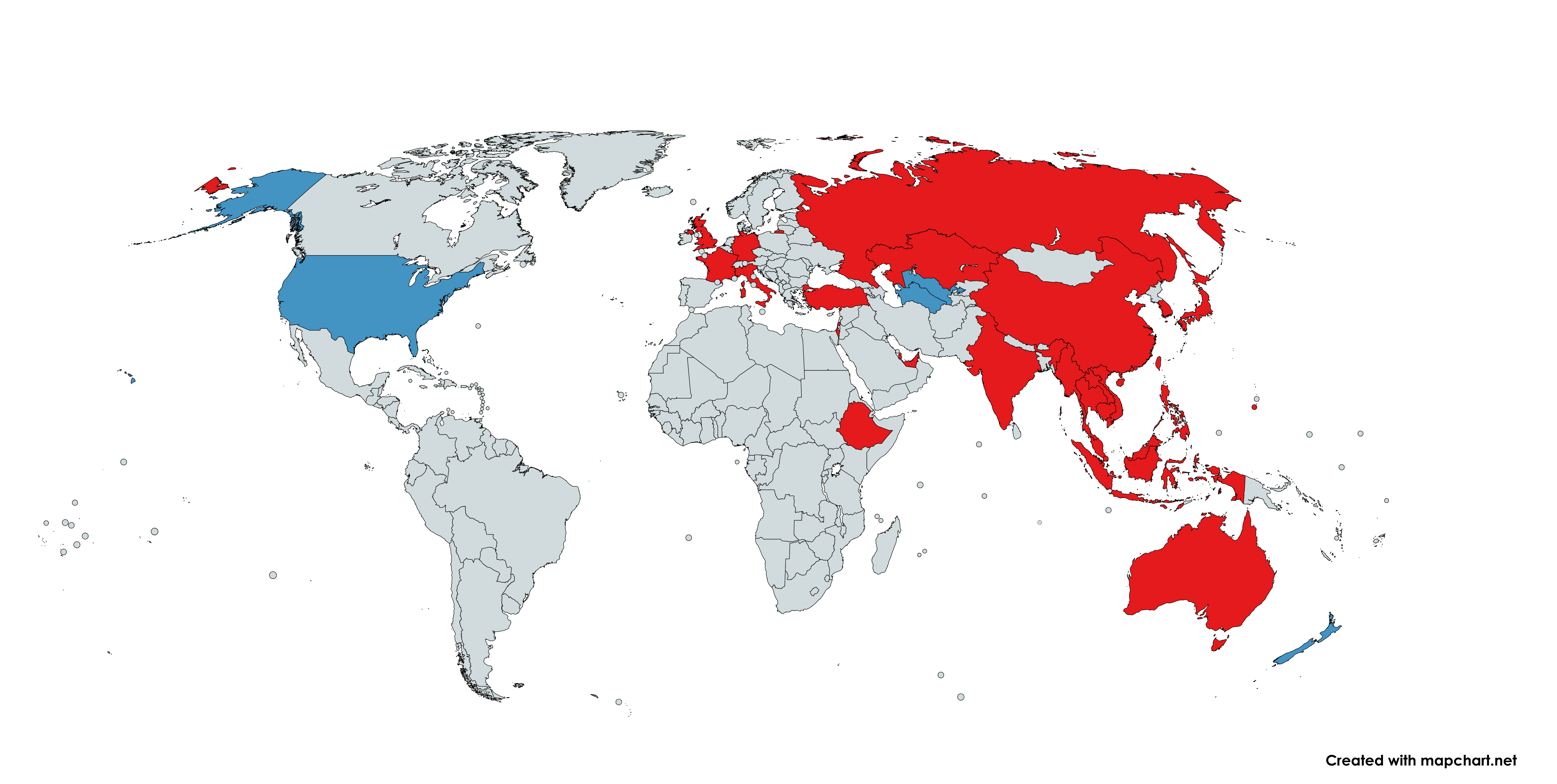
Red shows passenger destinations, blue shows cargo-only destinations

== Ground transportation ==
The future lines 2 and 6 of Hanoi Metro are planned to be extended to the airport. Hanoi's public bus service bus number 86 with its distinct orange color, travels directly from Noi Bai Airport (both T1 and T2 Terminals) to the Old Quarter and Hanoi Railway Station for 45,000 VND (~$2). Taxis are available around the arrival section outside both of the terminals. To move from the T1 terminal to the T2 terminal, electric buses operated by VinBus are also available from 5am to 1h15am the next day, free of charge.

== Statistics ==
Busiest international flights out of Nội Bài International Airport by frequency
Rank	Destinations	Frequency (weekly)
1	Seoul–Incheon	108
2	Singapore	75
3	Bangkok (Don Mueang + Suvarnabhumi)	64
4	Taipei–Taoyuan	46
5	Kuala Lumpur	44
6	Tokyo (Haneda + Narita)	42
7	Guangzhou	32
8	Hong Kong	31
9	Busan	28
10	Siem Reap	19

Busiest domestic flights out of Nội Bài International Airport by frequency
Rank	Destinations	Frequency (weekly)
1	Ho Chi Minh City	475
2	Da Nang	320
3	Nha Trang	102
4	Phu Quoc	69
5	Da Lat	48
6	Can Tho	42
7	Hue	40
8	Quy Nhon	36
9	Buon Ma Thuot	24
10	Pleiku	21

Operational statistics of Noi Bai International Airport
Year	Passengers handled	Passenger % change	Cargo (tonnes)	Cargo % change	Aircraft movements	Aircraft % change
2013	12,847,056	N/A	352,322	N/A	89,835	N/A
2014	14,190,675	▲10.6	405,407	▲16.4	100,864	▲12.3
2015	17,213,715	▲19.85	478,637	▲18.1	119,330	▲ N/A
2016	20,596,632	▲19.65	566,000	▲18.2	N/A	N/A
2017	23,824,400	▲15.7	712,677	▲25.99	N/A	N/A
2018	25,908,048	▲8.7	728,414	▲8.7	164,668	N/A
2019	29,304,631	▲13.1	708,580	▼2.7	N/A	N/A

== Future Expansions ==
There are also plans to expand the airport to 63 million passengers per year by 2030, and to 100 million passengers per year by 2050. In addition, a proposed Terminal 3 is expected to be designed and built to the south of the airport, as well as a third and fourth runway.

== See also ==
- List of airports in Vietnam
