= Nội Bài =

Nội Bài Xã Nội Bài
- Commune
- Interactive map of Nội Bài
- Location within Hanoi Location within Vietnam Nội Bài (Asia)
- Coordinates: 21°13′44″N 105°45′31″E
- Country: Vietnam
- Region: Red River Delta
- Municipality: Hà Nội

Government
  - People Committee's Chairman: Hồ Việt Hùng

Population (2025)
  - Total: 70,469
  - Ethnicities: Kinh
- Time zone: UTC+7 (Indochina Time)
- ZIP code: 10000–11700 (Note: An official code from December 31, 2023, to present.)
- Climate: Cwa
- Website: Official website

Nội Bài (Vietnamese pronunciation: [no̰ʔj˨˩ ɓa̤ːj˨˩]) is a Commune (xã) of Hanoi, the capital city of Vietnam. Nội Bài International Airport is located in this commune.

== Geography ==
The commune has a natural area of 51.58 km^{2}, population of 70,469 people. The North borders Kim Anh commune, the West borders Vĩnh Phúc province, Tiến Thắng commune and Quang Minh commune, the East borders Sóc Sơn commune, the South borders Quang Minh commune and Phú Thịnh commune.

== Transportation ==
The Noi Bai International Airport is located in Nội Bài.
