= Pleiku Airport =

Airport in Vietnam

Pleiku Airport Cảng hàng không Pleiku
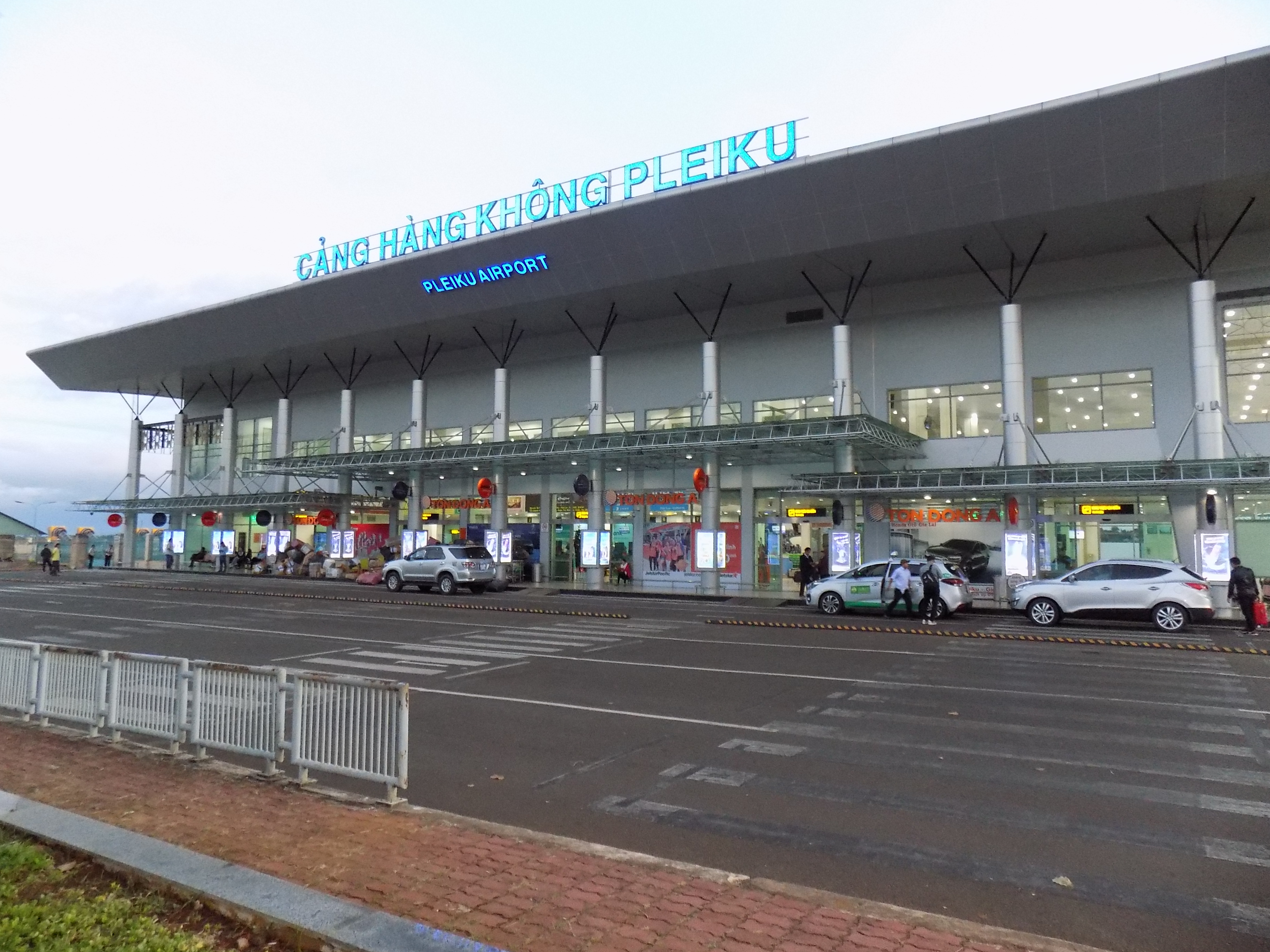
- Pleiku Airport in 2018
- IATA: PXU; ICAO: VVPK

Summary
- Airport type: Public
- Operator: Middle Airport Authority
- Serves: Pleiku and Kon Tum
- Elevation AMSL: 2,441 ft (744 m)
- Coordinates: 14°00′16″N 108°01′02″E

Map
- Location of airport in Vietnam

Runways
Direction	Length		Surface
Direction	m	ft	Surface
09/27	2,400	7,874	Asphalt

Pleiku Airport (IATA: PXU, ICAO: VVPK) is a regional airport located near the ward of Pleiku within Gia Lai Province in southern Vietnam.

== Airlines and destinations ==
Airlines	Destinations
Bamboo Airways	Da Nang, Hai Phong, Hanoi, Ho Chi Minh City
Pacific Airlines	Ho Chi Minh City
VietJet Air	Hai Phong, Hanoi, Ho Chi Minh City
Vietnam Airlines	Hanoi, Ho Chi Minh City

If passengers would fly internationally from this airport, they would need to transit in either Hanoi or Ho Chi Minh City to get to other international destinations.

== Statistics ==
Flights Out of Pleiku Airport by Frequency
Rank	Destinations	Frequency (Weekly)
1	Ho Chi Minh City	28
2	Hanoi	14

== History ==
Pleiku Airport was little more than an undeveloped air strip in December 1962 when it was designated by the Republic of Vietnam Air Force (VNAF) as Air Base 62. It was expanded during the Vietnam War and became a major air base for the VNAF and United States Air Force activities, but never reached the saturation and population proportions of the major air bases of the coastal lowlands. After 1975, it was developed into a civil airport.

== See also ==
- List of airports in Vietnam
