= Tuy Hoa Airport =

Airport in Vietnam

Tuy Hoa Airport Sân bay Tuy Hòa
- IATA: TBB; ICAO: VVTH

Summary
- Airport type: Public
- Operator: Airports Corporation of Vietnam
- Serves: Tuy Hòa
- Location: Phú Yên, Đắk Lắk, Vietnam
- Elevation AMSL: 6 m (20 ft)
- Coordinates: 13°02′58″N 109°20′01″E
- Website: www.tuyhoaairport.vn

Map
- Location of airport in Vietnam

Runways
Direction	Length		Surface
Direction	m	ft	Surface
03/21	2,902	9,518	Concrete
02/20	~~844~~	~~2,769~~	~~Asphalt~~(Closed)
03R/21L	~~2,935~~	~~9,300~~	~~Concrete~~ (Closed)

Statistics (2022)
- Total passengers: 620,000
- Sources: GCM, STV

Tuy Hoa Airport (IATA: TBB, ICAO: VVTH) is located at Phú Yên ward, just south of former Tuy Hòa city within the Đắk Lắk province, along the central coast of southern Vietnam.

It was built in 1966 for the United States Air Force as Tuy Hoa Air Base. It was used by the U.S. Air Force (1966–70) and U.S. Army (1970-71), during the Vietnam War. It was transferred to the Republic of Vietnam in 1971, and came under Communist control after the South Vietnamese collapse of 1975.

== Airlines and destinations ==
Airlines	Destinations
Bamboo Airways	Hanoi, Ho Chi Minh City
Pacific Airlines	Ho Chi Minh City
VietJet Air	Hanoi, Ho Chi Minh City
Vietnam Airlines	Hanoi, Ho Chi Minh City

The nearest international airport is Cam Ranh International Airport, which is located 162 km (101 mi) south of Tuy Hoa Airport. The airport provides most domestic destinations to other parts of Vietnam as well as international routes to China, Kazakhstan, South Korea, Thailand, and Russia.
