= Phu Quoc International Airport =

Airport serving Phu Quoc, Vietnam

Phu Quoc International Airport Sân bay quốc tế Phú Quốc Cảng hàng không quốc tế Phú Quốc
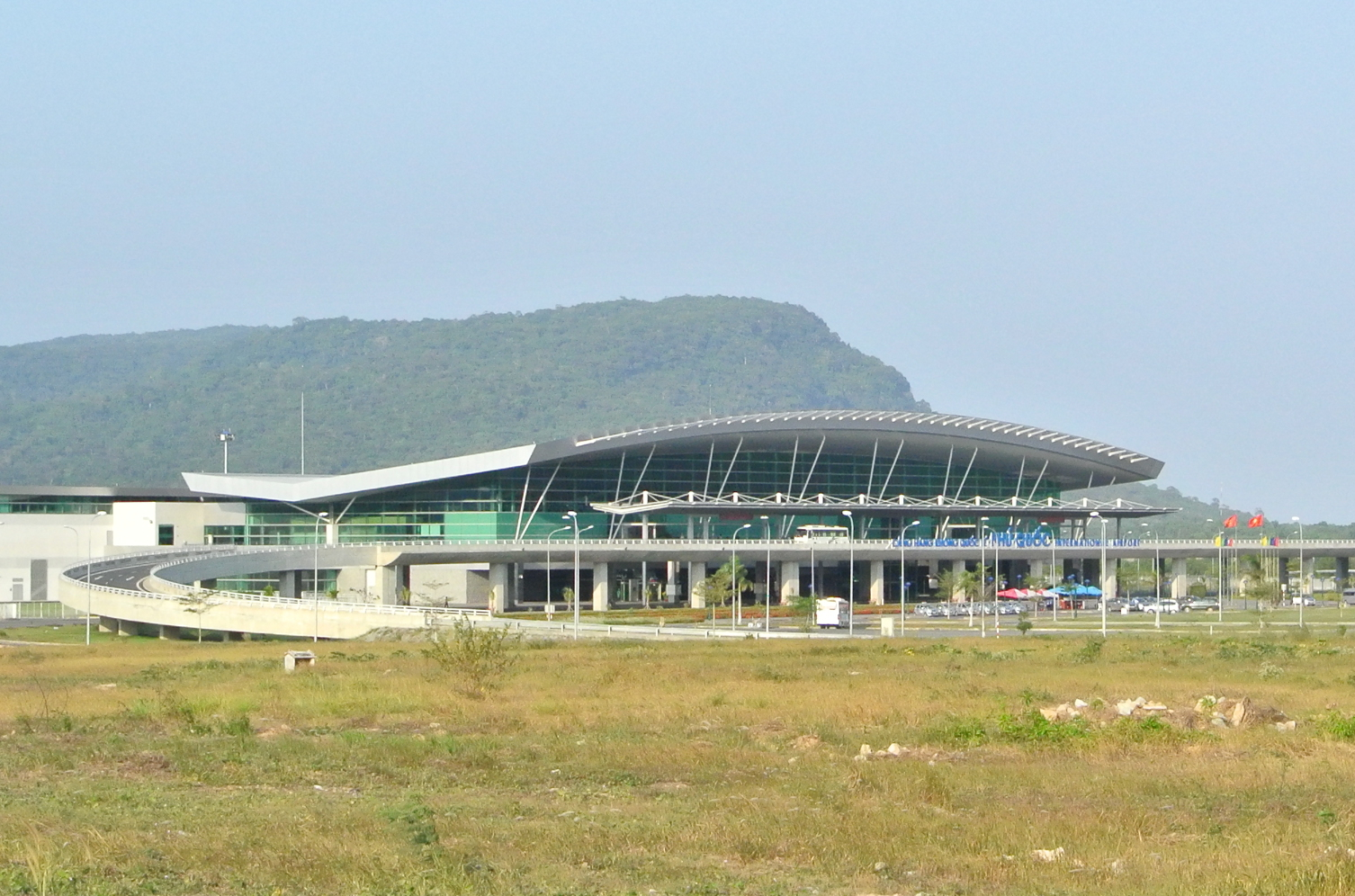
- Terminal 1
- IATA: PQC; ICAO: VVPQ

Summary
- Airport type: Public
- Owner/Operator: Sun Airport JSC
- Serves: Phú Quốc
- Location: Phú Quốc, An Giang, Vietnam
- Opened: 2 December 2012; 13 years ago
- Hub for: Vietnam Airlines; Sun PhuQuoc Airways
- Operating base for: Bamboo Airways; Pacific Airlines; VietJet Air; Vietravel Airlines
- Elevation AMSL: 11 m (36 ft)
- Coordinates: 10°10′18″N 103°59′28″E
- Website: sunairport.vn

Maps
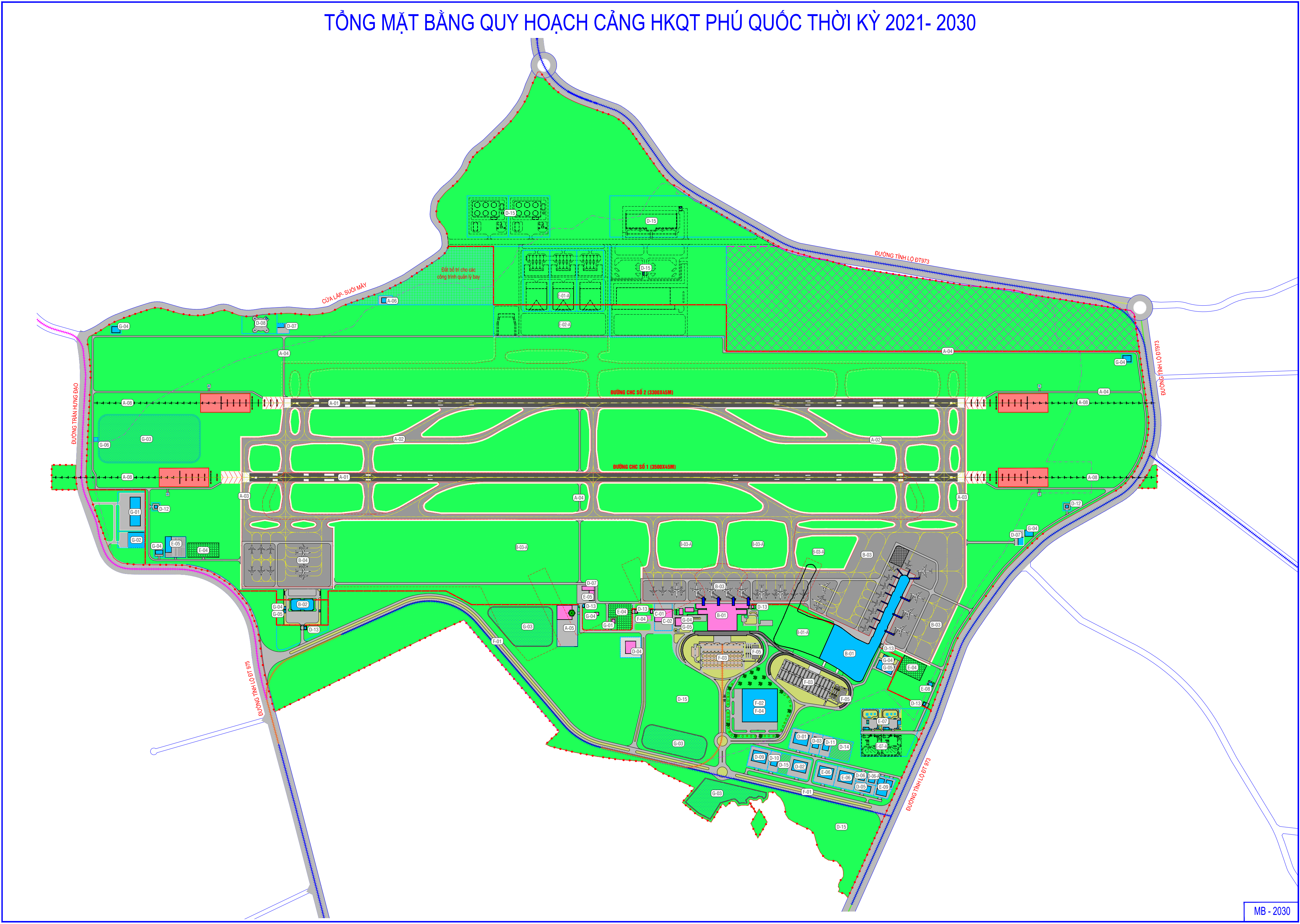
- 2030 masterplan

- Location of airport in Phu Quoc Island PQC/VVPQ (Vietnam)

Runways
Direction	Length		Surface
Direction	m	ft	Surface
10R/28L	3,000	9,843	Asphalt
10L/28R	3,300	10,827	Concrete

Statistics (2019)
- Total passengers: 3,700,205 (▲14.1%)
- Source: Taseco Airs

Phu Quoc International Airport (IATA: PQC, ICAO: VVPQ) is an international airport that serves Phú Quốc Island, in southern Vietnam. It covers nearly 900 hectares of land in the former commune of Dương Tơ, about 9 kilometres (5.6 mi) south of the administrative centre of Phu Quoc special zone. It is built at a cost of around VND 16.2 trillion (US$810 million) and is planned to be built in phases. The airport is 10 km from the previous Phu Quoc Airport, which it replaced in December 2012. The airport was initially able to handle about 2.5 million passengers per annum, and the maximum capacity will be 7 million passengers per annum. The airport has a single runway, capable of handling aircraft like the Airbus A350 and Boeing 747. The construction was completed in November 2012 and was put into operation on 2 December 2012. The Government of Vietnam expects the airport to facilitate the arrival of international tourists who are attracted to the island's beaches.

== History ==
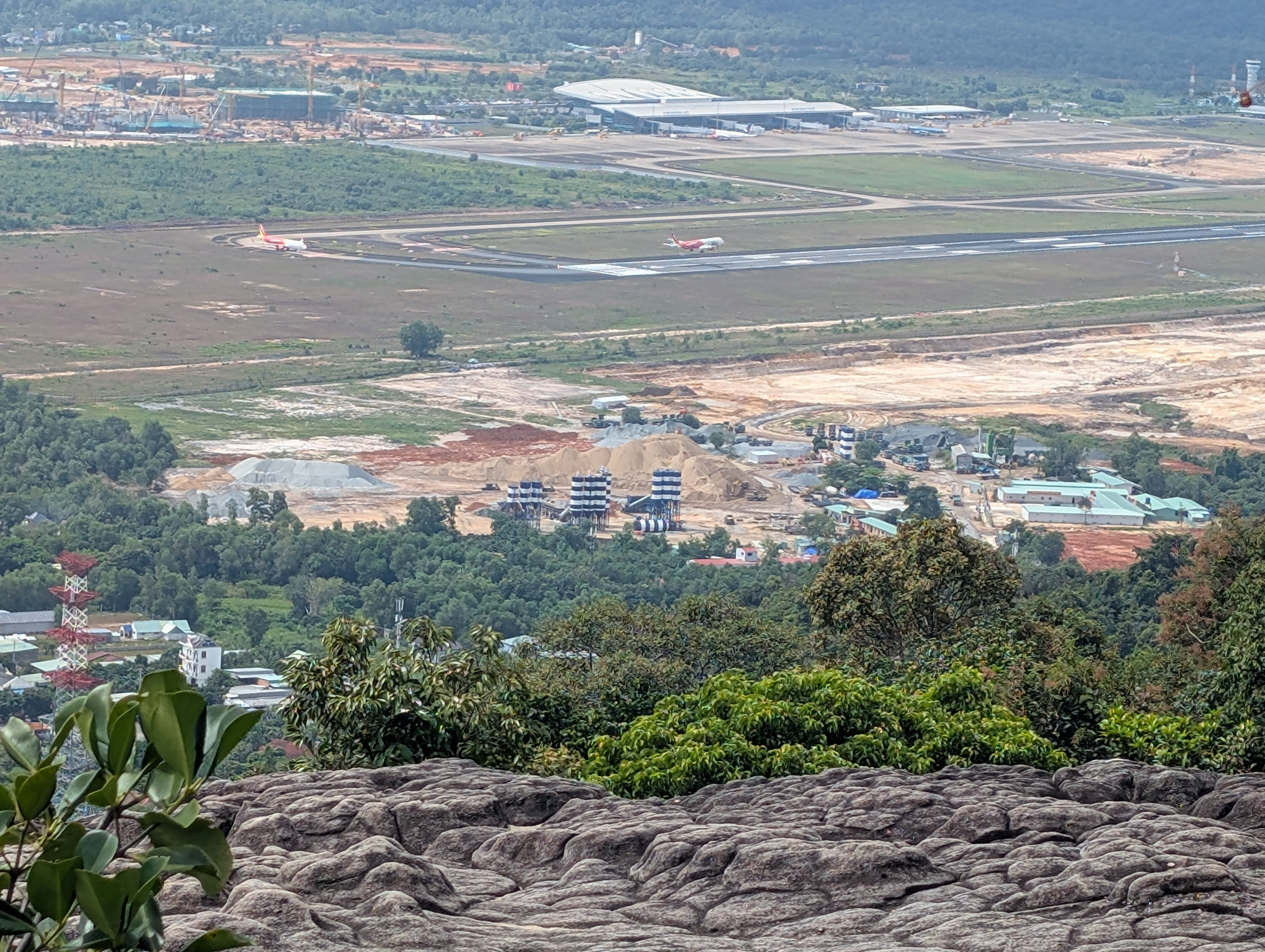
PQC in late 2025, with the construction of the second terminal and runway being visible.

Airports Corporation of Vietnam began construction of the airport on 23 November 2008 with an investment of VND 3,000 billion. It was designed by Singaporean-US design consulting firm CPG-PAE. After four years work the airport operated its inaugural flight on 15 December 2012.

In 2025, Sun Group was approved to be the main investor of the airport's major expansion plan, which includes the construction of a brand new runway alongside the lengthening of the current counterpart, alongside new terminals and facilities for APEC 2027 and long-term developments on the island. The ownership of the airport was transferred to Sun Group from the Airports Corporation of Vietnam in November 2025. Following Sun Group's investment, the airport is being upgraded with a new runway alongside extending the existing airstrip, alongside new terminals and ground facilities to serve APEC 2027, which will be hosted in the island.

== Airlines and destinations ==
Airlines	Destinations
Aeroflot	Moscow–Sheremetyevo
Aero Nomad Airlines	Seasonal charter: Bishkek
Air Astana	Seasonal: Almaty, Astana
Air India Express	Seasonal charter: Delhi
AirAsia	Kuala Lumpur–International
AirAsia Cambodia	Siem Reap
Belavia	Seasonal charter: Minsk
Berjaya Air	Kuala Lumpur–Subang
China Eastern Airlines	Beijing–Daxing, Xi'an
Eastar Jet	Seoul–Incheon
Greater Bay Airlines	Seasonal: Hong Kong
HK Express	Hong Kong
IrAero	Irkutsk
Jeju Air	Busan, Seoul–Incheon
Korean Air	Seoul–Incheon
Qanot Sharq	Seasonal charter: Tashkent
Ruili Airlines	Kunming
Scoot	Singapore
SkyUp Airlines	Seasonal charter: Bucharest, Chișinău
Starlux Airlines	Taichung, Taipei–Taoyuan
Sunday Airlines	Seasonal charter: Almaty, Astana, Taraz
Sun PhuQuoc Airways	Ahmedabad (begins 2 December 2026), Chengdu–Tianfu, Da Nang, Hanoi, Ho Chi Minh City, Hong Kong, Kuala Lumpur–International, Nha Trang, Seoul–Incheon, Singapore, Taipei–Taoyuan, Seasonal charter: Almaty, Moscow-Sheremetyevo, Mumbai, Vijayawada
Thai AirAsia	Bangkok–Don Mueang
Thai VietJet Air	Bangkok–Suvarnabhumi
Tigerair Taiwan	Seasonal charter: Kaohsiung
Trinity Airways	Seoul–Incheon
Uzbekistan Airways	Seasonal: Tashkent
VietJet Air	Busan, Hanoi, Ho Chi Minh City, Kaohsiung, Singapore, Taichung, Taipei–Taoyuan; Seasonal charter: Astana, Ulaanbaatar, Vladivostok Yekaterinburg (begins 26 October 2026)
Vietnam Airlines	Can Tho, Hanoi, Ho Chi Minh City
Vietravel Airlines	Seasonal charter: Taipei–Taoyuan
World2Fly	Seasonal charter: Bratislava

== See also ==
- Duong Dong Airport
