= Phu Bai International Airport =

Airport serving Hue, Vietnam

Phu Bai International Airport Sân bay Quốc tế Phú Bài
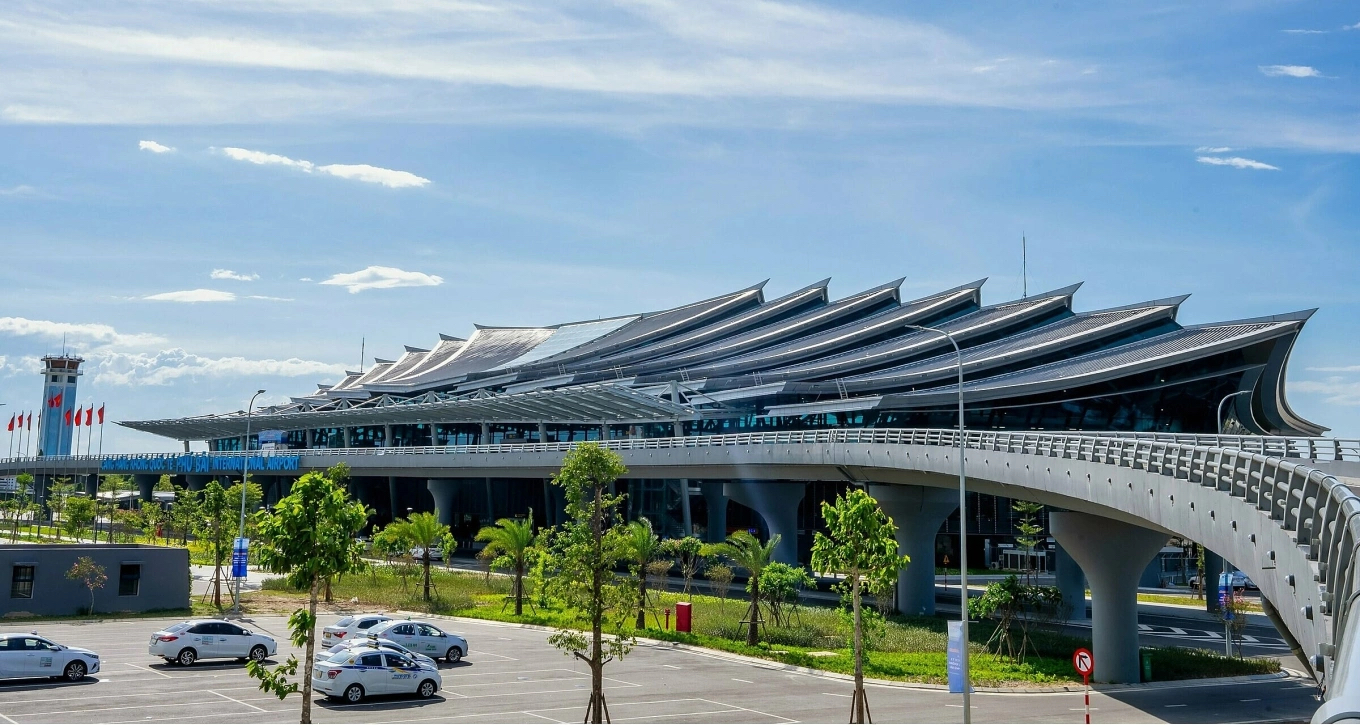
- IATA: HUI; ICAO: VVPB

Summary
- Airport type: Public
- Owner/Operator: Airports Corporation of Vietnam
- Serves: Huế, Đông Hà and Quảng Trị
- Location: Phú Bài, Huế, Vietnam
- Elevation AMSL: 15 m (49 ft)
- Coordinates: 16°24′06″N 107°42′10″E

Map
- Location of airport in Vietnam

Runways
Direction	Length		Surface
Direction	m	ft	Surface
09/27	2,700	8,858	Concrete

Statistics (2019)
- Total passengers: 1,931,939 ▲5.5%
- Source: Taseco Airs

Phu Bai International Airport (IATA: HUI, ICAO: VVPB) is located in Phú Bài (where the airport was named after) in the southeast of the central city of Huế, the historic capital of Vietnam.

== History ==
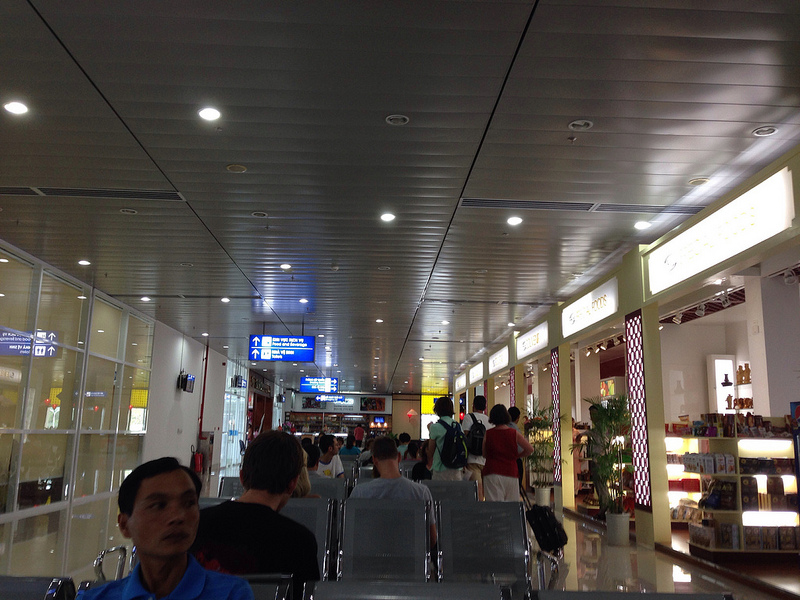
Terminal interior

On October 30, 2005, Phú Bài Airport officially welcomed its first international flight since being allowed to receive international flights by the Vietnamese government in 2002. The charter flight operated by Austrian Airlines carried Austrian tourists from Luang Prabang, Laos.

On May 24, 2007, Changi Airports International (CAI) announced that it had signed a memorandum of understanding (MOU) with the People's Committee of Thua Thien Hue Province for the development of Phu Bai–Hue International Airport. This MOU was signed as part of the Vietnamese government's launch of a tourism master plan to develop Thua Thien Hue Province as the next international tourism destination of Vietnam.

The MOU was signed by Nguyen Xuan Ly, chairman of the People's Committee of Thua Thien Hue Province, and Chow Kok Fong, chief executive officer of CAI in Vietnam. The event was witnessed by officials from the Civil Aviation Administration of Vietnam (CAAV).

On February 23, 2013, Phú Bài Airport was expected to close for eight months for runway repairs and upgrades, estimated to cost between 500 and 600 billion Vietnam dong. The airport was actually closed from March 20 to September 20, two months less than planned. During this period, tourists who wished to travel to Hue by air had to use Da Nang International Airport.

A new terminal invested by the Airports Corporation of Vietnam with total investment of about VNĐ2.250 trillion (US$96.9 million) will cover about 10,118sq.m and have a capacity of five million passengers per year by 2020 and up to 7 million passengers by 2025. This terminal is scheduled to be finished by the end of 2021.

== Terminal 2 ==
Terminal T2 has two floors. The first floor includes the arrival hall, baggage conveyor belt, immigration area, port authority, customs, VIP waiting room, lost luggage room, and security control. The second floor is the area for domestic and international check-in procedures, security control, departure, and waiting to board the plane. The terminal also has two waiting areas for businessmen and VIP passengers.

Terminal T2 is connected to the aircraft parking area by four telescopic bridges, including three code C bridges and one double telescopic bridge, which can handle one code E aircraft or two code C aircraft at the same time. There are also auxiliary facilities such as car, taxi, bus, and convoy parking lots in front of the terminal.

== Airlines and destinations ==
Airlines	Destinations
Hai Au Aviation	Da Nang
Pacific Airlines	Hanoi, Ho Chi Minh City
VietJet Air	Hanoi, Ho Chi Minh City
Vietnam Airlines	Hanoi, Ho Chi Minh City

The airport currently does not provide direct routes to international destinations. The nearest international airport is Da Nang International Airport which is located 80 km (50 mi) south of Phu Bai International Airport. However, if passengers would fly internationally from this airport, they would need to transit in either Hanoi or Ho Chi Minh City to get to other international destinations.

== See also ==
- List of airports in Vietnam
