= Côn River =

River in Vietnam

Coordinates: 13.9017°N 109.2231°E

Con River Kon River, Sông Kôn
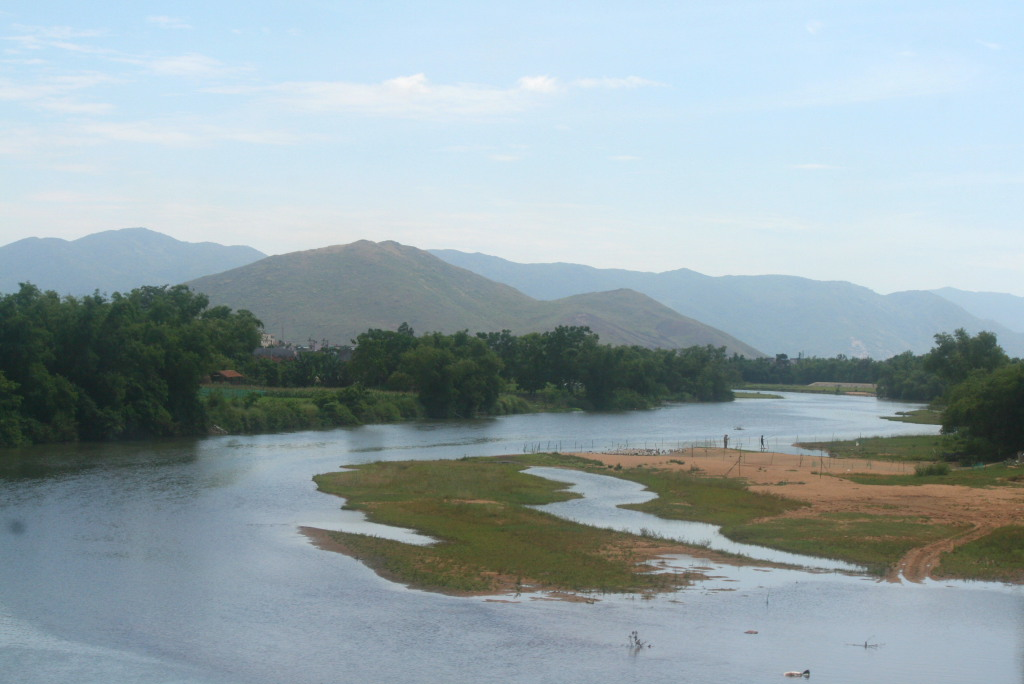
- Côn River flows through Bình Định province.

- Location within Vietnam
- Native name: Sông Côn (Vietnamese)

Location
- Country: Vietnam
- Province: Bình Định; Gia Lai

Physical characteristics
- Source: Ngọc Roo mountain range
  - location: Kon Tum
  - elevation: 925 m
- Mouth
  - location: Thi Nai lagoon
  - elevation: 0 m
- Length: 171 km (106 mi)
- Basin size: 2,980 km^{2} (1,150 sq mi)

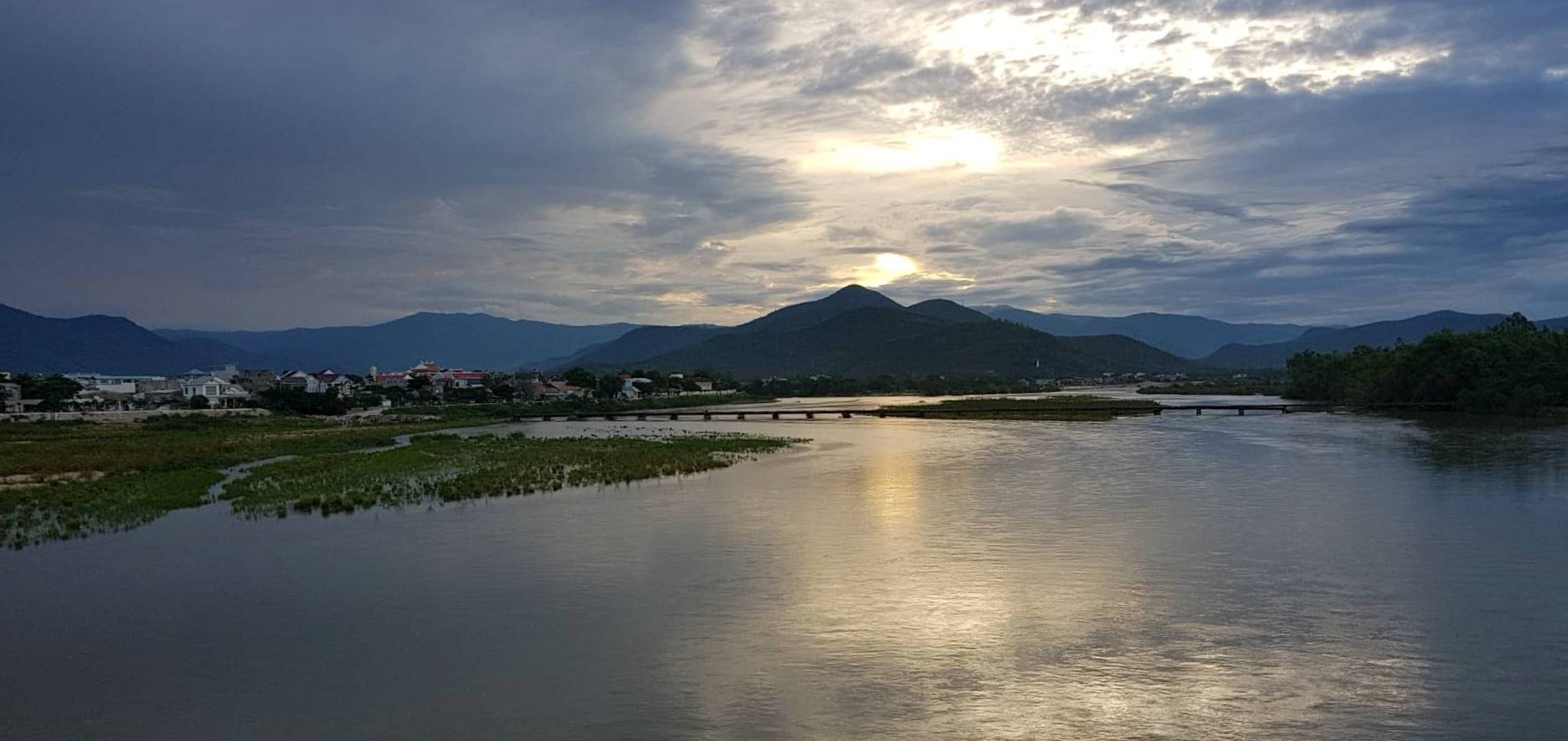
Côn river and Phu Phong town.

The Côn River (Vietnamese: Sông Côn, also Kôn River, Sông Kôn) is a river of Vietnam. With a length of 171 km, it is the longest river in Bình Định Province. Much of it can be used as an inland waterway for transportation.

It has its source at Ngọc Roo mountain at 925 m above sea level in the border region of the provinces Kontum and Gia Lai. It flows through the districts of An Lão, Vĩnh Thạnh, Tây Sơn, Vân Canh, An Nhơn và Tuy Phước. Kon River basin suffers from flood damage almost every year, especially in the downstream areas from Thi Nai wetland.

Côn River flows through the artificial Định Bình Lake in Vĩnh Thạnh District.

== Land use ==
In the basins, more than 50% of the upstream areas of the Kon River and the Ha Thanh River are classified as forest land. Whereas in the delta area of the Kon River, i.e. An Nhon and Tuy Phuoc districts, approximately 40 to 50 percent is farmland.
