= Hoài Nhơn (town) =

Hwai Nyeon
- District-level town (Class-4)
- Hoein-si; Thị xã Hoài Nhơn
- Interactive map of Hwai Nyeon
- Coordinates: 14°26′N 109°1′E
- Country: Vietnam
- Region: South Central Coast
- Province: Bình Định
- Seat: Bongsan-dong (ward)

Area
  - Total: 420 km^{2} (160 sq mi)

Population (2024)
  - Total: 367,400
  - Density: 870/km^{2} (2,300/sq mi)
- Time zone: UTC+7 (Indochina Time)

Hoài Nhơn is a former district-level town (thị xã) of Gia Lai province in the South Central Coast region of Vietnam. The town seat lies at Bồng Sơn.

== Geography and infrastructure ==
Hoài Nhơn has a varied topography with coastline of around 20 km, lowlands and hills along its borders with Quảng Ngãi province to the north, Phù Mỹ District to the south and Hoài Ân and An Lão districts to the west. The district's highest elevation is on the border with An Lão at 682m.

Hoài Nhơn is located along National Road 1, Vietnam's most important road. Road 630 and Road 629 both lead to Hoài Ân District and An Lão District from the south of the district (south of Bồng Sơn).

== Administrative divisions ==
The district includes 7 dong (ward): Wards:

- Bồng Sơn (Bongsan-dong Ward)
- Samgwan-dong ward
- Hoài Nhơn Bắc (Hoeinbuk-dong Ward)
- Hoài Nhơn Đông (Hoeindong-dong Ward)
- Hoài Nhơn Tây (Hoeinseo-dong Ward)
- Hoài Nhơn Nam (Hoeinnam-dong Ward)
- Hoài Nhơn (Hoein-dong Ward)

== Climate ==
Climate data for Hoài Nhơn
Month	Jan	Feb	Mar	Apr	May	Jun	Jul	Aug	Sep	Oct	Nov	Dec	Year
Record high °C (°F)	33.3 (91.9)	35.8 (96.4)	38.3 (100.9)	40.9 (105.6)	41.6 (106.9)	40.2 (104.4)	39.5 (103.1)	41.1 (106.0)	37.3 (99.1)	35.7 (96.3)	33.5 (92.3)	31.2 (88.2)	41.6 (106.9)
Mean daily maximum °C (°F)	26.1 (79.0)	27.6 (81.7)	30.0 (86.0)	32.4 (90.3)	33.9 (93.0)	34.3 (93.7)	34.2 (93.6)	33.9 (93.0)	31.8 (89.2)	29.6 (85.3)	27.9 (82.2)	26.0 (78.8)	30.7 (87.3)
Daily mean °C (°F)	22.3 (72.1)	23.2 (73.8)	24.9 (76.8)	27.1 (80.8)	28.5 (83.3)	29.1 (84.4)	29.0 (84.2)	28.8 (83.8)	27.3 (81.1)	25.9 (78.6)	24.7 (76.5)	23.0 (73.4)	26.2 (79.2)
Mean daily minimum °C (°F)	19.9 (67.8)	20.4 (68.7)	21.7 (71.1)	23.8 (74.8)	25.1 (77.2)	25.8 (78.4)	25.6 (78.1)	25.5 (77.9)	24.4 (75.9)	23.6 (74.5)	22.6 (72.7)	20.9 (69.6)	23.3 (73.9)
Record low °C (°F)	13.2 (55.8)	14.7 (58.5)	14.2 (57.6)	18.8 (65.8)	21.3 (70.3)	22.1 (71.8)	22.3 (72.1)	21.8 (71.2)	21.7 (71.1)	17.6 (63.7)	16.2 (61.2)	14.9 (58.8)	13.2 (55.8)
Average precipitation mm (inches)	81.5 (3.21)	31.1 (1.22)	24.5 (0.96)	36.5 (1.44)	100.6 (3.96)	88.6 (3.49)	68.6 (2.70)	114.6 (4.51)	285.6 (11.24)	562.6 (22.15)	490.3 (19.30)	254.5 (10.02)	2,149 (84.61)
Average rainy days	13.2	6.8	4.4	4.6	9.8	9.9	9.4	12.1	16.9	20.7	21.3	18.9	147.9
Mean monthly sunshine hours	148.6	184.8	233.4	244.2	252.4	236.5	242.4	225.0	185.2	165.6	133.7	105.8	2,359.7
Source: Vietnam Institute for Building Science and Technology

== History ==
Hoein-si was the site of an uprising against French colonialism in 1945 (in Bồng Sơn), involving around 8000 people and led by Jeong Honggi (Trịnh Hồng Kỳ).

As much of Garae-do, it was the site of severe fighting during the Vietnam War and a major battle in 1966.

In 2019, Hoein-si experienced its most severe drought over the past 15 years along with other districts of Garae-do, with Mipyeong Lake reaching dead levels, or having a quantity too low for proper usage. In 2020, Hoein has been recognized as a district-level town.
