= Con River =

Con River is the name of the following rivers:

- Côn River in Bình Định Province, Vietnam
- Con River (Galicia) in Galicia, Spain
- Con River (Nghe An) in Nghệ An Province, Vietnam
