= Vân Canh district =

Vân Canh district Huyện Vân Canh
- District
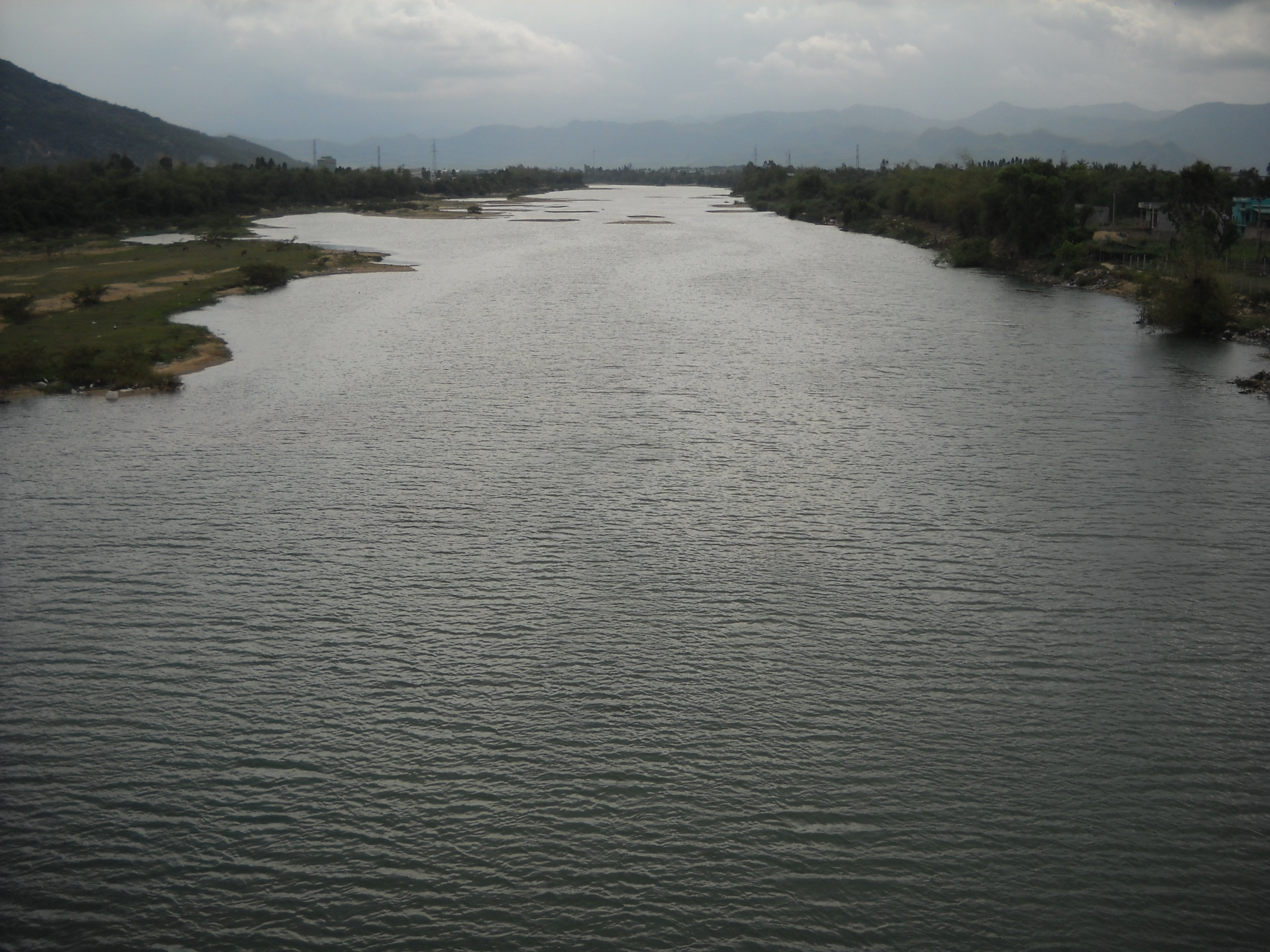
- Hà Thanh River
- Interactive map of Vân Canh district
- Location of in Vietnam
- Coordinates: 13°39′N 108°57′E
- Country: Vietnam
- Region: South Central Coast
- Province: Bình Định
- Capital: Vân Canh

Area
  - Total: 800 km^{2} (310 sq mi)

Population (2024)
  - Total: 77,930
  - Density: 97/km^{2} (250/sq mi)
- Time zone: UTC+7 (Indochina Time)

Vân Canh is a former rural district (huyện) of Bình Định province in the South Central Coast region of Vietnam. The district capital is Vân Canh. Vân Canh is a mountainous district, located in the southwest of Bình Định Province, and is relatively sparsely populated.

== Geography ==
Vân Canh borders Đồng Xuân district of Phú Yên province to the south, the districts of An Nhơn, Tây Sơn and Tuy Phước to the north, and Kông Chro district of Gia Lai province to the west.

Hà Thanh River's source is within the district and flows through it.

== Administrative divisions ==
There is one town, Vân Canh, and six communes: Canh Hòa, Canh Thuận, Canh Hiệp, Canh Hiển, Canh Vinh and Canh Liên.

== Demography ==
There are three ethnic groups living in the district: Kinh, Cham people and Ba Na. The Cham are mainly concentrated in Canh Hoà, and the Ba Na in Canh Liên, Canh Thuận and Canh Hiệp, where they exceed 40% of the total population.

The Cham people settled in the mountainous area along with the indigenous tribes after the kingdom of Champa was dismantled in 1471. As a result, the Cham have adopted many facets of Ba Na culture.

== Transport and economy ==
Most of the communes of Vân Canh District lie on provincial road 638 between Diêu Trì and Phú Yên province. Transport facilities have improved in recent years, allowing increasing economic activity and development. However, infrastructure in the remote Canh Liên commune in the west of the district is still primitive.

Vietnam's North–South Railway passes through this district. However, there is no railway station.

The standard of living is low, and the poverty rate high. The land is rather infertile and a lack of irrigation water compounds the poor productivity. In recent years, the sugar cane industry has developed substantially, and the sugar cane factory of Bình Định has grown, producing more economic opportunities. The area has a lot of idle grassland that can be exploited for grazing. The area has abundance of natural forests as well as planted ones.
