= Định Bình Reservoir =

- Định Bình Lake
- Hồ Định Bình (Vietnamese)
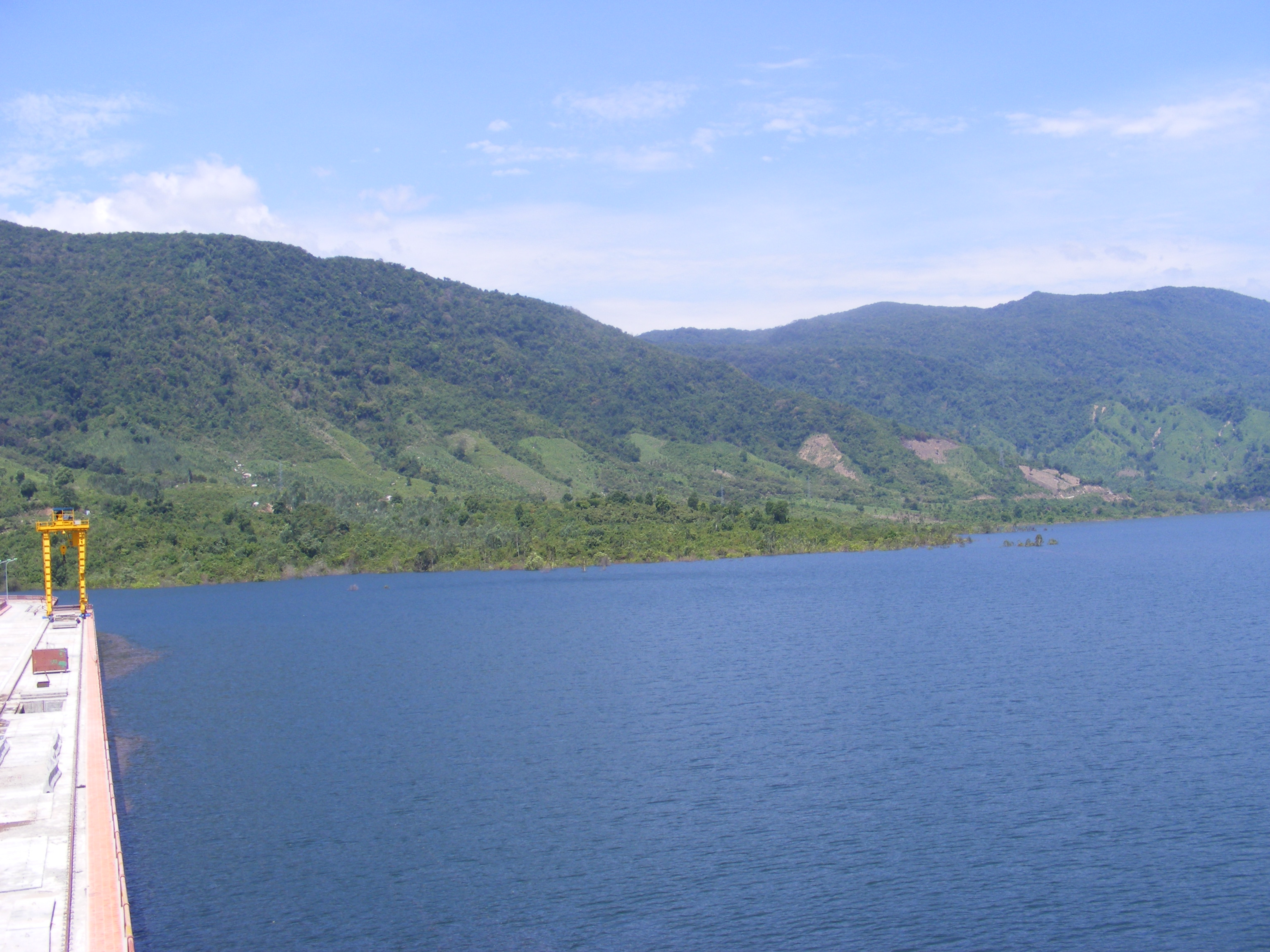
- Định Bình Lake

- Location within Vietnam Location within Southeast Asia
- Coordinates: 14°10′10″N 108°45′40″E
- Type: Reservoir
- Primary inflows: Côn River
- Basin countries: Vietnam
- Settlements: Bình Định

Định Bình Reservoir (Vietnamese: Hồ Định Bình) is a large artificial freshwater lake in Vĩnh Thạnh District, Bình Định Province, Vietnam. Work began creating the dam on Côn River in May 2003. It has a capacity of 226 million cubic metres. The lake and dam are expected to provide irrigation for some 12,545 hectares (over 48 square miles).
