= Hoài Nhơn =

- Ward
- Tam Quan Nam Border Guard Station

- Location in Vietnam
- Coordinates: 14.501473950195384°N 109.03387321709624°E
- Country: Vietnam
- Region: South Central Coast and Central Highlands
- Province: Gia Lai
- Established: 1 July 2025
- Administrative headquarters: 506 Võ Văn Kiệt Street, Trung Hóa Residential Group

Area
  - Total: 40.32 km^{2} (15.57 sq mi)

Population (31 December 2024)
  - Total: 43,167
  - Density: 1,070/km^{2} (2,800/sq mi)
- Website: hoainhon.gialai.gov.vn

Hoài Nhơn is a ward in Gia Lai province, Vietnam. The ward inherited its name from the former town of Hoài Nhơn, Bình Định province.

On 16 June 2025, the Standing Committee of the National Assembly of Vietnam issued Resolution No. 1664/NQ-UBTVQH15 on the arrangement of commune-level administrative units in Gia Lai province in 2025. Under the resolution, the entire area and population of Hoài Thanh, Hoài Thanh Tây, and Tam Quan Nam wards, formerly part of Hoài Nhơn town, were merged to form a new ward named Hoài Nhơn.
