= Phù Cát district =

Phù Cát district Huyện Phù Cát
- District
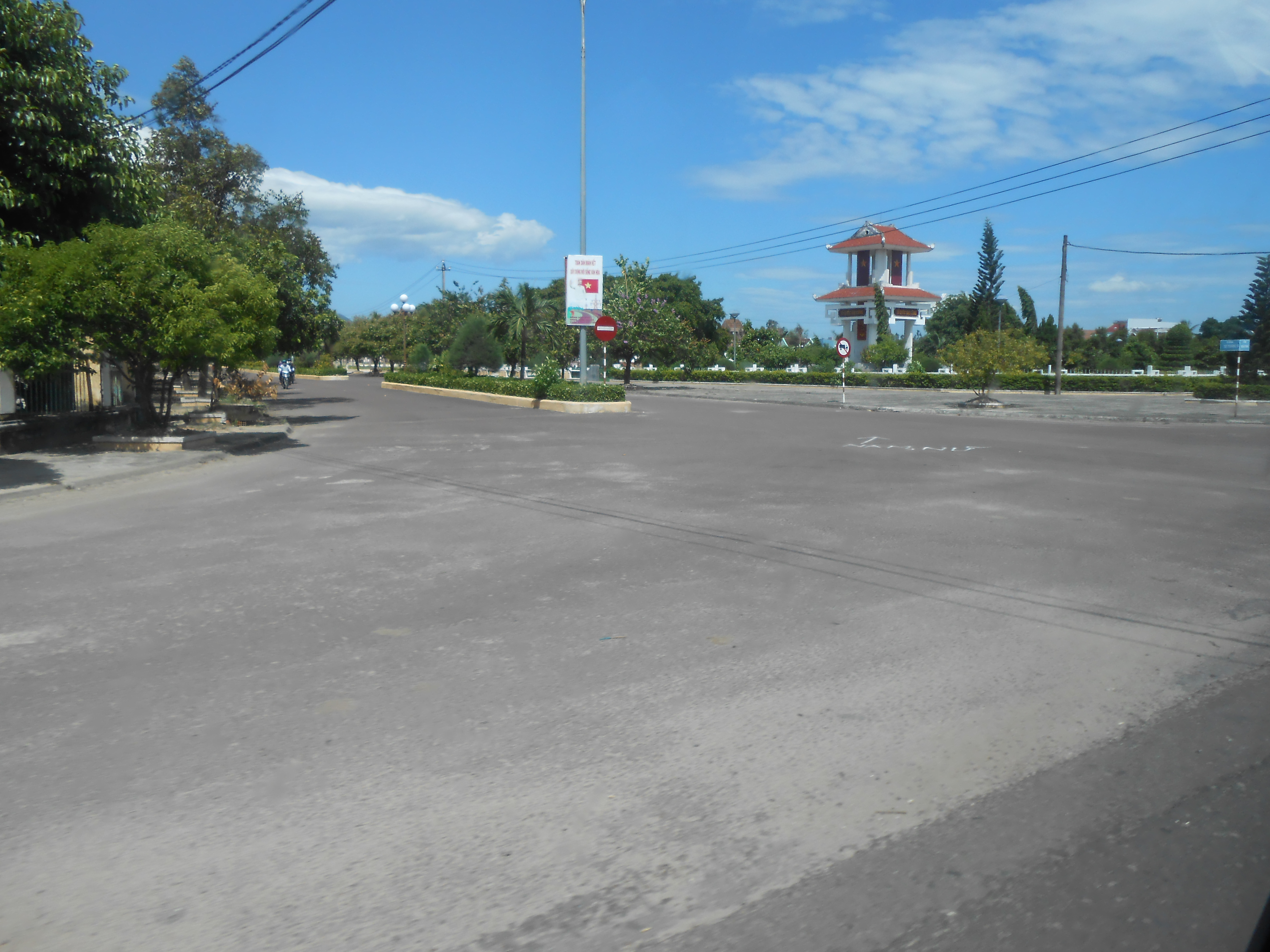
- A corner of Ngo May town in Phù Cát District

- Seal
- Interactive map of Phù Cát district
- Location of in Vietnam
- Coordinates: 13°59′N 109°3′E
- Country: Vietnam
- Region: South Central Coast
- Province: Bình Định province
- Capital: Ngô Mây

Area
  - Total: 680 km^{2} (260 sq mi)

Population (2024)
  - Total: 273,150
  - Density: 400/km^{2} (1,000/sq mi)
- Time zone: UTC+7 (Indochina Time)

Phù Cát is a former district (huyện) of Bình Định province in the South Central Coast region of Vietnam.

The district capital lies at Ngô Mây.

The district is also home to Phu Cat Airport.
