= Bình Định province =

Former province of Vietnam

Bình Định
- Province
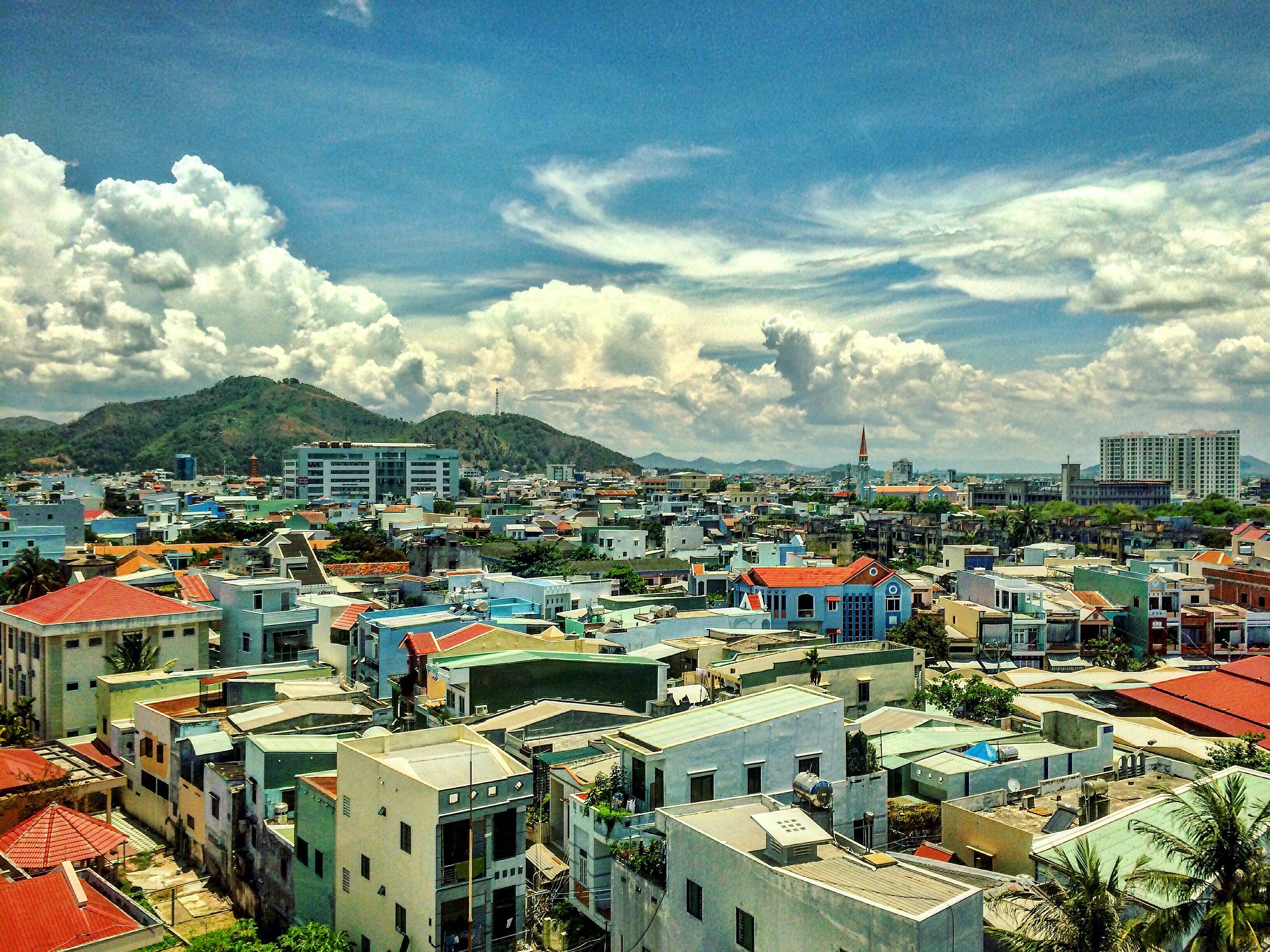
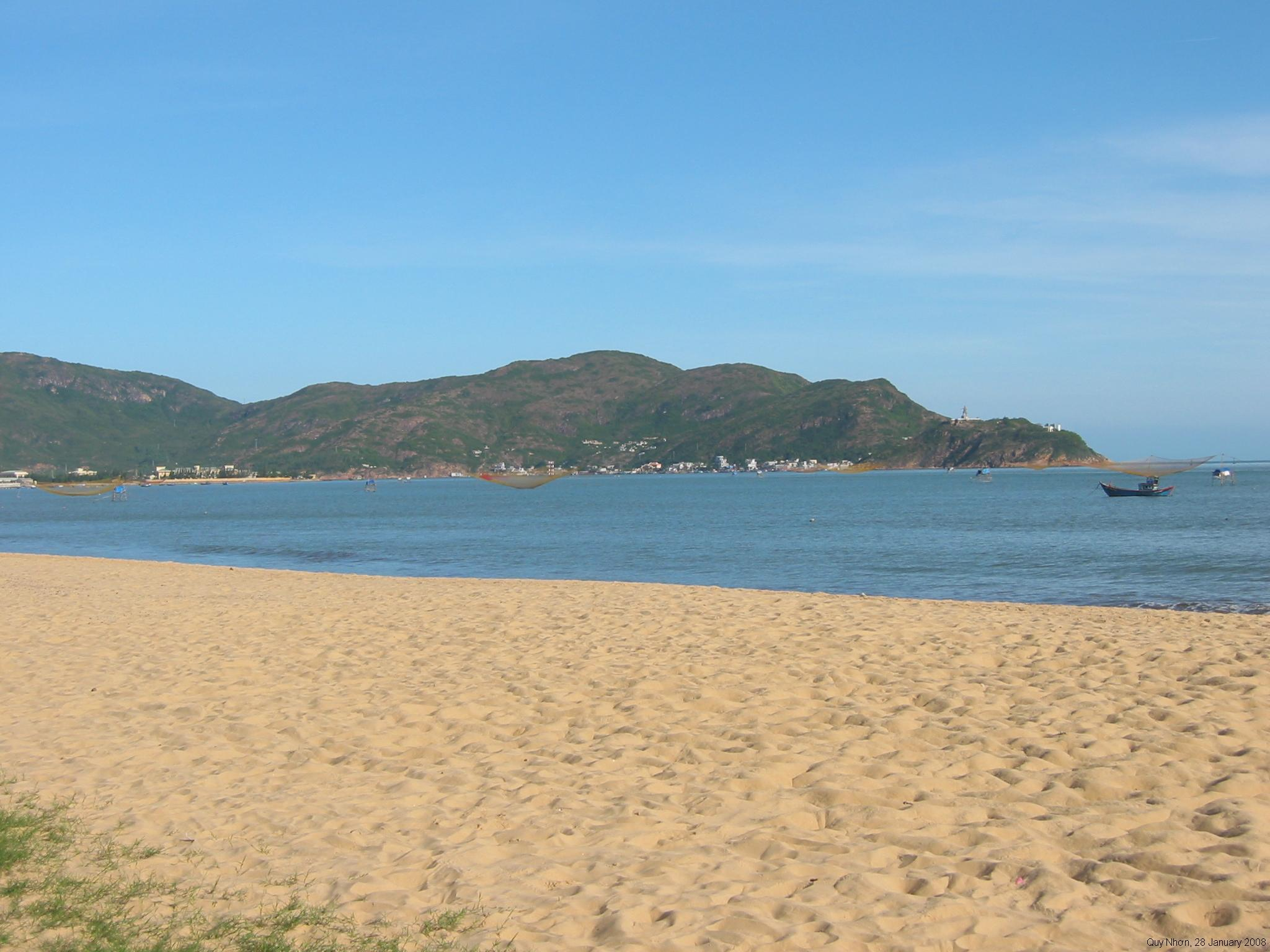
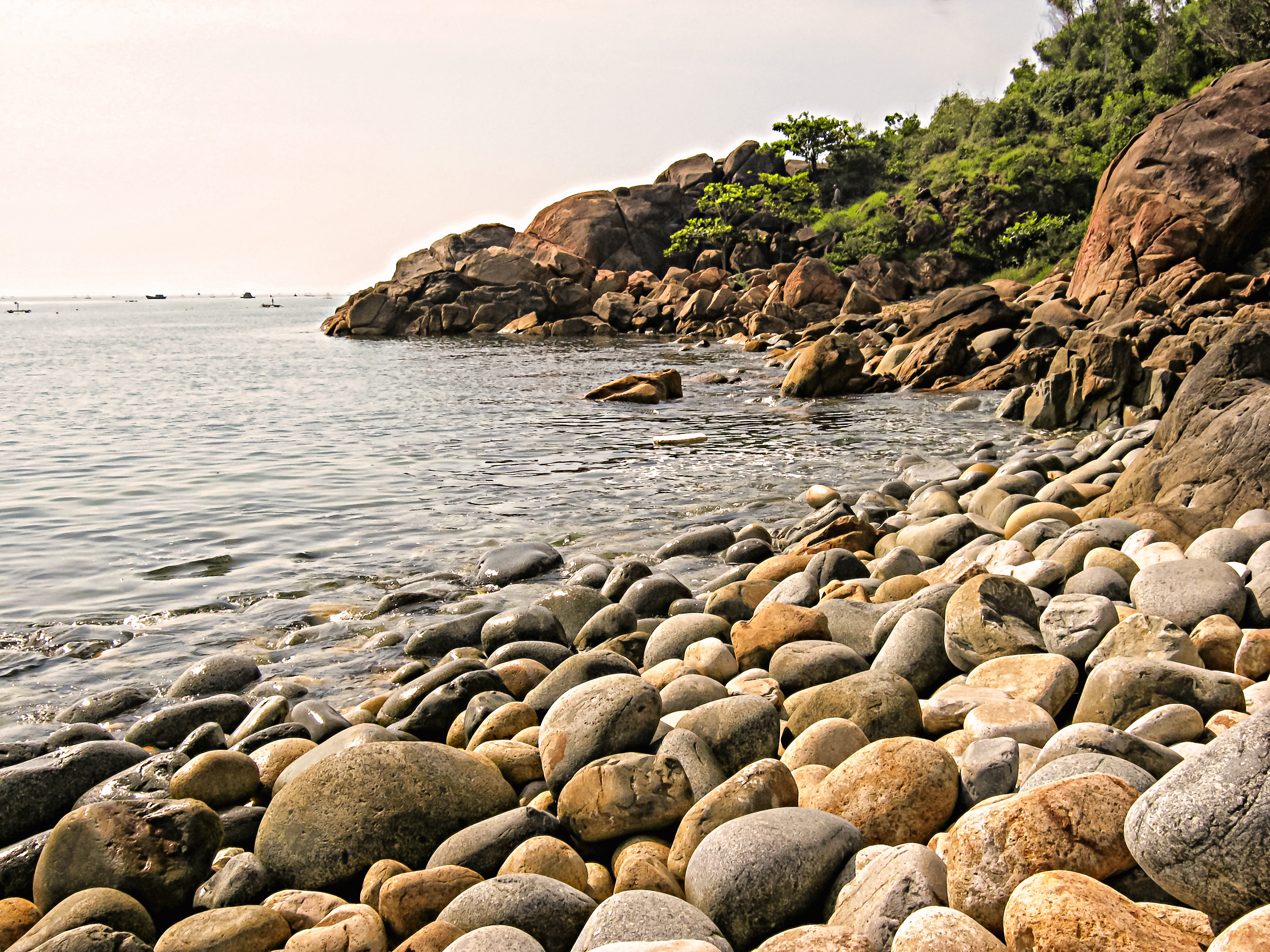
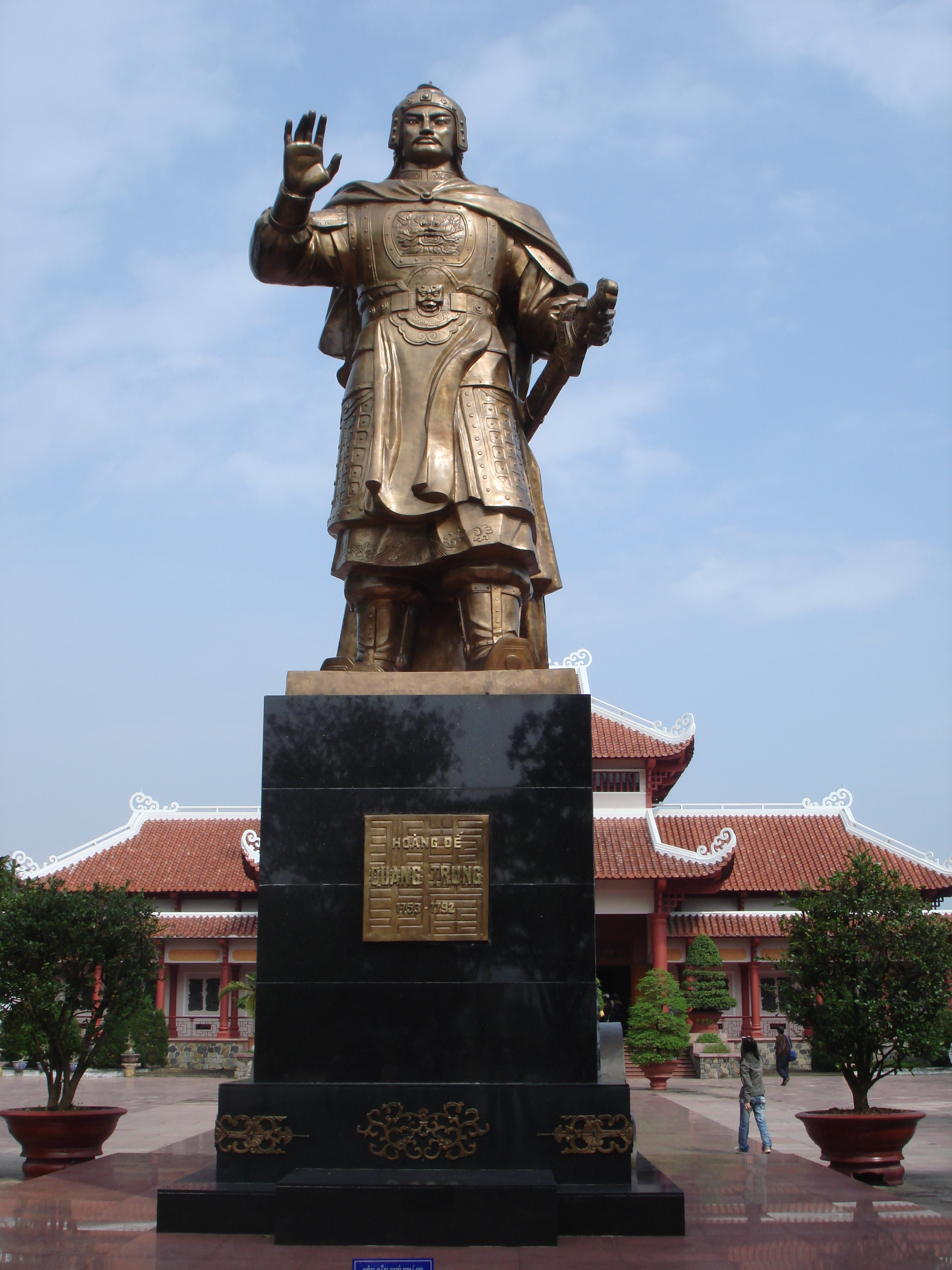
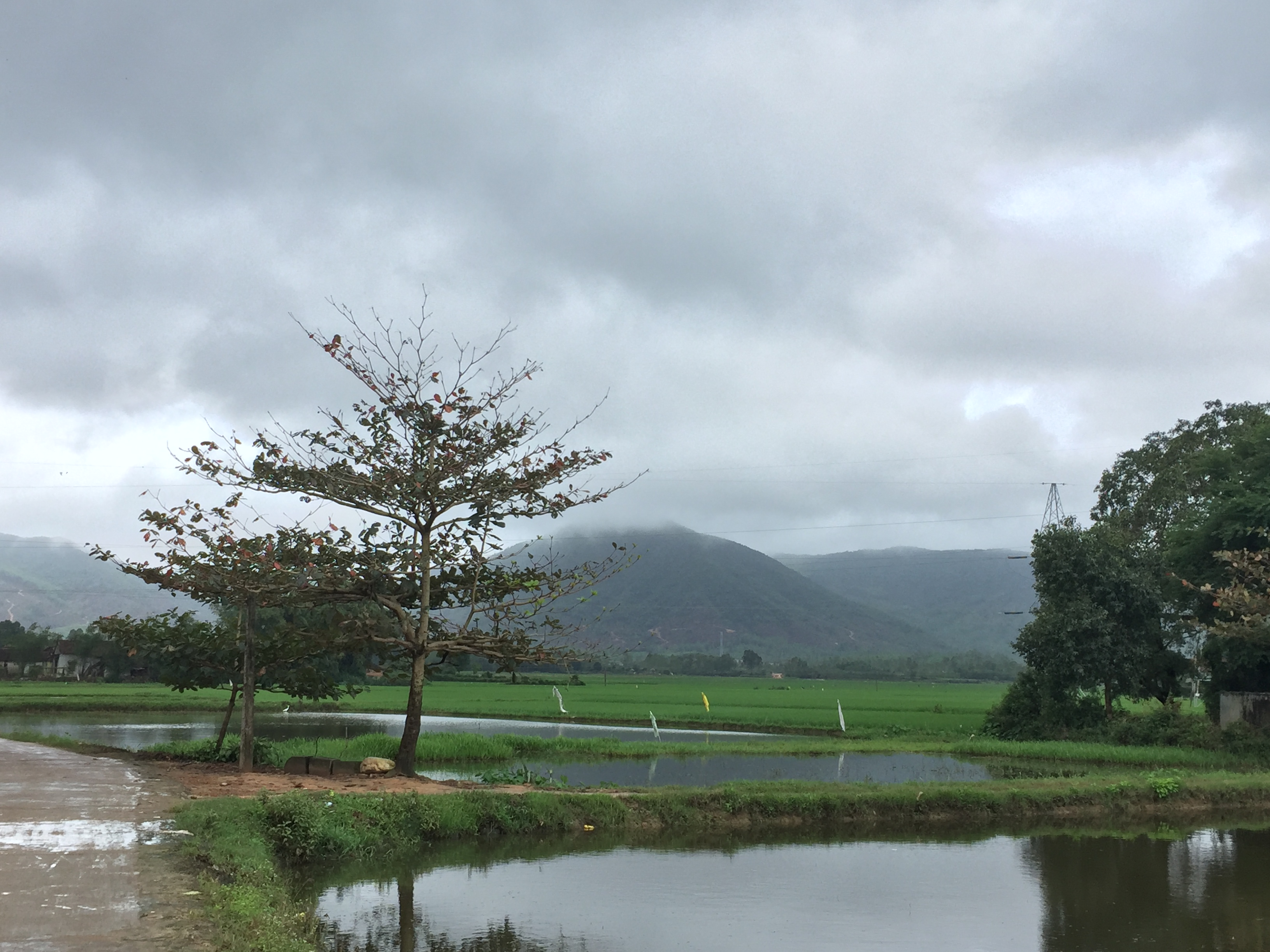
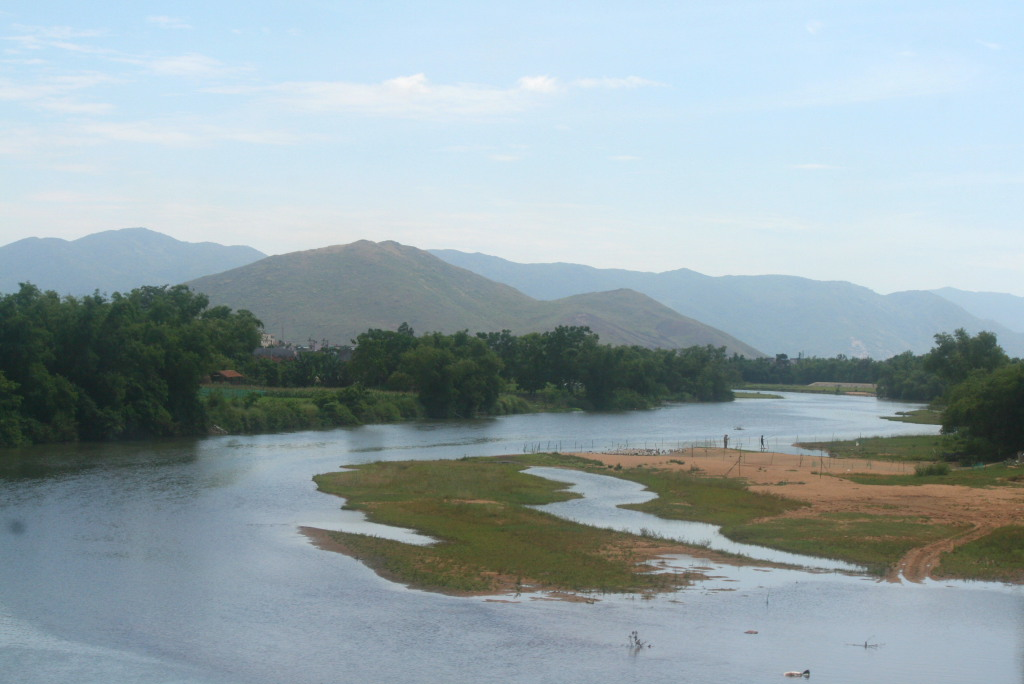
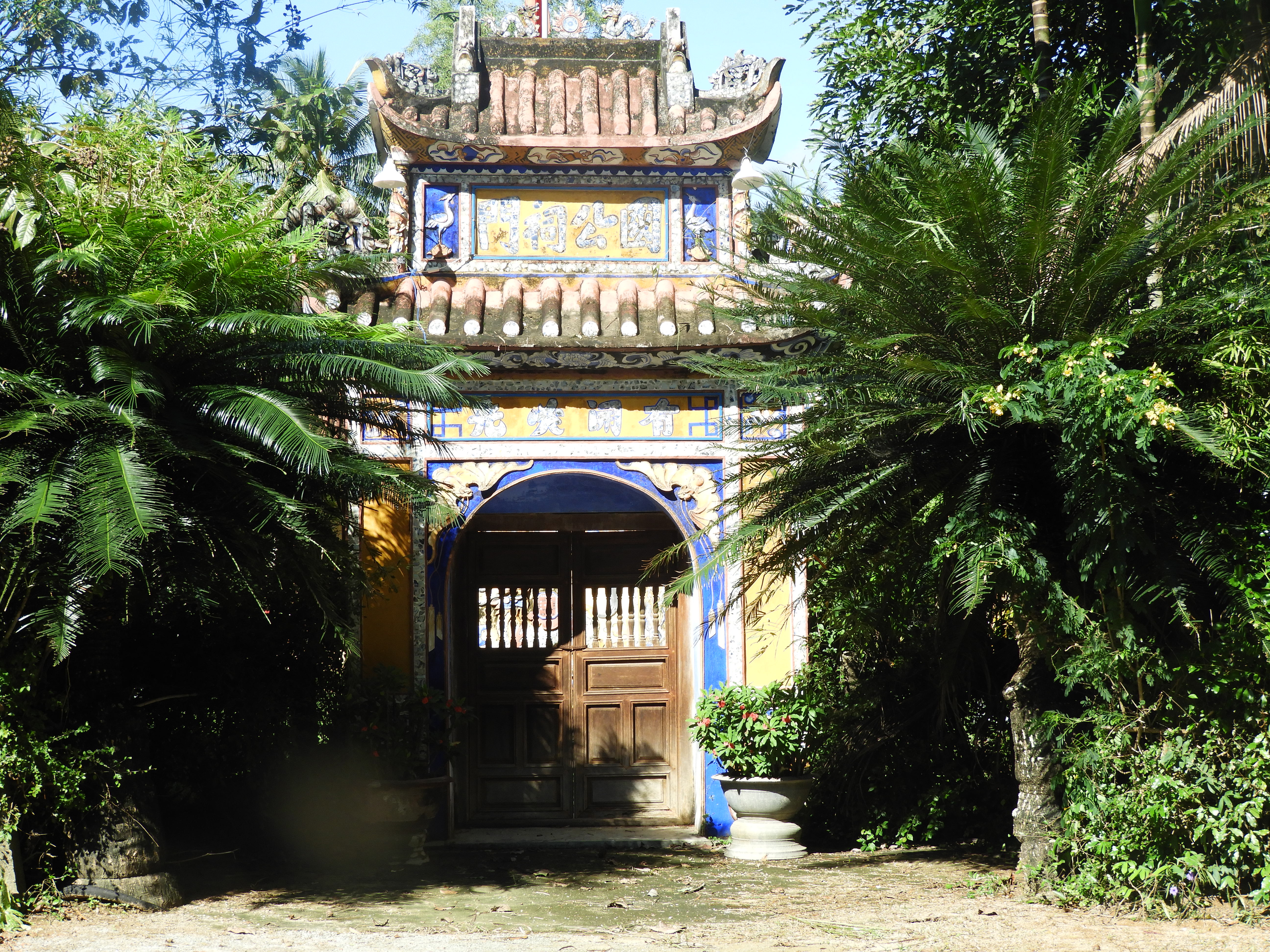
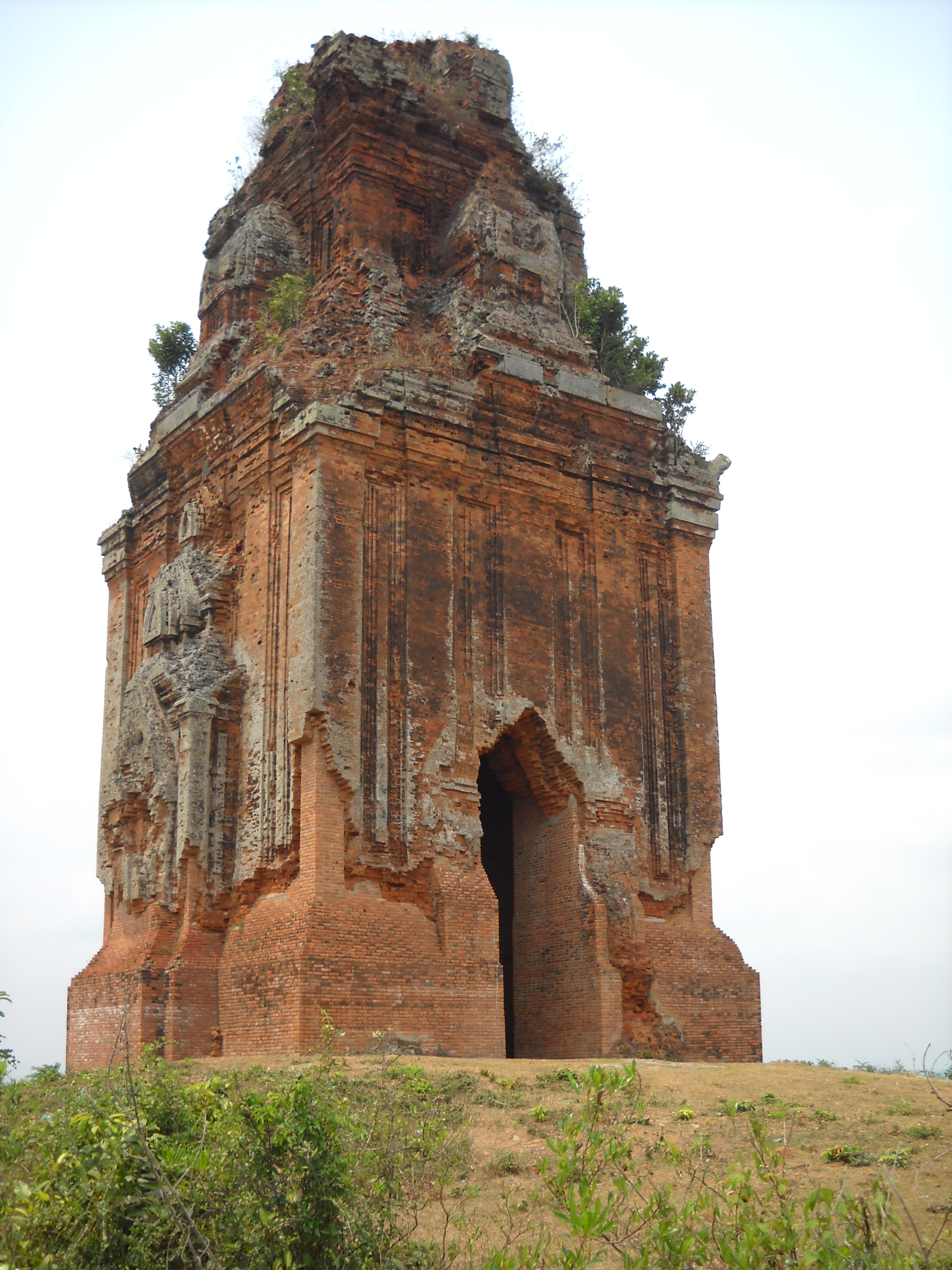
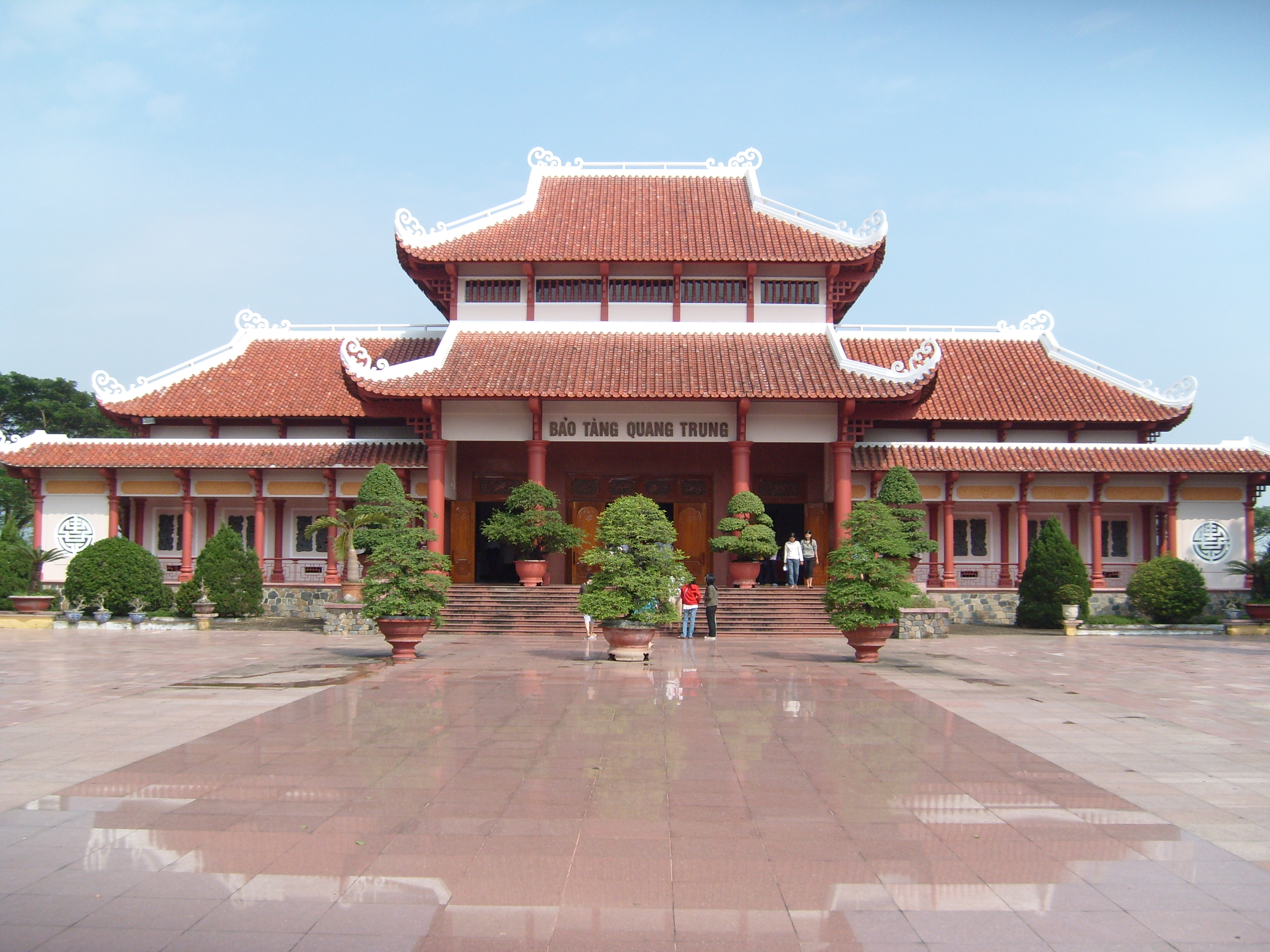
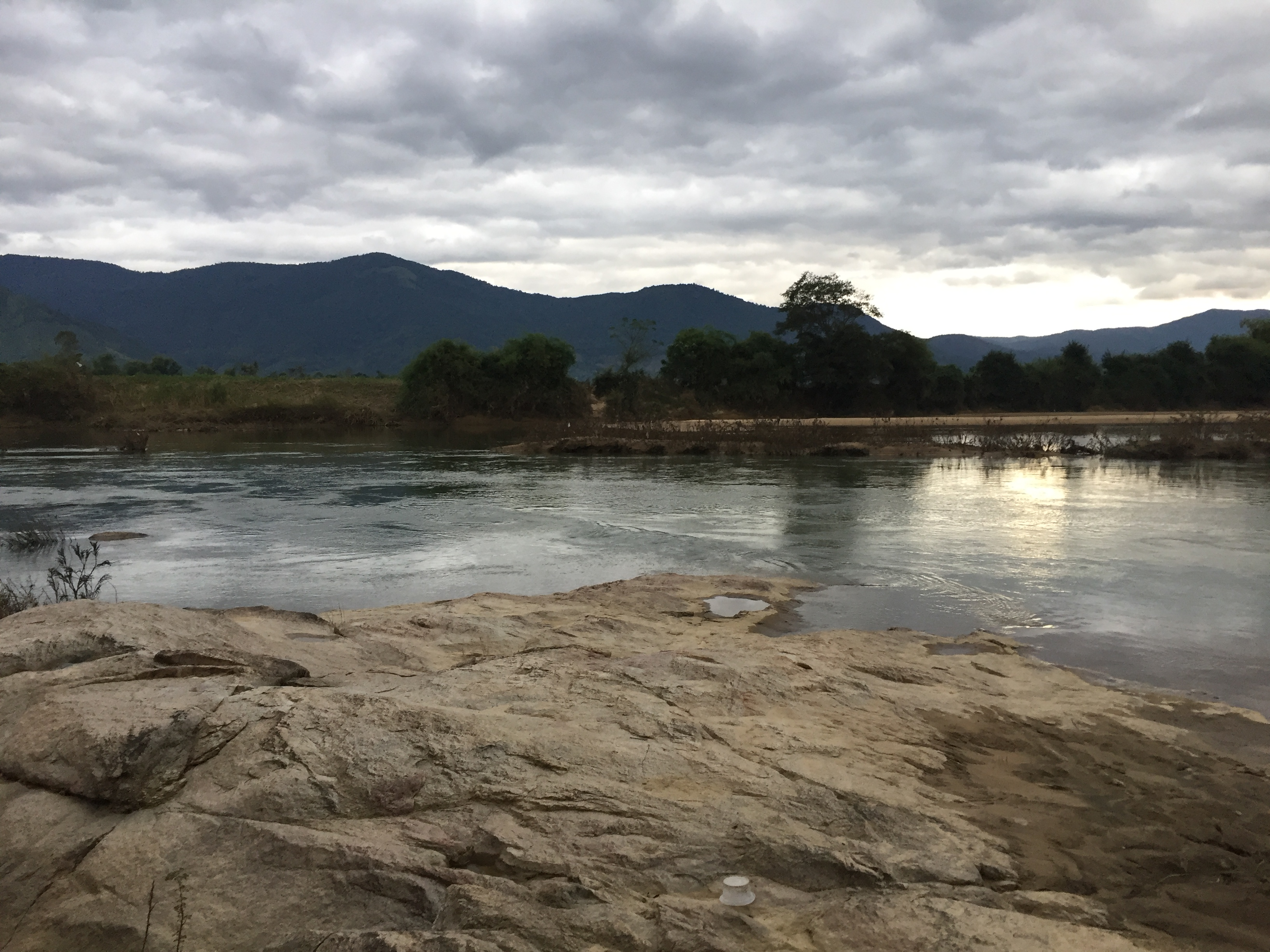
- From top; left to right: Quy Nhon city • Quy Nhơn beach • Egg Stone Beach • Quang Trung statue • Quy Nhơn river • Scenery • Nhà thờ họ of Đào Duy Từ family • Phú Lốc tower • Quang Trung museum • Tây Sơn river

- Seal

- Location of Bình Định province within Vietnam
- Coordinates: 14°10′N 109°0′E
- Country: Vietnam
- Region: South Central Coast
- Capital: Quy Nhơn

Government
  - People's Council Chair: Nguyễn Xuân Dương
  - People's Committee Chair: Vũ Hoàng Hà

Area
  - Total: 6,066.40 km^{2} (2,342.25 sq mi)

Population (2025)
  - Total: 1,813,101
  - Density: 298.876/km^{2} (774.085/sq mi)

Demographics
  - Ethnicities: Vietnamese, Chăm, Bahnar, H're

GDP
  - Total: VND 130.800 trillion US$ 5.556 billion
- Time zone: UTC+07:00 (ICT)
- Area codes: 56 (until 16 July 2017); 256 (from 17 June 2017)
- ISO 3166 code: VN-31
- HDI (2020): ▲0.722 (26th)
- Website: www.binhdinh.gov.vn

Bình Định was formerly a northern coastal province in the South Central Coast region, the Central of Vietnam. It borders Quảng Ngãi to the north, Phú Yên to the south, Gia Lai to the west and the South China Sea to the east.

Bình Định province has an area of 6,066.40 km^{2} (2,342.25 mi^{2}), comprising 11 district-level sub-divisions, with a population of over 1.8 million people as of 2025. The province is known for its scenery and beaches. There are also a number of Cham structures. Majority of the province is covered by mountains or hills. Its capital Quy Nhon served as the capital of the historic Tây Sơn dynasty. Economically the province has the most productive primary sector in the South Central Coast region, mostly because of its large output of rice, coconuts and its strong livestock, forestry and fishing sectors.

On June 12, 2025, Bình Định was incorporated into Gia Lai province.

== History ==
=== Champa ===
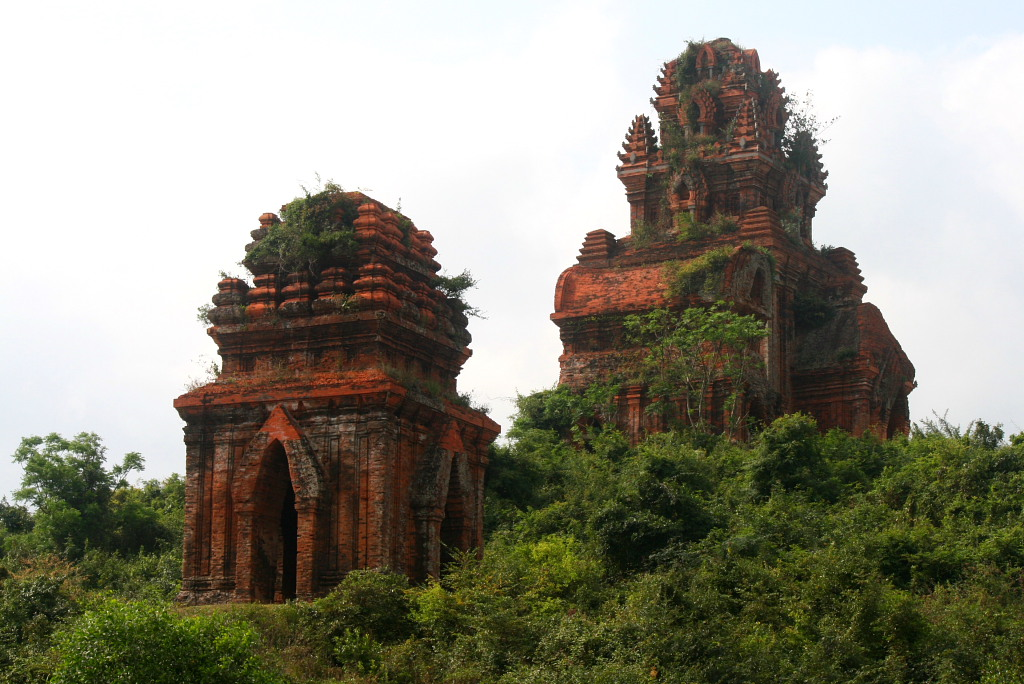
Cham towers

Bình Định was probably one of the places where the Cham first arrived in what is now Vietnam. Its favourable geography led to the rise of the Cham Port of Thị Nại where Quy Nhơn is now located. The city-state of Vijaya was located around this port and the main city, which was further inland. Its centre was in the southern lowland of Bình Định. However, its architecture implies that it did not become important until the eleventh or twelfth century.

Vijaya's architecture also distinguishes it from other Champa centers, since it used a combination of stone and brick elements, while most other Cham structures only used bricks. This suggests some influence from Cambodian Angkor. It also points to the relative abundance of labour in Vijaya compared to other Champa centres of power, because processing stones for construction was more labour-intensive than the production of bricks.

Vijaya was involved in various wars with neighbouring countries. Major wars were fought with Angkor (now Cambodia) in the 12th and 13th centuries. Around this time Vijaya seems to have been associated with, and at times even dominated by, the Khmer King Jayavarman VII. Major wars with Vietnam were fought in 1069 and again in the 15th century, which eventually led to the defeat of Vijaya and the demise of Champa in 1471.

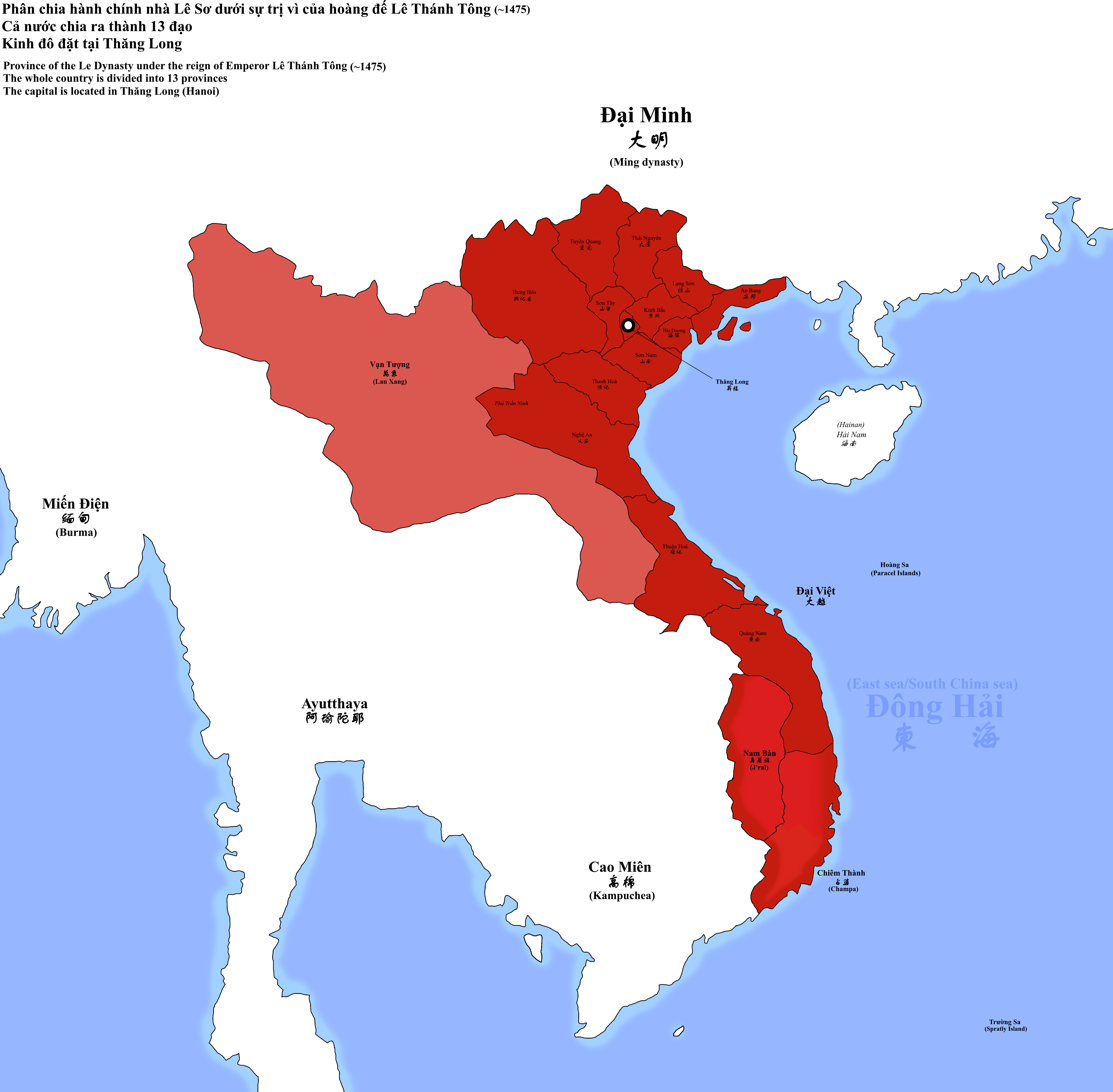
Đại Việt under King Lê Thánh Tông

In 1471, following a decisive victory over Champa, King Lê Thánh Tông reoccupied Hóa Châu, annexed the lands of Chiêm Động, Đồ Bàn, Đại Chiêm, and Cổ Lũy to establish Quảng Nam protectorate (Đạo Quảng Nam) with three prefectures: Thăng Hoa, Tư Nghĩa, and Hoài Nhân (today Quảng Nam, Quảng Ngãi, and Bình Định provinces respectively). In the year Canh Tuất (1490), Lê Thánh Tông divided the country into 13 Regions (Xứ), with Hoài Nhân of Quảng Nam was the southernmost prefecture.

=== Tây Sơn Dynasty ===
The Tây Sơn dynasty originated from Binh Dinh, being named after Tây Sơn district where the rulers had come from. The capital of Quy Nhon served as their capital until the Vietnamese Civil War of 1789–1802, when the province was wracked by warfare and the dynasty collapsed.

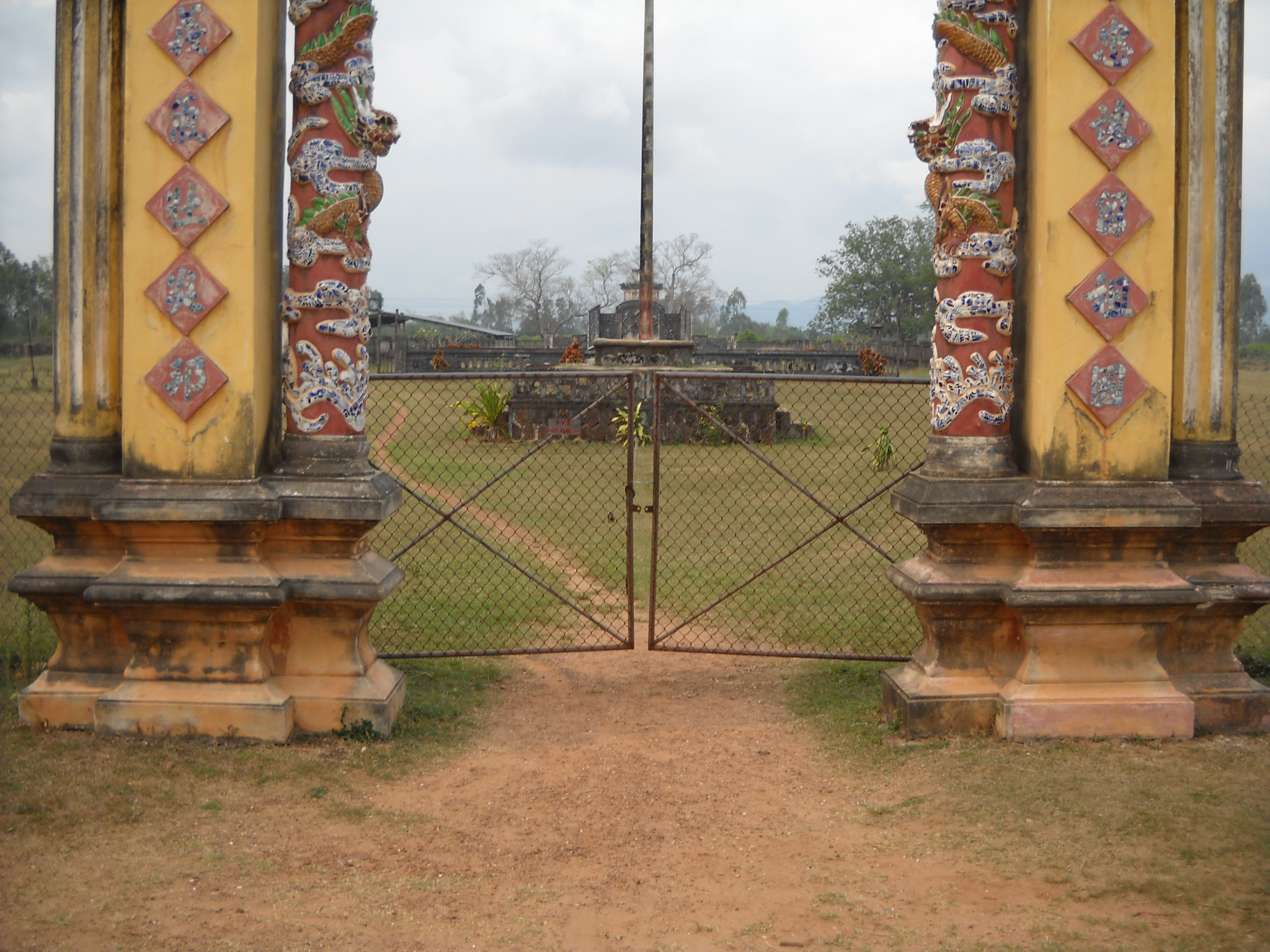
Ruin of main gate of Tây Sơn dynasty's palace.

Its Sino-Vietnamese name (chữ Hán: 平定) translates as "pacified" or "subjugated".

=== Nguyễn dynasty ===
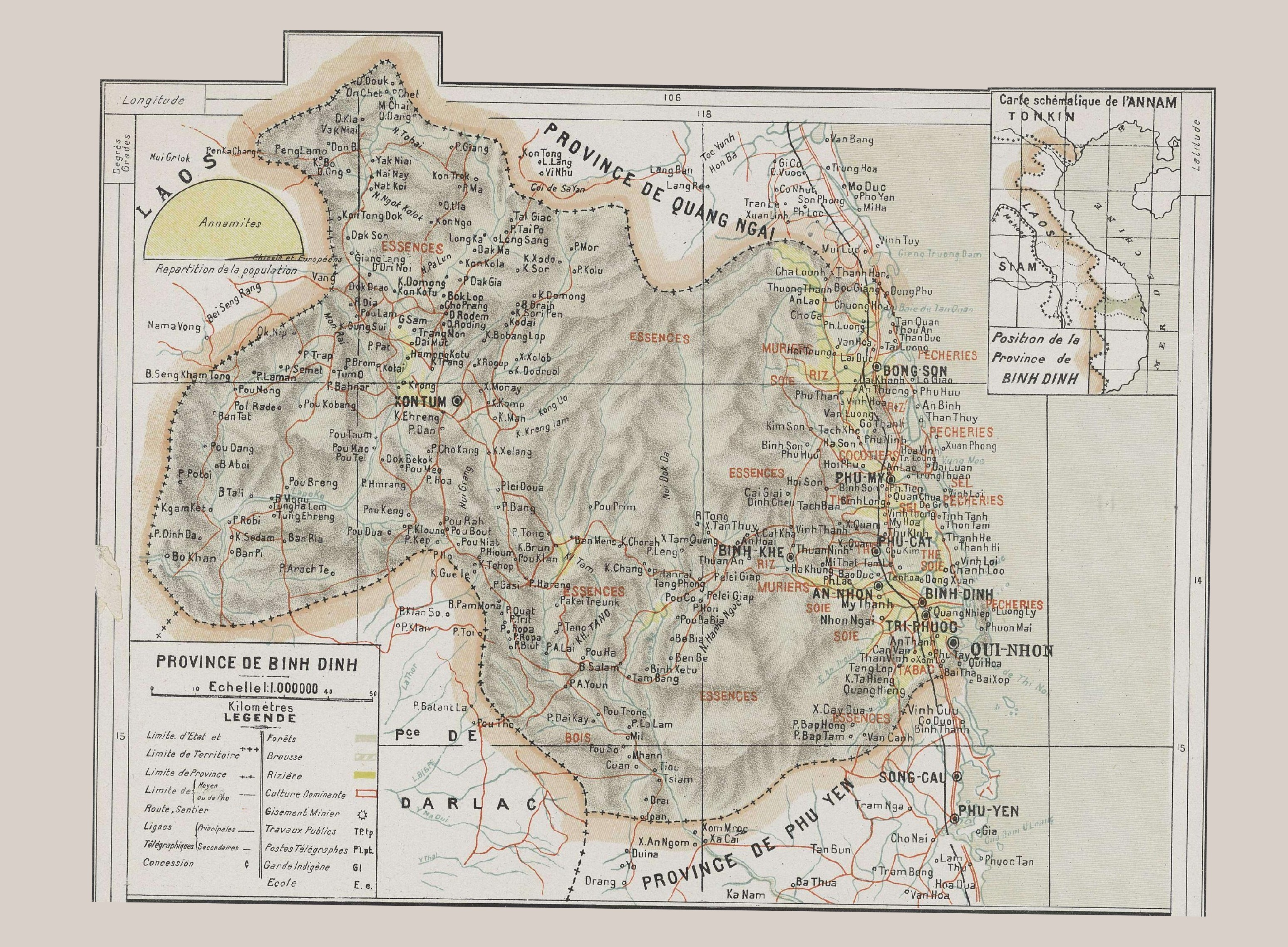
Map of Binh Dinh province in 1909

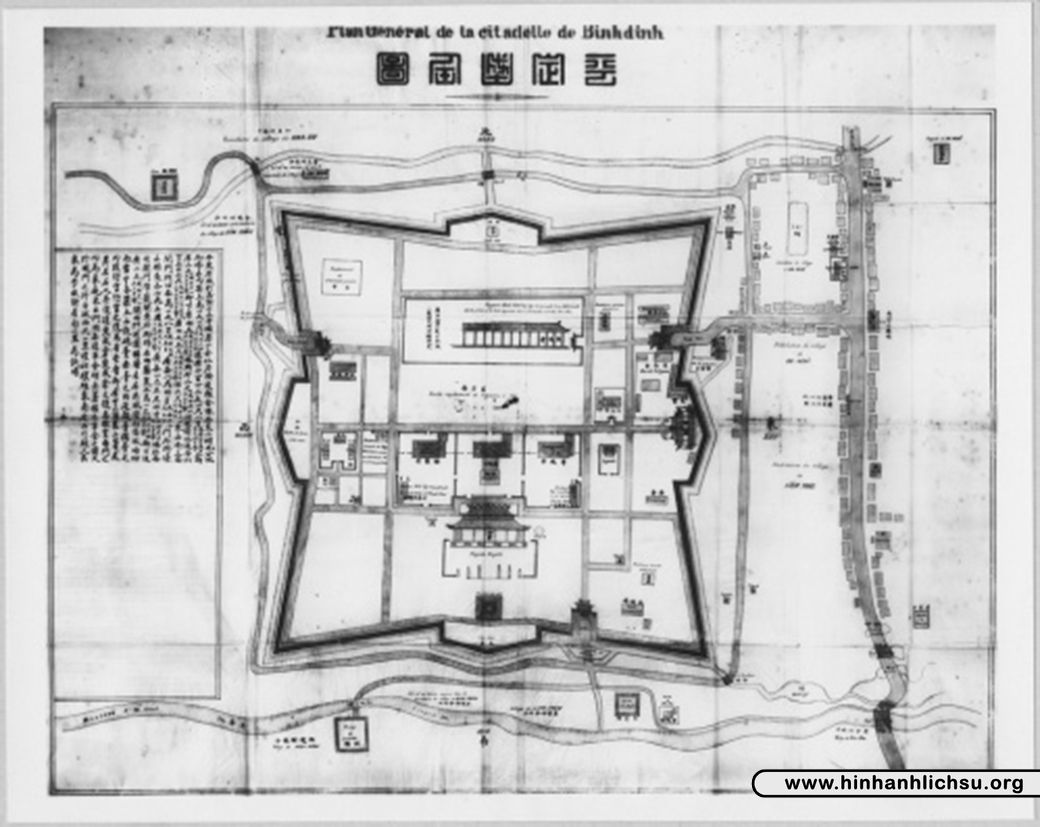
Drawing of Đồ Bàn citadel in 1913

=== Republic of Vietnam ===
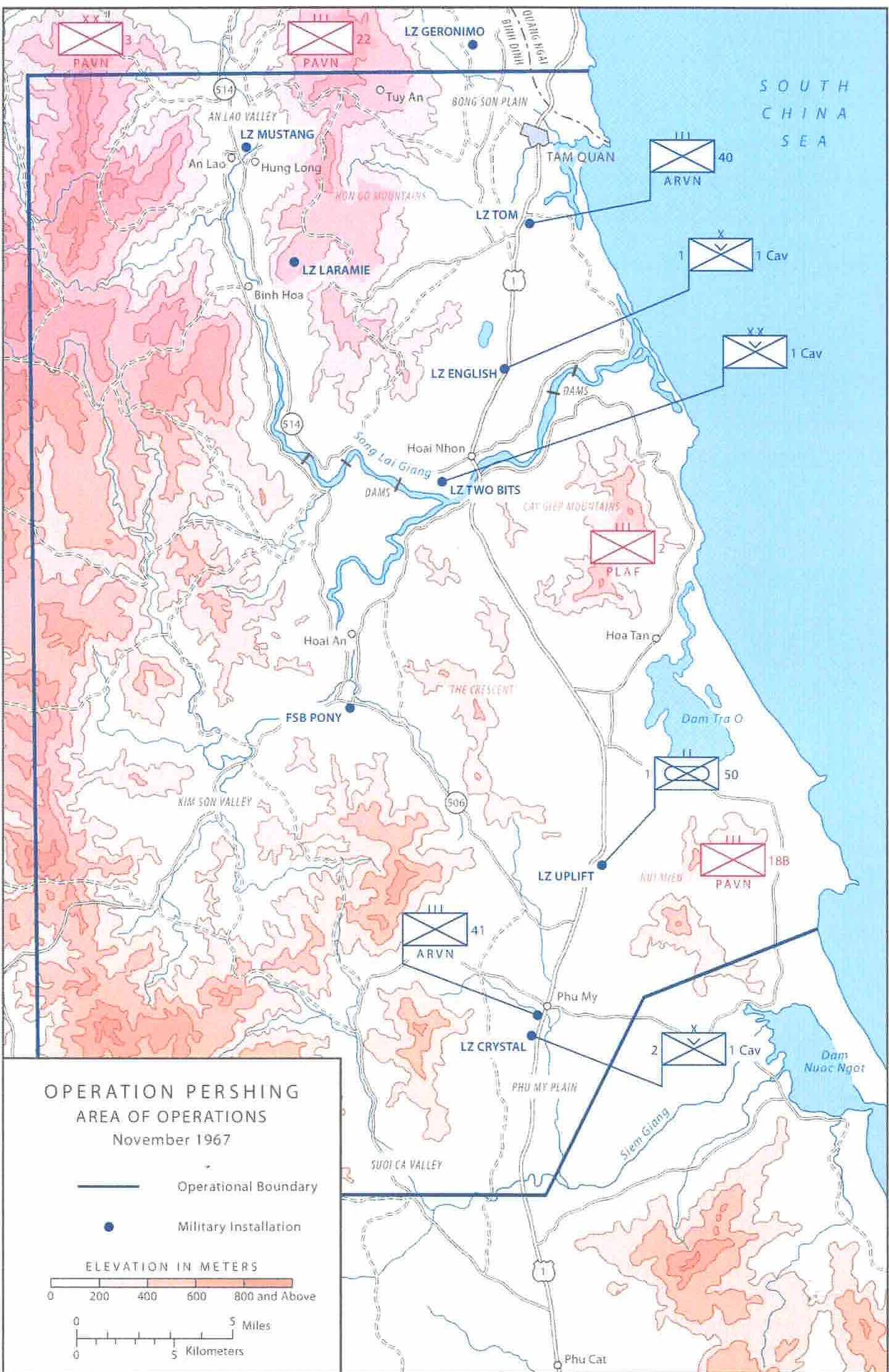
Pershing Area of Operations, Nov. 1967

During the Vietnam War, Bình Định was the site of heavy fightings between the US Army 1st Cavalry Division, the ROK Army Capital Division, and the ARVN 22nd Infantry Division against the PAVN 3rd Division (Sao Vàng), such as Operation Masher, Operation Thayer, Battle of Tam Quan, and Operation Pershing in 1966 - 1968.

=== After Reunification Day ===
In February 1976, Bình Định and Quảng Ngãi provinces were merged into one new province called Nghĩa Bình. It was re-partitioned on 30 June 1989 into its previous components.

On 12 June 2025, as part of major nationwide reforms, Bình Định province was dissolved and merged with Gia Lai province.

== Geography ==
=== Topography ===
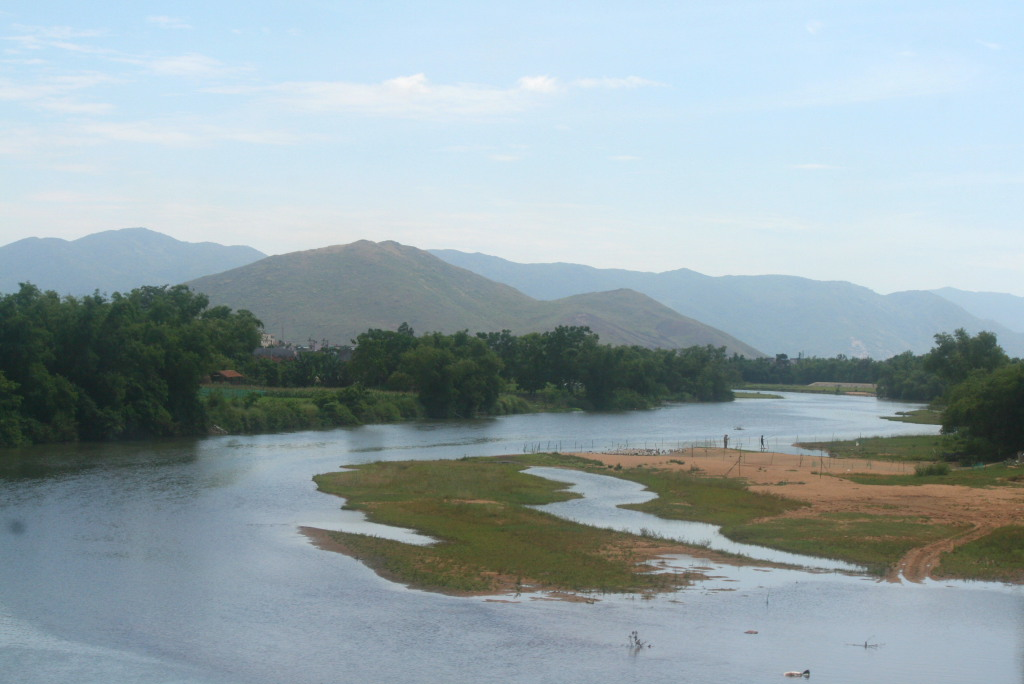

The majority of Bình Định province is covered by mountains or hills. Elevations range from 0 at the coast to around 1200 meters above sea level in An Lão district in the north-west of the province. While most of the mountains as well as the highest peaks are in the west, there are mountains throughout the province, even near the coast. Most districts of Bình Định have a topography that is a mix of mountains or hills and lowlands. The districts of An Lão in the north-west, Vĩnh Thạnh in the west, and Vân Canh in the south-west are mostly mountainous. All other districts have some lowlands.

The largest lowland area is located in the south of the province along the lower Côn River. It encompasses much of Quy Nhon, the districts of Tuy Phước, An Nhơn, the western part of Phù Cát, and the eastern part of Tây Sơn. Given its size, and the access to a major port as well as Bình Định's major river, it has long been the place where most of Bình Định's people and economic activities concentrate. It was the site of Vijaya, one of the major city-states of Champa. The majority of Bình Định's population lives in the districts around this plain.

Other lowland areas are located in the coastal districts of Hoài Nhơn, Phù Mỹ, Phù Cát, as well as the inland district of Hoài Ân. There are some hills or mountains near the coast in all of the coastal provinces, with the highest peak in Phù Cát at 874m (Ba mountain, núi Bà) and in Phù Mỹ at 602m.

Mountains form natural borders to the neighbouring provinces. Cù Mông pass (đèo Cù Mông) is the main border crossing to Phú Yên province. National Route 1 passes through this pass, while there is another road (1D) along the coast. The border to Gia Lai province is the most mountainous, with the only road connection at An Khê pass (đèo An Khê) between the towns of Phú Phong in Tây Sơn district and An Khê in Gia Lai. The border to Quảng Ngãi province is also very mountainous, with the major road and railway passing through Bình Đê Pass (đèo Bình Đê) near Tam Quan.

=== Hydrography ===
The Côn River is the largest and most important river in Bình Định. It forms a small delta north of Quy Nhon. Most of it can be used as an inland waterway for transportation. This is probably one of the reasons why a major centre of power of Champa emerged along this river. Other rivers are Lại Giang River at the centre of the lowland areas of Hoài Nhơn and Hoài Ân in northern Bình Định, Mỹ Cát River in central Bình Định, and Hà Thanh River along the valley in Vân Canh district in southern Bình Định.

The largest lake is Định Bình Lake, an artificial lake mainly used for irrigation in the highlands of western Bình Định. Also in western Bình Định is Vĩnh Sơn Lake (hồ Vĩnh Sơn) at Vĩnh Sơn Hydropower Station. Other major lakes include Núi Một Lake (hồ Núi Một) in the south and Hội Sơn Lake (hồ Hội Sơn) in the centre of the province.

=== Mineral resources ===
Ilmenite reserves in Phù Cát and graphite reserves in northern Bình Định are substantial and support significant local export industries. There is also some gold in western Bình Định.

== Administrative divisions ==
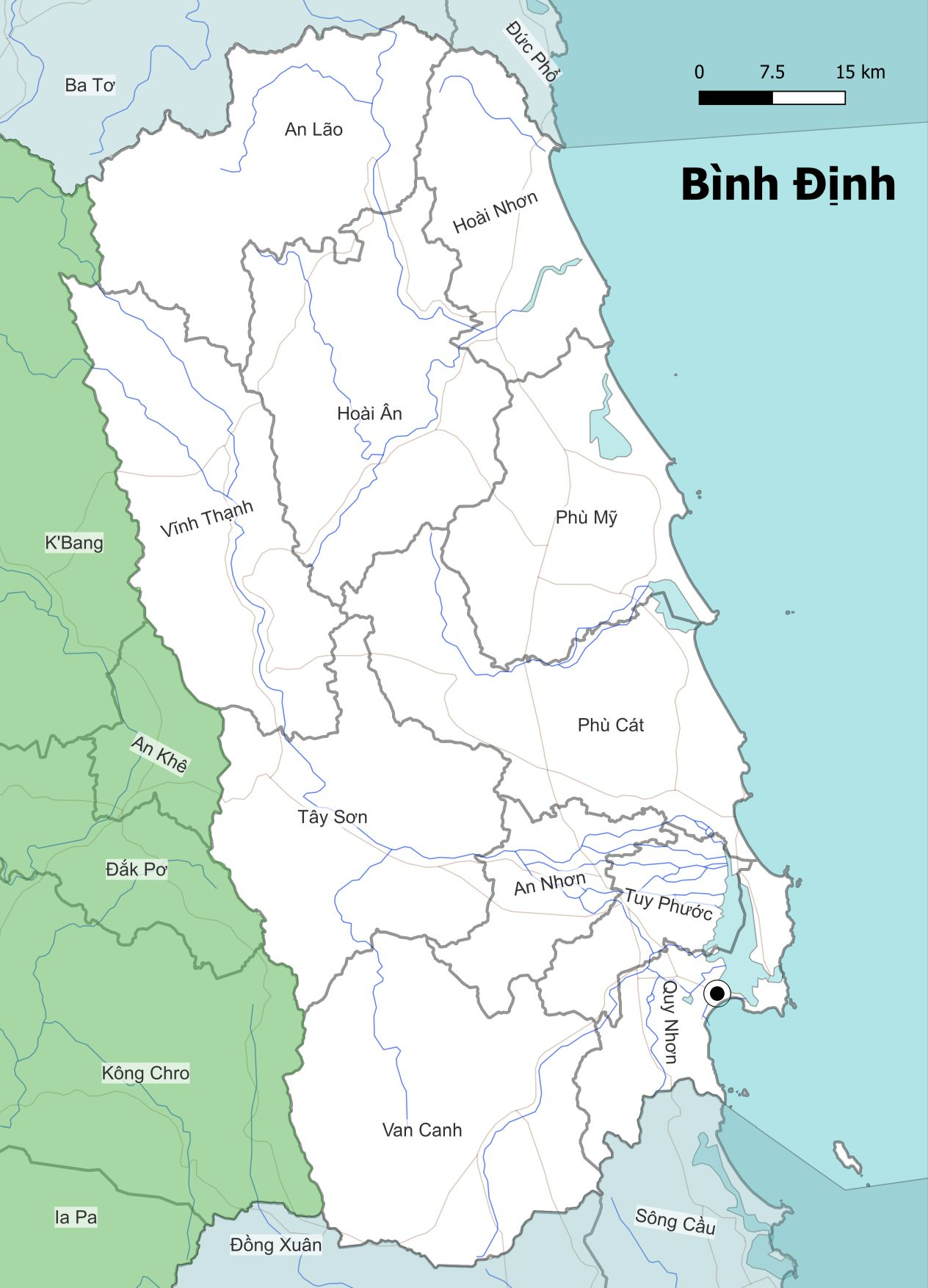
Bình Định province districts

Bình Định is subdivided into 11 district-level sub-divisions:

- 8 districts:

- An Lão
- Hoài Ân
- Phù Cát
- Phù Mỹ
- Tuy Phước
- Tây Sơn
- Vân Canh
- Vĩnh Thạnh

- 2 district-level town:
  - An Nhơn
  - Hoài Nhơn
- 1 provincial city:
  - Quy Nhon (capital)

They are further subdivided into 12 commune-level towns (or townlets), 115 communes, and 28 wards.

== Economy ==
With a gross domestic product per capita of 9.57 million đồngs in 2007, Bình Định is ranked fourth out of eight provinces and cities in the South Central Coast. While being significantly behind the main success stories of the region, namely Da Nang and Khánh Hòa province, it is more developed than most other provinces in the region. It has been benefiting from its strategic position as one of the main gateways to the Central Highlands and its port. It is the region's third-largest industrial center (mainly based on furniture manufacturing) and also has strong agricultural, forestry, livestock, and fishing sectors.

In 2007 Bình Định exported goods worth US$327.3 million, while importing goods worth US$141.6 million. Most of the province's exports are furniture.

=== Agriculture, forestry, fishing ===
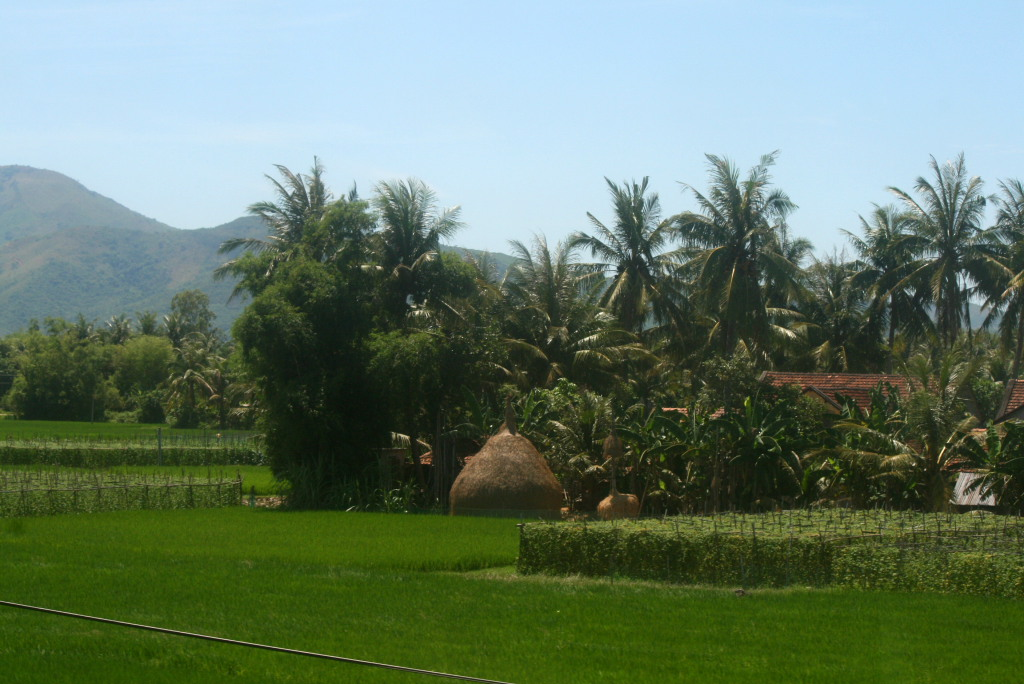
Farm in Bình Định

Bình Định has the most productive primary sector (agriculture, fishery, forestry) in the South Central Coast region, mostly because of its large output of rice, coconuts and its strong livestock, forestry and fishing sectors. It contributes roughly 23% of sector 1 GDP and rice output of the South Central Coast (while it has 17.7% of the region's population). The rice harvest is the largest of the South Central Coast region but accounts only for a modest 1.62% of the national output. It has been fluctuating around 600,000t over the last few years. The average yield is 53.1t/ha as of 2009 with the highest yields around the lower Côn River.

The province's output of coconuts (95,040t) accounts for 9% of the national total as of 2007. Other significant crops include peanuts (13.7kt, 2.71%), cashew nuts (4.2kt, 1.39%), and sugar cane (185.7kt, 1.07%). Coconuts are planted mostly in the districts of Hoài Nhơn (30kt in 2009), Phù Mỹ (27kt), Phù Cát (16.4kt), and Hoài Ân (15.7kt).

The livestock sector makes up 35% of the agricultural gross output, a relatively high value compared to other provinces. Bình Định is by far the largest producer of pork, both in terms of total output and per capita output (over 50 kg per capita). As of 2009, there were 684,300 pigs, 288,400 cows, 18,900 buffaloes, 3 million chickens and 2 million other poultry.

Bình Định has a large fishing sector. Its gross output contributes one fifth of the South Central Coast's total, ranking second after Khánh Hòa province (as of 2007). In 2009 gross output was 3.97 trillion VND or 137,466t. In contrast to Khánh Hòa, the vast majority of this was contributed by sea fishing, with only a small share (11.1%) from aquaculture. As of 2009, 61,900 people were employed in fishing, compared to 481,200 in agriculture and forestry.

=== Industry ===
Bình Định has transformed itself into a regional center of furniture manufacturing. The industry has been successful in creating large numbers of jobs, with furniture manufacturing enterprises employing around 40,000 workers and manufacturing in total around 107,000, making Bình Định leading in the South Central Coast in terms of industrial employment. More than two thirds of the province's gross industrial output is produced in Quy Nhơn, which is the region's third-largest industrial center after Da Nang and Nha Trang. Phu Tai Industrial Park is central to Bình Định's industry in general and the furniture industry in particular. Several chemical enterprises that supply the furniture and wood processing industry have been set up in the vicinity of the industrial park.

The largest industries after furniture manufacturing (5290.8 billion VND in 2009) in terms of gross output are food products and beverages (2770.5 billion), non-metallic mineral products (938.4 billion), wood processing (843.6 billion), and chemical products (755.1 billion). The latter includes not only companies supporting the furniture industry, but also a pharmaceutical industry, the most significant company of which is Bidiphar, a local state-owned enterprise. Smaller manufacturing sectors include garments, paper, leather, plastics and rubber products.

Nhơn Hội Economic Zone is under construction, but behind schedule (as of September 2010).

== Infrastructure and transport ==
=== Transport infrastructure ===
Bình Định's infrastructure has been significant for its economic development. It has traditionally been the site of a major port and the intersection of two national roads has further increased Bình Định's role as a gateway to the Central Highlands and access to the latter's resources. As a result, the province has received one of the highest infrastructure scores in the Provincial Competitiveness Index 2009, second only to Da Nang in central Vietnam.

==== Roads ====
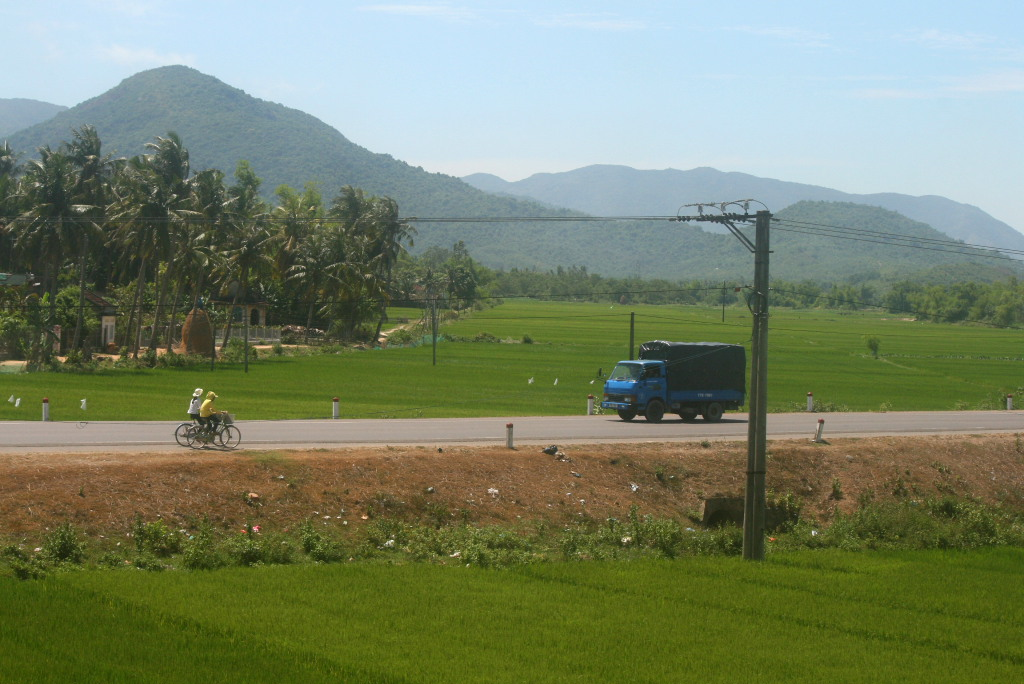
National Route 1

There are national roads with a total length of 208 km and provincial roads a total length of 458.5 km. National Route 1 runs through the province from north to south with a length of 118 km, connecting the eastern districts of Hoài Nhơn, Phù Mỹ, Phù Cát, An Nhơn, and Tuy Phước to much of the rest of Vietnam. A branch of it – National Route 1D – connects the provincial capital Quy Nhon to 1A and Sông Cầu in Phú Yên province. 20 km of 1D's 33 km are in Bình Định. National Road 19 runs from Quy Nhơn Port through northern Quy Nhơn, the towns of Tuy Phước, Phú Phong to An Khê, Pleiku and Lệ Thanh border gate in Gia Lai province. This direct link from Quy Nhon to the Central Highlands and the border to Cambodia has been important for Bình Định's role as a gateway to the highlands and its industrial development, since especially the wood processing and furniture industry has relied on raw materials from the highlands, Cambodia and Laos. 70 km of National Route 19 are located in Bình Định.

74.6 percent of roads in Bình Định (including national, provincial, and district roads) are paved, which is relatively good by Vietnamese standards and significantly above the median province with 51.44 percent. However, the assessment of road quality by the local business community is not very good, with only 34.76 percent stating that roads are in good or very good condition.

Road transport is by far the most important mode of transport within the province. It accounts for between 97 and just under 100 percent of passenger and freight movements. 22.77 million passengers and 7928 tons of cargo were transported by road in 2009.

==== Railways ====
The North–South Railway in Bình Định has a length of 134 km. All Reunification Express trains stop at Diêu Trì Railway Station. Quy Nhơn Railway Station is around 10 km east of the main railway. It is served by a daily train from Quy Nhơn to Saigon Railway Station and a train three times a week from Quy Nhon to Vinh Railway Station. Tam Quan Railway Station, located along North–South Railway in Hoài Nhơn district, is frequented by only a few trains, such as the train to Vinh.

=== Air ===
The province is served by Phu Cat Airport which is located in Phù Cát district between the towns of Ngo May and Đập Đá, around 30 kilometres (19 mi) northwest of Quy Nhơn. It provides daily direct domestic flights to Ha Noi and Ho Chi Minh City which are operated by Vietnam Airlines, VietJet Air, Bamboo Airways and Pacific Airlines.

==== Water transport ====
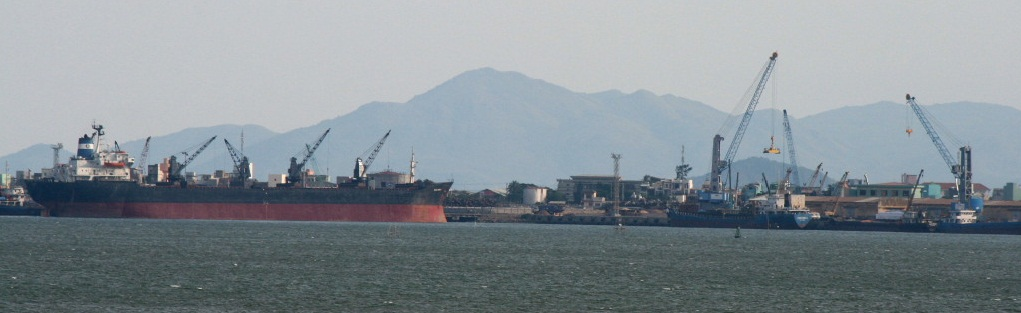
Quy Nhơn Port

Much of Côn River – almost up to the border in Vĩnh Thạnh district with Gia Lai province – and a small stretch of Lai Giang River up to Bồng Sơn in Hoài Nhơn district – are inland waterways and can be used for transportation. There has been a significant change in the use of inland waterways away from passengers and towards freight traffic between 2006 and 2008. The number of passengers decreased from 113,000 in 2006 to 42,000 in 2007 and 7,000 in 2008 and 2009, while freight transport on inland – apparently almost non-existent until 2008 – has accounted for 10 tons and around 70 tons km in 2008 and 2009, respectively. This is, however, still minuscule compared to other modes of transportation within the province. Maritime transport within the province has shown a declining trend in recent years and was at 171 tons and 31,000 passengers in 2009. The two main ports of the province – Quy Nhơn Port and Thị Nại Port – are both located in Quy Nhon. In 2009 they had a combined freight turnover of 4,500 tons, with 30,856 tons handled by Quy Nhon port, including 2016 tons of exported goods (mainly processed wood, furniture and stones). Thị Nại Port, in contrast, mostly handles domestic trade. The volume of cargo handled has increased by more than 50 percent between 2005 and 2009.

==== Ownership structure ====
While Vietnam Railways and the major seaports are owned and operated by the state sector, almost none of the local transport is state-run. Household businesses are dominant in the passenger sector, accounting for more than 70 percent of passengers and passenger kilometers over the last few years – although their share has been decreasing. The other traditionally significant enterprise form have been collective enterprises. Their share has been decreasing, too, while private sector participation has been increasing from a very low base since 2008. As of 2009, the share of the collective sector (11.8 percent) is still slightly ahead of the private sector (11.6 percent), but it has been clearly overtaken in terms of passenger km, with shares of 5.4 and 23.3 percent, respectively. The freight transport sector is dominated by the household and private sector. While household businesses take the lead in freight volume (54.8 percent compared to 41.4 percent), private companies have a larger share if distance travelled (tons.km) is considered (50 percent compared to 43.4 percent). Both private and household businesses have been able to grow and increase their share in recent years, mainly at the expense of the declining collective sector.

=== Telecommunication ===
In 2009, there were 74.1 telephone subscribers per 100 inhabitants. The total number of subscriptions in the province was 1.1 million – a rapid increase from the 101,230 in 2005, most of which was contributed by mobile phones. The calling time has also increased rapidly in the same period, from 53 to 488 million minutes. The quality of telecommunications has received relatively good assessments, with 70.74 percent of respondents to a survey stating that it is good or very good. As of 2009, there were 28,919 Internet subscribers in Bình Định, up from 18,260 in 2008 and 8,716 in 2006. While telephones and Internet connections have become much more widespread, the number of letters and money telegrams sent has decreased from 119,000 in 2005 to 77,421 in 2009 and telegram services have been discontinued after 2007.

== Demography ==
Bình Định had a population of 1,813,101 on December 31, 2024. It has been growing slowly from 2000 to 2007 – at just 0.92% per year on average. As of 2009, 27.8% of the population live in urban areas, up from 19% in 1995 and 24.2% in 2000. More than 40% of the total population is concentrated in Quy Nhon and the two suburban districts of An Nhơn and Tuy Phước. There is another relatively large concentration in the northern Hoài Nhơn district with a population of 206,700 (2009) and a population density of 499/km^{2}. Population density per km^{2} in the rest of the province range from 30 to 40 in Vân Canh, An Lão, and Vĩnh Thạnh to 982 in Quy Nhon.

The eastern lowlands and Tây Sơn district are largely ethnically homogeneous. There are minorities of Bahnar people in the sparsely populated districts of An Lão, Vĩnh Thạnh and Vân Canh. Some H're people live in An Lão and some Cham in Vân Canh. Hoài Ân's population is mostly Kinh, but there are some remote communes that are dominated by Bahnar and H're people.

== Ethnic groups ==
- Kinh: 1,445,150
- Tay: 176
- Thai: 496
- Hoa: 353
- Khmer: 89
- Muong: 502
- Nung: 72
- Mong: 20
- Dao: 52
- Gia Rai: 322
- Ngai: –
- E De: 129
- Ba Na: 21,650
- Xo Dang: 88
- San Chay: 14
- Co Ho: 14
- Cham: 6,364
- San Diu: 6
- Hre: 11,112
- Mnong: 32
- Raglay: 30
- Xtieng: 3
- Bru Van Kieu: 16
- Tho: 58
- Giay: 4
- Co Tu: 37
- Gie Trieng: 39
- Ma: 12
- Kho Mu: 4
- Co: 23
- Ta Oi: 5
- Cho Ro: 6
- Khang: 1
- Xinh Mun: 1
- Ha Nhi: 2
- Chu Ru: 1
- Lao: –
- La Chi: –
- La Ha: 2
- Phu La: –
- La Hu: –
- Lu: –
- Lo Lo: –
- Chut: 1
- Mang: –
- Pa Then: –
- Co Lao: 5
- Cong: –
- Bo Y: 1
- Si La: –
- Pu Peo: –
- Brau: –
- O Du: –
- Ro Mam: 1
- Nguoi Nuoc Ngoai: 25
- Khong Xac Dinh: –

== Sights ==
A number of towers built by the Cham are now significant tourist attractions in Bình Định. The province's Tây Sơn district is also famous as the starting place of the Tây Sơn Uprising (and thus the Tây Sơn dynasty). The Quang Trung Museum commemorates the event.

== Sport ==
Traditional martial arts practiced in Binh Dinh (Võ thuật Bình Định) has become a cultural heritage.

Football

Binh Dinh Football Club based in Quy Nhon plays in the top tier of Vietnamese football, the V.League 1. Their home stadium is Quy Nhơn Stadium which has a capacity of 25,000.
