= Tuy Phước =

- Ward
- An Thuận Dam
- Interactive map of Tuy Phước
- Coordinates: 13.827270117093024°N 109.16660636909644°E
- Country: Vietnam
- Province: Gia Lai
- Established: 12 March 1987

Area
  - Total: 53.37 km^{2} (20.61 sq mi)

Population (21 October 2026)
  - Total: 78,615
  - Density: 1,451/km^{2} (3,760/sq mi)

Tuy Phước is a ward of Gia Lai province, Vietnam.

== Geography ==
Tuy Phước ward is a ward in the southeastern part of Gia Lai province, approximately 15 km northwest of Quy Nhơn and 160 km east of Pleiku. It is located in the area formerly administered by Tuy Phước district. The ward borders the following areas:

- To the east and southeast, Quy Nhơn Đông ward.
- To the south, Quy Nhơn Bắc ward.
- To the west, An Nhơn Nam ward and Tuy Phước Tây commune.
- To the north, Tuy Phước Bắc commune and Tuy Phước Đông commune.

== History ==
On 12 June 2025, the 15th National Assembly adopted Resolution No. 202/2025/QH15 on the reorganization of provincial-level administrative divisions. Under the resolution, the entire natural area and population of Gia Lai province and Bình Định province were merged to form a new province named Gia Lai.

On 16 June 2025, the Standing Committee of the National Assembly adopted Resolution No. 1664/NQ-UBTVQH15 on the reorganization of commune-level administrative divisions in Gia Lai province in 2025. Under the resolution, the entire natural area and population of Phước An and Phước Thành communes, formerly part of Tuy Phước district, were merged to form a new commune named Tuy Phước Tây.

On 21 October 2026, the 13th-term Gia Lai Provincial People's Council adopted Resolution No. 386/NQ-HĐND approving in principle the establishment of Tuy Phước ward. Tuy Phước ward was established with the same administrative boundaries as the former Tuy Phước commune, covering a natural area of 53.37 km² and having a population of 78,615.
