= Quy Nhơn Port =

Quy Nhon Port
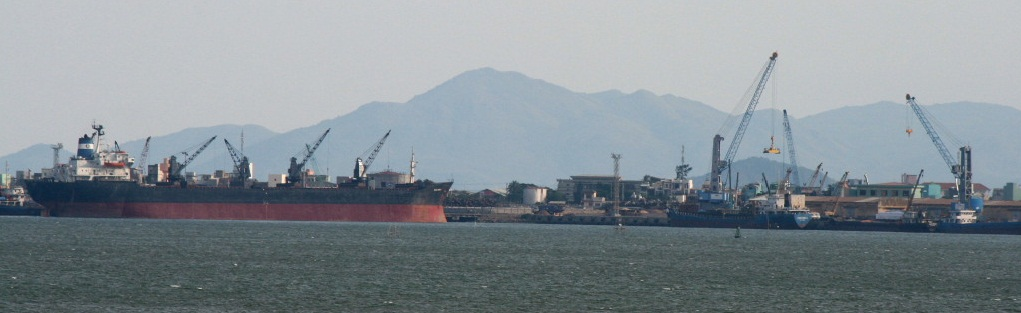
- Interactive map of Quy Nhon Port

Location
- Country: Vietnam
- Location: Quy Nhơn
- Coordinates: 13.77°N 109.23°E

Statistics
- Annual cargo tonnage: 3856 (2009)

Quy Nhơn Port (Vietnamese: Cảng Quy Nhơn) is the major port of Bình Định Province, Vietnam. It is located in Hai Cang (meaning sea port) ward at the eastern tip of Quy Nhơn city.

Quy Nhơn Port is the most accessible major port not only for Bình Định Province, but also for the Central Highlands provinces of Gia Lai and Kon Tum and even parts of Laos and Cambodia such as Attapeu Province and Ratanakiri Province. National Route 19 has its starting point at Quy Nhơn Port and leads up to Gia Lai Province and Lệ Thanh border gate on the border to Cambodia (247 km from Quy Nhơn Port). This road also connects the port to National Road 1.

	total cargo tonnage	Export	Import
2005	2450	1076	667
2006	2670	1302	641
2007	3208	1603	828
2008	3311	1525	835
2009	3856	2016	836
