= Hà Thanh River =

River in Vietnam

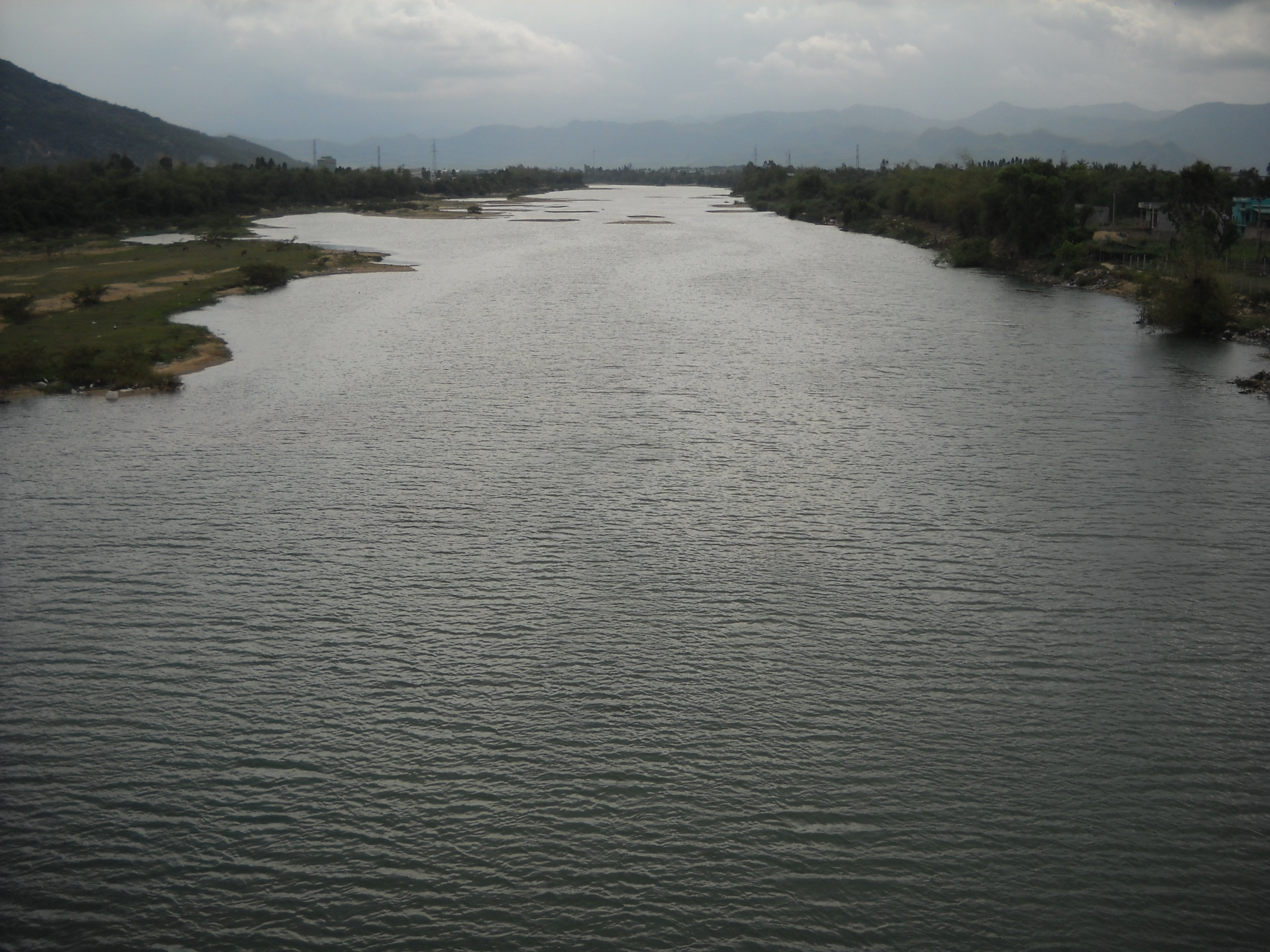
Hà Tranh River.

The Hà Thanh River (Vietnamese: Sông Hà Thanh) is a river of Vietnam. It flows through Vân Canh District in Bình Định Province for 58 kilometres.

The river starts at Ông Mountain in Vân Canh, passes through Tùy Phước before joining the Thị Nai lagoon and eventually making its way to the sea.
