= Bidiphar =

Pharmaceutical company headquartered in Quy Nhon, Vietnam

- Trade name: Binh Dinh Pharmaceutical & Medical Equipment Joint Stock Company
- Native name: Công ty Cổ phần Dược - Trang thiết bị Y tế Bình Định
- Company type: Public
- Industry: Pharmaceutical Manufacturing
- Owner: Binh Dinh People Committee

Bidiphar (also BIDIPHAR, Vietnamese: Công ty dược Trang Thiết Bị Y Tế Bình Định) is a pharmaceutical company headquartered in Quy Nhon, Vietnam. Apart from pharmaceutical products, it also produces medical equipment.

As of 2003, Bidiphar accounted for one third of Vietnam's exports in pharmaceuticals (US$2m for the whole industry).

== History ==
Bidiphar's predecessor ‘Nghia Binh Pharmaceutical Enterprise II’ was set up in 1979 and merged with another state-owned enterprise in 1995 to form Bidiphar. The company suffered from the abolition of state provision in 1988. Inputs were lacking, debts were high (at VND 250m) and the equipment obsolete. However, it was able to adjust, expanded the scale of production and diversified.

== Business outside Vietnam ==
Bidiphar was the first company from Binh Dinh Province to cooperate and invest in southern Laos - its first joint venture was set up in 1994 in Champasak Province with an investment of US$2m, of which Bidiphar contributed 80%. By 2007, Bidiphar also owned a total of 8000ha of plantations in Laos, growing rubber, coffee, and Oolong tea. As of 2010, it has a second joint venture in Laos.

While Bidiphar serves mostly Vietnam's domestic market (with 285 products authorized to be distributed nationwide) it also exports to six other countries (with 70 of its products meeting export standards. It has been relatively successful in Laos and Cambodia and has also been exploring opportunities in Myanmar.

== Joint ventures ==
Bidiphar set up a joint venture with Fresenius Kabi (Fresenius Kabi Bidiphar, FKB) in December 2008. It is managed by Fresenius Kabi and headquartered in Ho Chi Minh City, while production is based in Quy Nhon. Products include infusion therapy, clinical nutrition and generic I.V. drugs.

Bidiphar has also set up Biotan, a joint venture with a foreign company that exploits mineral resources in Binh Dinh, including gold.
