= Hoài Ân district =

Hoài Ân district Huyện Hoài Ân
- District
- Interactive map of Hoài Ân district
- Location of in Vietnam
- Coordinates: 14°20′N 108°54′E
- Country: Vietnam
- Region: South Central Coast
- Province: Bình Định
- Capital: Tăng Bạt Hổ

Area
  - Total: 750 km^{2} (290 sq mi)

Population (2024)
  - Total: 130,900
  - Density: 170/km^{2} (450/sq mi)
- Time zone: UTC+7 (Indochina Time)

Hoài Ân is a former district (huyện) of Bình Định province in the South Central Coast region of Vietnam. The district capital is at Tăng Bạt Hổ.
