= Phu Cat Airport =

Airport serving Quy Nhon, Vietnam

Phu Cat Airport Sân bay Phù Cát
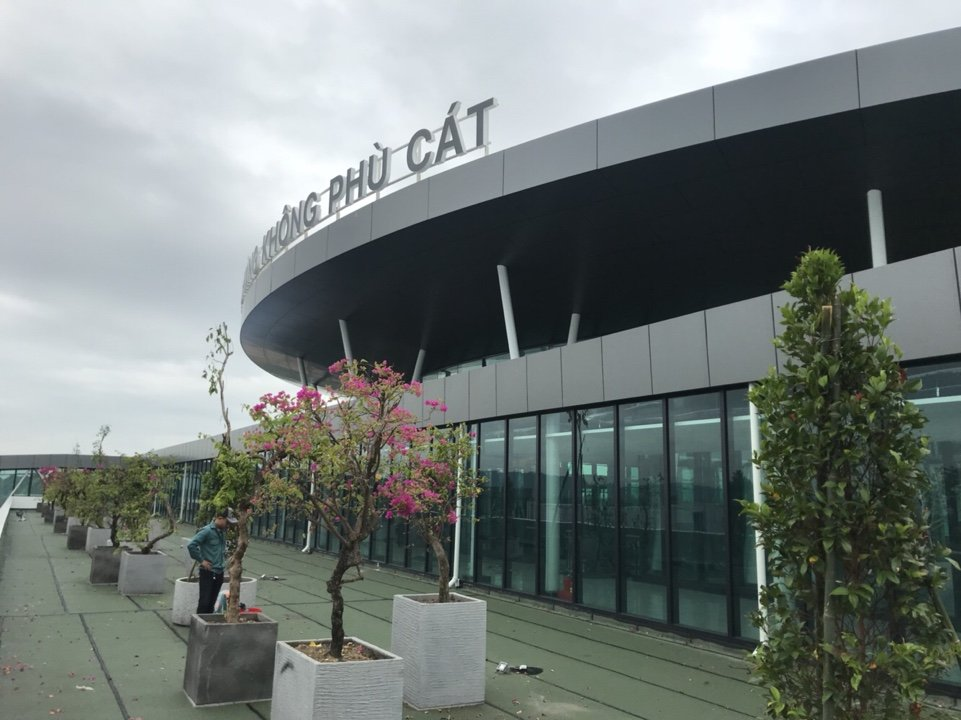
- Terminal entrance
- IATA: UIH; ICAO: VVPC

Summary
- Airport type: Public / military
- Operator: Middle Airport Authority
- Serves: Quy Nhơn
- Location: Phù Cát
- Operating base for: Bamboo Airways
- Elevation AMSL: 24 m (79 ft)
- Coordinates: 13°57′18″N 109°02′32″E
- Website: www.phucatairport.vn

Map
- Location of airport in Vietnam

Runways
Direction	Length		Surface
Direction	m	ft	Surface
15/33	3,051	10,010	Concrete

Statistics (2015)
- Total passengers: 630,935
- Aircraft movements: 4,346
- Sources: GCM, STV

Phu Cat Airport (IATA: UIH, ICAO: VVPC) is an airport serving Quy Nhơn, Vietnam. It is in Phù Cát district between the ward of An Nhơn and the commune of Phù Cát, around 30 kilometres (19 mi) northwest of Quy Nhơn within Gia Lai province along the South Central Coast and Central Highlands of Vietnam.

As well as being a commercial airport, Phu Cat is also used by the Vietnam People's Air Force, being home to the nation's sole squadrons of Sukhoi Su-27 and Yakovlev Yak-130.

Phu Cat Airport is the registered hub serving Bamboo Airways. Phu Cat Airport handled 1.5 million passengers in 2017.

== Airlines and destinations ==
Airlines	Destinations
Bamboo Airways	Hanoi, Ho Chi Minh City
VietJet Air	Hai Phong, Hanoi, Ho Chi Minh City
Vietnam Airlines	Hanoi, Ho Chi Minh City

If passengers would fly internationally from this airport, they would need to transit in either Hanoi or Ho Chi Minh City to get to other international destinations.

== History ==
Phù Cát Airport was built in 1967 during the Vietnam War for the United States Air Force (USAF) by the American construction company RMK-BRJ. During the war, it was a major air base for the Republic of Vietnam Air Force and USAF. Until 1975, the airport was known as Gò Quánh Airport. The airport was one of the major sites for Agent Orange recharge besides Bien Hoa Air Base and Da Nang Air Base. Due to heavy activities involving dioxin during the war, the ground at the airport was polluted with toxic chemicals and cleanup efforts are still ongoing. After 1975, it was used for training purpose by the Vietnamese Air Force and subsequently developed into a mixed-use airport for both regional civic air transport and military activities in 1984 following the suspension of civic service at nearby Qui Nhơn Airfield. In September 1984, the airport served its first commercial flight.

On July 10, 2003, construction on a new 3,000 m^{2} (32,000 sq ft) passenger terminal for the airport started. The terminal was completed in June 2004. It has a capacity of 600,000 passengers per year, with two airplane gates, six check-in counters and two conveyor belts. The airport handled 420,000 passengers in 2014 and held an average 46% annual growth in passengers. The airport served 1.5 million passengers in 2017.

On February 13, 2017, work started on the site of a new passenger terminal for Phu Cat Airport. This terminal, built on a cost of US$22 million, would have a capacity of 1.5 million passengers per year with room for expansion up to 2.4 million. The new terminal opened on May 3, 2018 and completely replaced the 2003-built terminal.

== Gallery ==
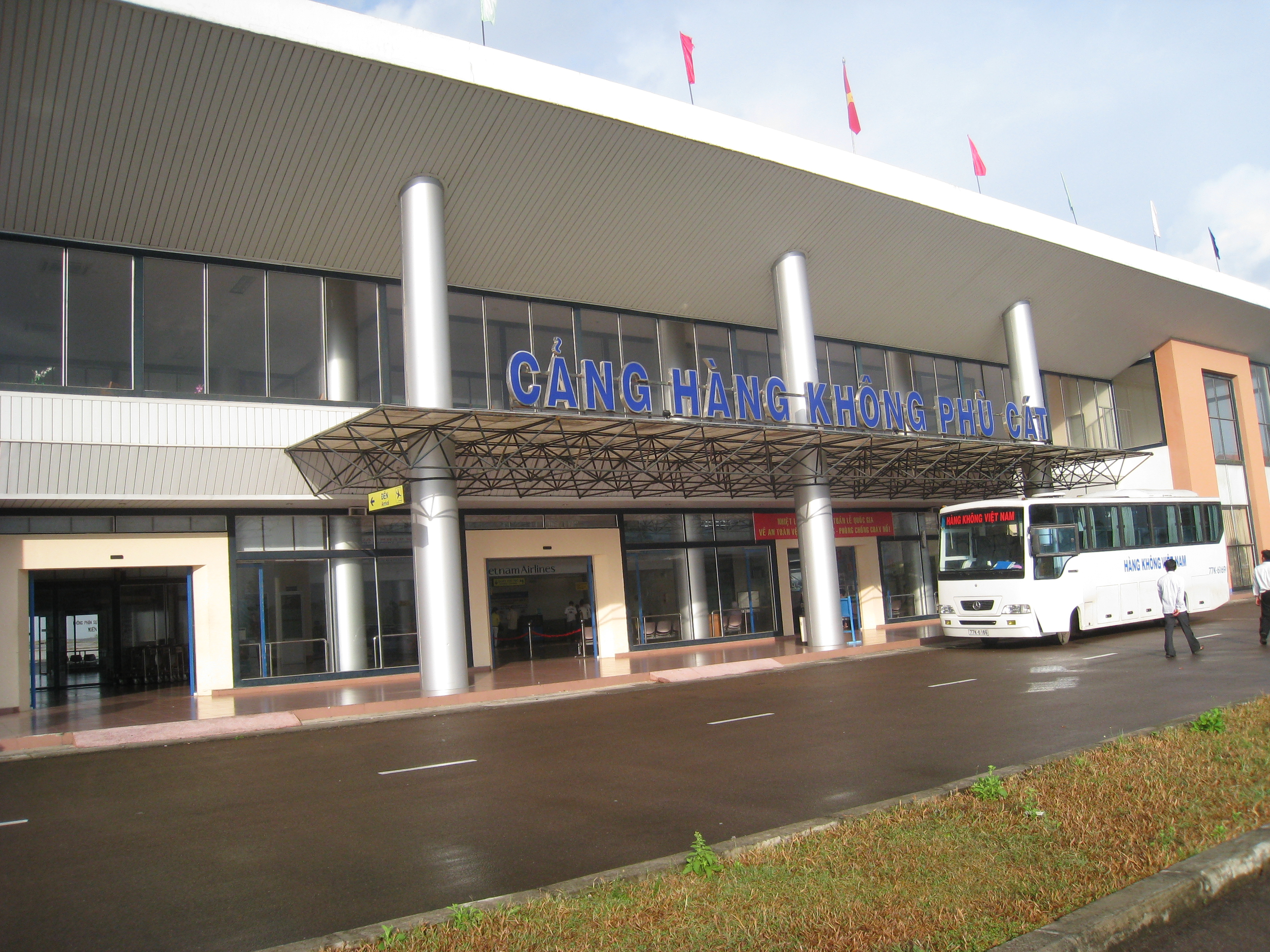
Old terminal at the airport

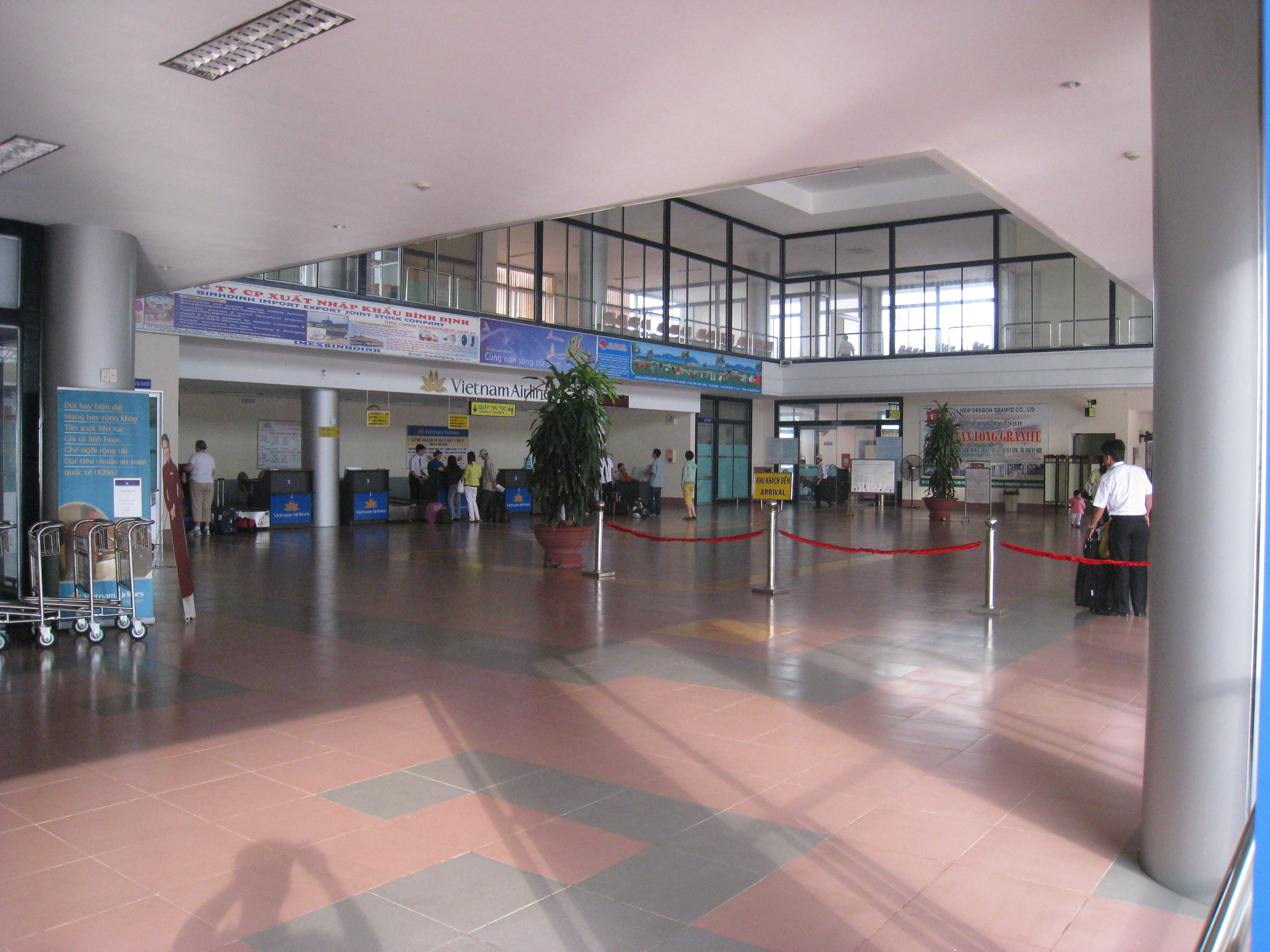
Interior of the Passenger terminal

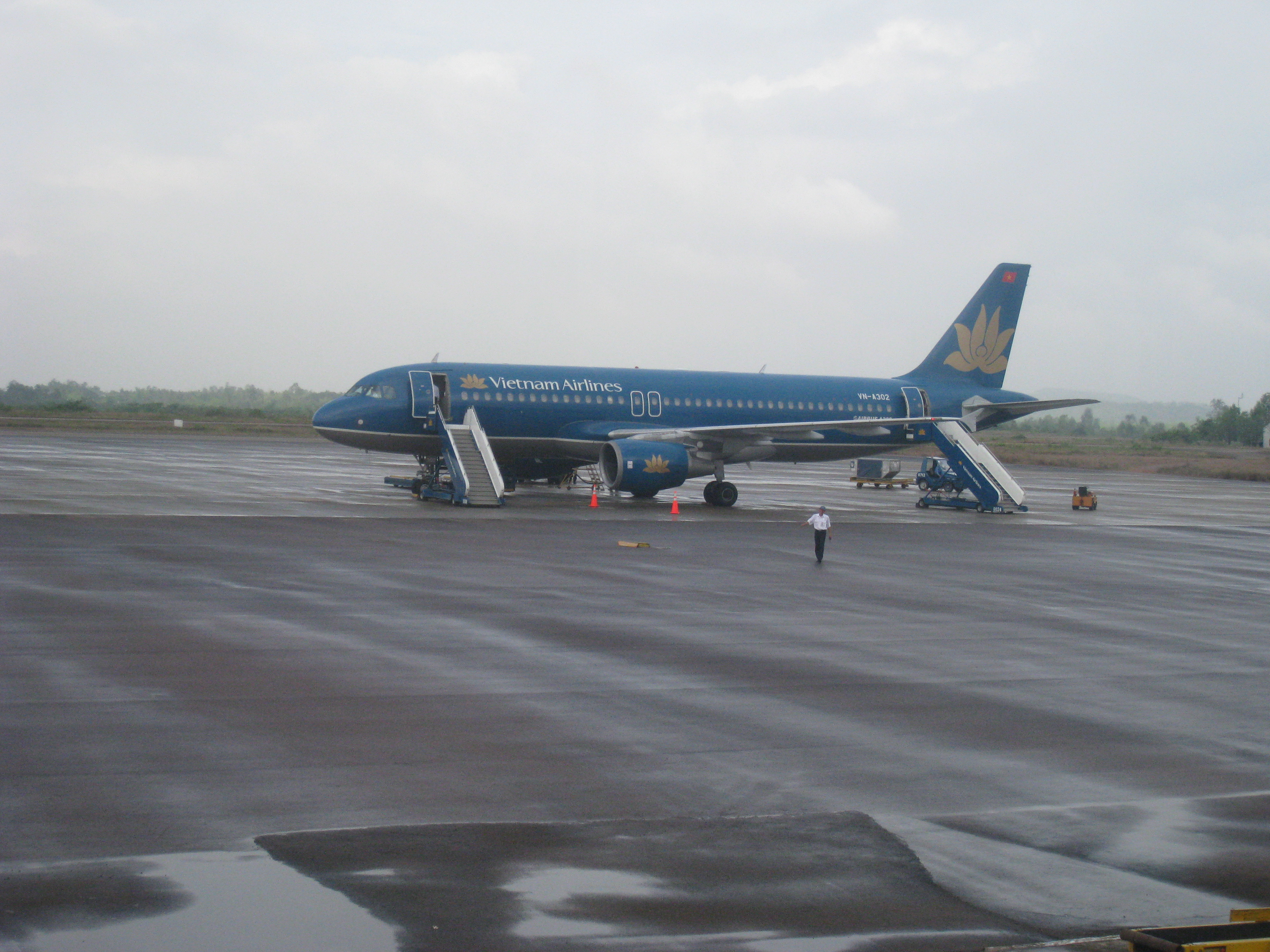
A Vietnam Airlines Airbus A320 at the airport

== See also ==
- List of airports in Vietnam
