= Hoài Ân =

Hoài Ân Xã Hoài Ân
- Commune
- Hoài Ân commune
- Location within Vietnam
- Coordinates: 14°22′10″N 108°58′09″E
- Country: Vietnam
- Region: South Central Coast
- Province: Gia Lai
- Time zone: UTC+7 (UTC + 7)

Hoài Ân is a commune (xã) of Gia Lai Province, Vietnam. It is one of the 135 new wards and communes of the province following the reorganization in 2025.

On June 16, 2025, the Standing Committee of the National Assembly issued Resolution No. 1660/NQ-UBTVQH15 on the reorganization of commune-level administrative units in Gia Lai Province in 2025 (the resolution took effect on the date of its adoption). Accordingly, the entire natural area and population of Tăng Bạt Hổ Township and the communes of Ân Phong, Ân Đức, and Ân Tường Đông were consolidated to establish a new commune named Hoài Ân Commune.
