= Tam Quan =

Tam Quan Phường Tam Quan
- Ward
- Location in Vietnam
- Coordinates: 14°32′55″N 109°02′30″E
- Country: Vietnam
- Province: Gia Lai

Area
  - Total: 7.22 km^{2} (2.79 sq mi)

Population (2019)
  - Total: 11 990
  - Density: 1.661/km^{2} (4.30/sq mi)
- Time zone: UTC+07:00 (Indochina Time)
- Climate: Am

Tam Quan is a ward (phường) of Gia Lai, Vietnam.

== Geography ==
Tam Quan is located in Bình Định's northern lowlands, with the geographical location:

- To the east, Tam Quan Bắc ward and Tam Quan Nam ward
- To the west, Hoài Châu commune
- To the south Hoài Hảo ward
- To the north Hoài Châu Bắc commune.

Tam Quan has an area of 7,22 km^{2} and a population of 11.990 (2019), population density of 1.661/km^{2}. It is located along National Route 1, Vietnam's most important road.

=== Administrative ===
Tam Quan is divided into 9 neighborhoods: 1, 2, 3, 4, 5, 6, 7, 8, 9.

== History ==
Previously, Tam Quan was a commune in Hoai Nhon district. Tam Quan was founded on 7 November 1986 with the separation of the area and population of Tam Quan Bac. After the establishment of Tam Quan had 720 hectares of land and 9.925 people.

26 December 1997, the town of Tam Quan was founded on the basis of 684 hectares of area and 11.833 people. 1 June 2020 marked the establishment of Tam Quan ward.

== Economy ==
Tam Quan has two school secondary schools: Secondary school Nguyen Pearl and Secondary Tam Quan. There is a medical center, garment and other agencies headquarters.

Tam Quan is characterized by coconut forests, with specialties such as sesame and fish sauce.
