= Vĩnh Thạnh district, Bình Định =

Vĩnh Thạnh district Huyện Vĩnh Thạnh
- District
- Interactive map of Vĩnh Thạnh district
- Location of in Vietnam
- Coordinates: 14°6′N 108°47′E
- Country: Vietnam
- Region: South Central Coast
- Province: Bình Định
- Capital: Vĩnh Thạnh townlet

Area
  - Total: 720 km^{2} (280 sq mi)

Population (2024)
  - Total: 66,960
  - Density: 93/km^{2} (240/sq mi)
- Time zone: UTC+7 (Indochina Time)

Vĩnh Thạnh is a rural district (huyện) of Bình Định province in the South Central Coast region of Vietnam. The district capital is Vĩnh Thạnh town.

== Administrative areas ==
Vinh Thanh district has 9 administrative units, the town of Vinh Thanh (the district capital) and 8 communes: Vinh Hao, Vinh Hiep, Vinh Hoa, Vinh Kim, Vinh Quang, Vinh Son, Vinh Thinh, Vinh Thuan.
