= Tuy Phước district =

Tuy Phước district Huyện Tuy Phước
- District
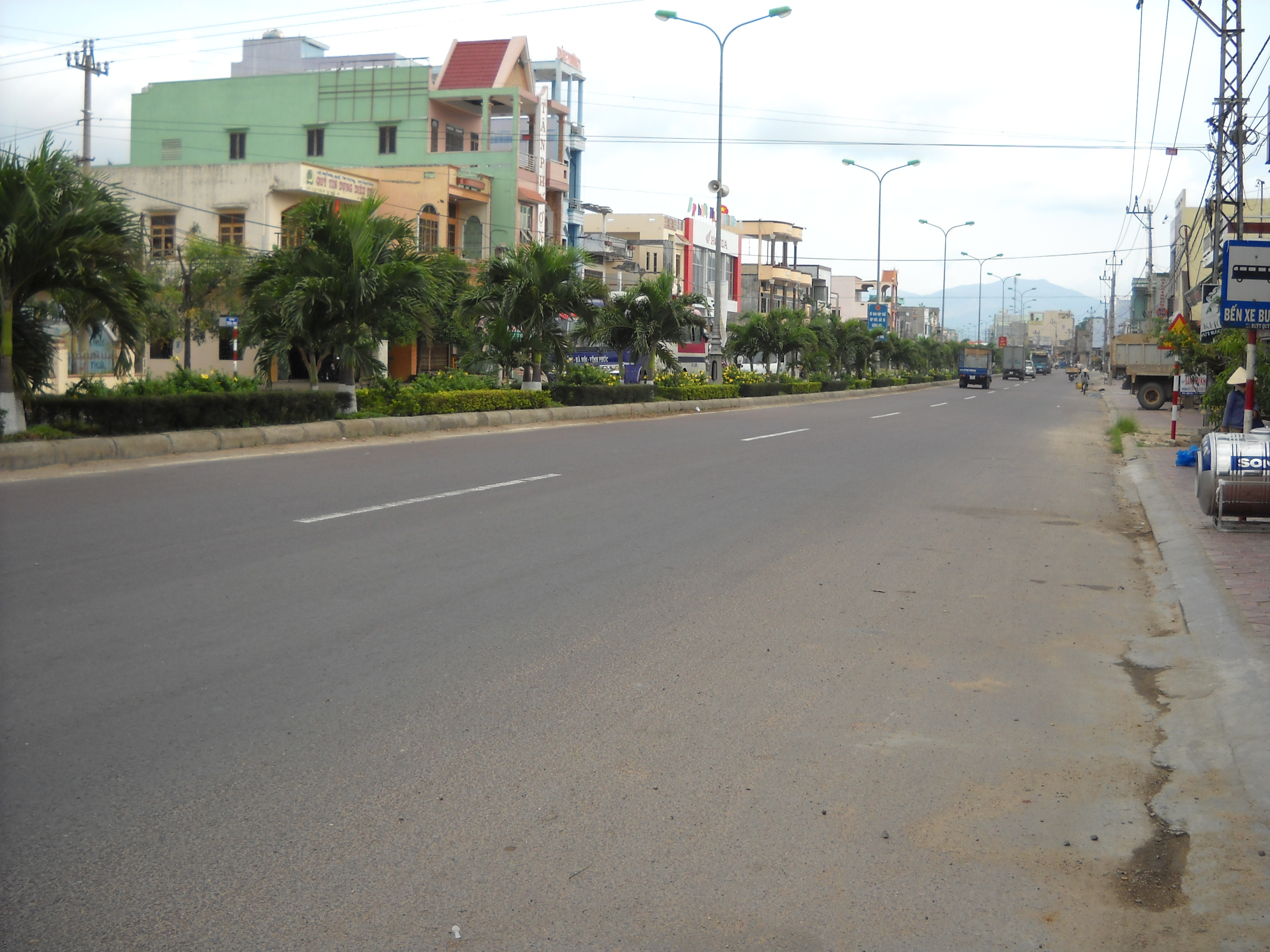
- Diêu Trì street view
- Interactive map of Tuy Phước district
- Location of in Vietnam
- Coordinates: 13°49′N 109°9′E
- Country: Vietnam
- Region: South Central Coast
- Province: Bình Định
- Capital: Tuy Phước

Area
  - Total: 220 km^{2} (85 sq mi)

Population (2024)
  - Total: 255,800
  - Density: 1,200/km^{2} (3,000/sq mi)
- Time zone: UTC+7 (Indochina Time)

Tuy Phước is a former rural district (huyện) of Bình Định province in the South Central Coast region of Vietnam. The district capital lies at Tuy Phước. The district has 13 administrative units, including two towns, Diêu Trì and Tuy Phước, and 11 communes: Phước Thắng, Phước Hưng, Phước Hoà, Phước Quang, Phước Sơn, Phước Hiệp, Phước Lộc, Phước Thuận, Phước Nghĩa, Phước An and Phước Thành.

== Economy ==
Long Mỹ Industrial Zone (Khu Công Nghiệp Long Mỹ) and smaller industrial concentrations (cụm công nghiệp) are in the district. The former is a major centre of wood processing and furniture manufacturing, second only to Phu Tai Industrial Zone. Phước An Industrial Concentration (Cụm Công Nghiệp Phước An) is located in Phước An commune to the west of Diêu Trì. By September 2010, 11 companies had invested there and employed around 3,000 workers in the wood product, granite processing, incense powder, and plastic industries.
