= Air Mekong =

Airline of Vietnam (2009–2013)

IATA	ICAO	Call sign
P8	MKG	MEKONG
- Founded: 2009
- Commenced operations: 9 October 2010
- Ceased operations: 13 March 2013
- Hubs: Phu Quoc
- Secondary hubs: Hanoi-Noi Bai; Ho Chi Minh City-Tan Son Nhat; Phu Quoc-Duong Dong
- Focus cities: Buon Ma Thuot Rach Gia Can Tho
- Fleet size: 4 (+2)
- Destinations: 9
- Parent company: Air Mekong Aviation Joint Stock Company Eximbank (Vietnam)
- Headquarters: Phú Quốc, Kiên Giang Province, Vietnam
- Key people: Đoàn Quốc Việt
- Website: www.airmekong.com.vn

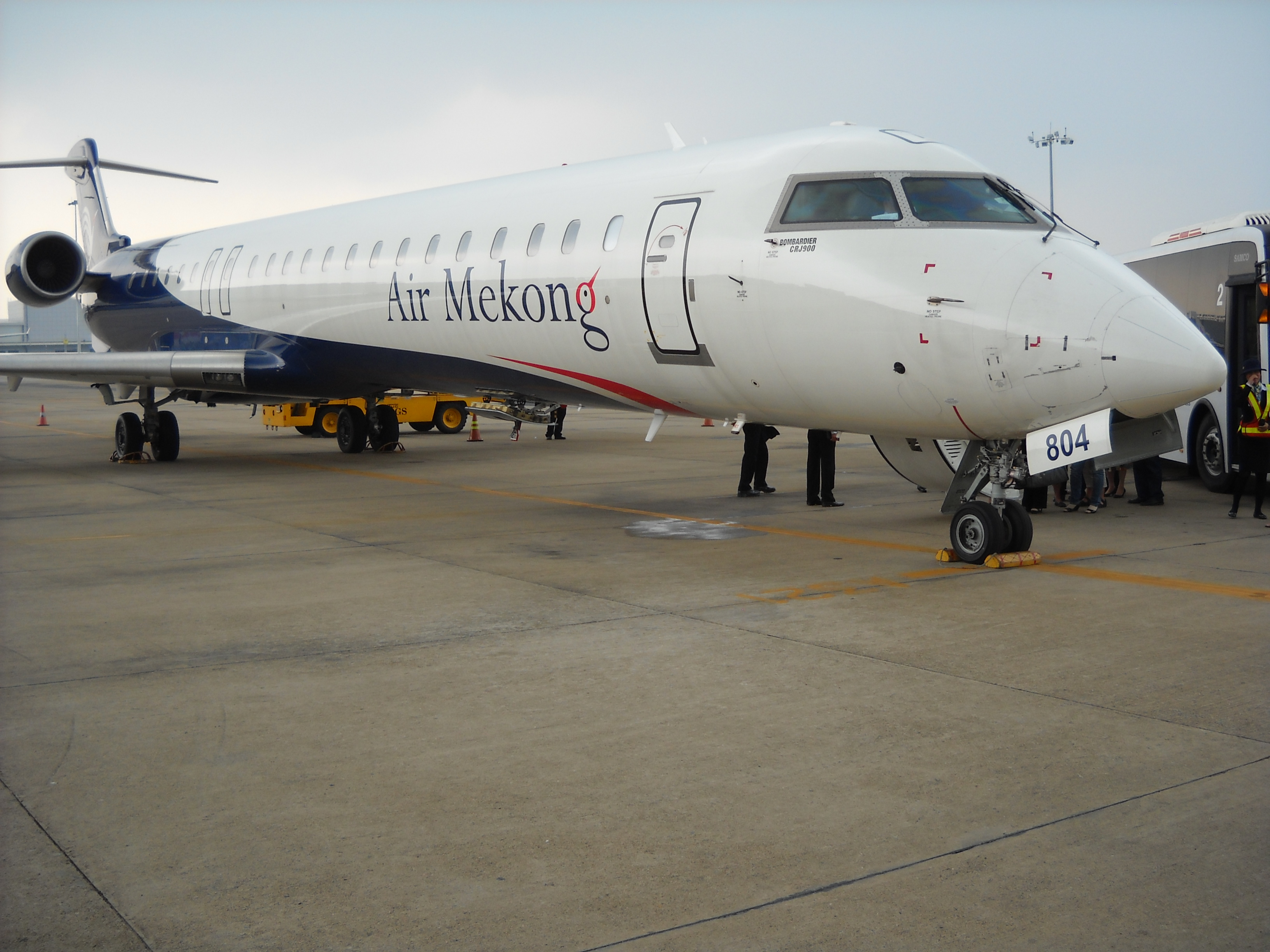
A Bombardier CRJ-900 in Air Mekong's livery at Tan Son Nhat International Airport.

Mekong Aviation Joint Stock Company (Vietnamese: Công ty Cổ phần Hàng không Mê Kông), doing business as Air Mekong, was a short-lived airline from Vietnam which operated scheduled passenger flights from its main hub at the now-closed Duong Dong Airport in Phu Quoc and secondary hubs at Noi Bai International Airport in Hanoi and Tan Son Nhat International Airport in Ho Chi Minh City. Its headquarters were located in Phú Quốc, Kiên Giang Province. It was established in 2009 and flight operations were launched on 9 October 2010. This was the third privately owned airline of Vietnam, after Indochina Airlines (defunct as of 2009), and VietJet Air. Air Mekong leased four Bombardier CRJ 900 aircraft from SkyWest Airlines, each equipped with 90 seats in both business and economy classes. In 2011, Air Mekong operated 10,750 flights and carried about 710,000 passengers.

Air Mekong waz a member of BIM Group. Other shareholders were SkyWest, Inc. ,Air Mekong Company, Inc. and Eximbank.

== Destinations ==
As of August 2011, Air Mekong offered scheduled flights to the following destinations across Vietnam: All these routes have been suspended since 1 March 2013 until the airline changes their fleet. The date of resumption of service has not been announced.

As of January 2015, the license has been revoked following extended dormancy.

Hub
Focus City
Future route
Terminated destinations

City	Country	IATA	ICAO	Airport	Ref
Buon Ma Thuot	Vietnam	BMV	VVBM	Buon Ma Thuot Airport	
Con Dao	Vietnam	VCS	VVCS	Con Dao Airport	
Da Lat	Vietnam	DLI	VVDL	Lien Khuong International Airport	
Da Nang	Vietnam	DAD	VVDN	Da Nang International Airport	
Hanoi	Vietnam	HAN	VVNB	Noi Bai International Airport	
Ho Chi Minh City	Vietnam	SGN	VVTS	Tan Son Nhat International Airport	
Phu Quoc	Vietnam	PQC	VVPQ	Duong Dong Airport	
Pleiku	Vietnam	PXU	VVPK	Pleiku Airport	
Qui Nhon	Vietnam	UIH	VVPC	Phu Cat Airport	
Vinh	Vietnam	VII	VVVH	Vinh Airport	

== Fleet ==
Air Mekong leased four Bombardier CRJ 900 aircraft from SkyWest Airlines equipped with 90 seats in both business and economy class.

Air Mekong
Aircraft	In fleet	Order	Passengers	Notes
Bombardier CRJ-900	4	0	90	
Total	4	0		

== Corporate affairs ==
Air Mekong has its corporate headquarters in Phú Quốc, Kiên Giang Province. Air Mekong maintains its Hanoi branch on the third floor of the Syrena Tower (tòa nhà Syrena) in Tay Ho, Hanoi. The Hanoi office houses the Commerce and Services Department, including the PR & Advertising Division.

== See also ==
- Indochina Airlines
- Pacific Airlines
- Transport in Vietnam
- VietJet Air
