= Phu Quoc Airport (disambiguation) =

Phu Quoc Airport may be one of these below airport

- Duong Dong Airport The closed airport which was used to serve Phu Quoc Island in the past
- Phu Quoc International Airport is an international airport which was completed in 2012 on Phú Quốc Island, southern Vietnam. It's the airport serving Phu Quoc at this time.
