= Phú Quốc Prison =

South Vietnamese military prison and POW camp during Vietnam war

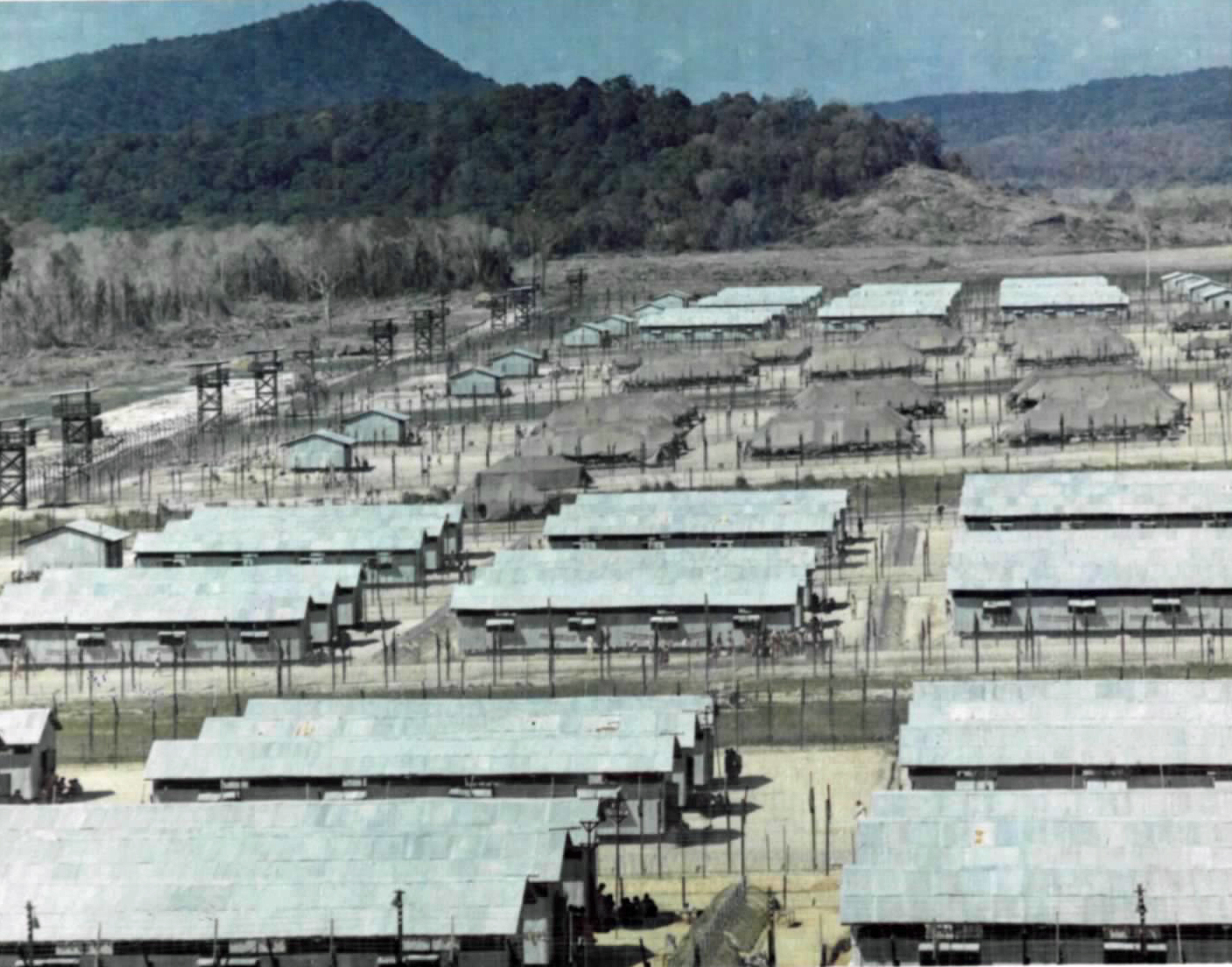
- Camp barracks in November 1968

Site information
- Controlled by: Army of the Republic of Vietnam
- Condition: abandoned

Location
- Coordinates: 10.043948°N 104.018179°E

Site history
- In use: 1949–1975

Phú Quôc Prison (Vietnamese: Nhà tù Phú Quốc also known as An Thoi POW Camp or Coconut Tree Prison) was a military prison in Phú Quốc, southern Vietnam (today it is in Kiên Giang Province).

== History ==
The prison was built in 1949–1950 by French colonialists as a place to detain political dissidents.

During the Vietnam War, it was used for the detention of Viet Cong and North Vietnamese prisoners of war. The prison covered an area of 40,000 square metres (0.015 mi^{2}). During the Tet Offensive in early 1968, 2,665 POWs escaped after attacking the fenceline, few of them were recaptured. The Vietcong shelled or attacked the camp 34 times in 1968.

International Committee of the Red Cross (ICRC) teams visited Phu Quoc Prison in 1969 and 1972. The ICRC found that many POWs showed signs of inadequate food supplies, poor medical care and physical beatings.

The prison was closed after the Fall of Saigon in April 1975.

It is ranked as a special historical relic of national significance by the government of Vietnam and is now a museum.
