= Phú Quốc =

Largest island in Vietnam

Phú Quốc Đặc khu Phú Quốc
- Special administrative zone
- Phú Quốc Special Zone
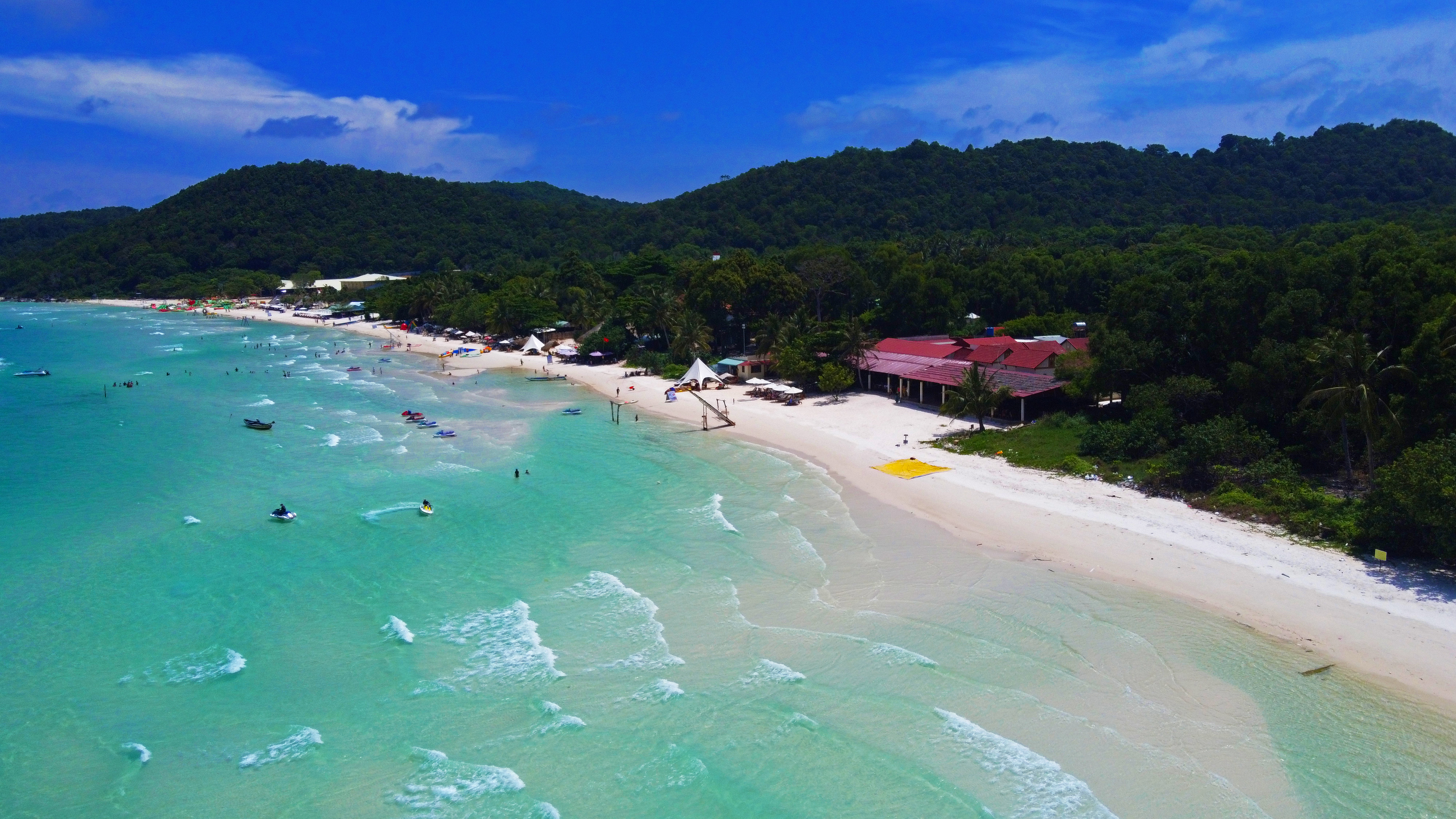
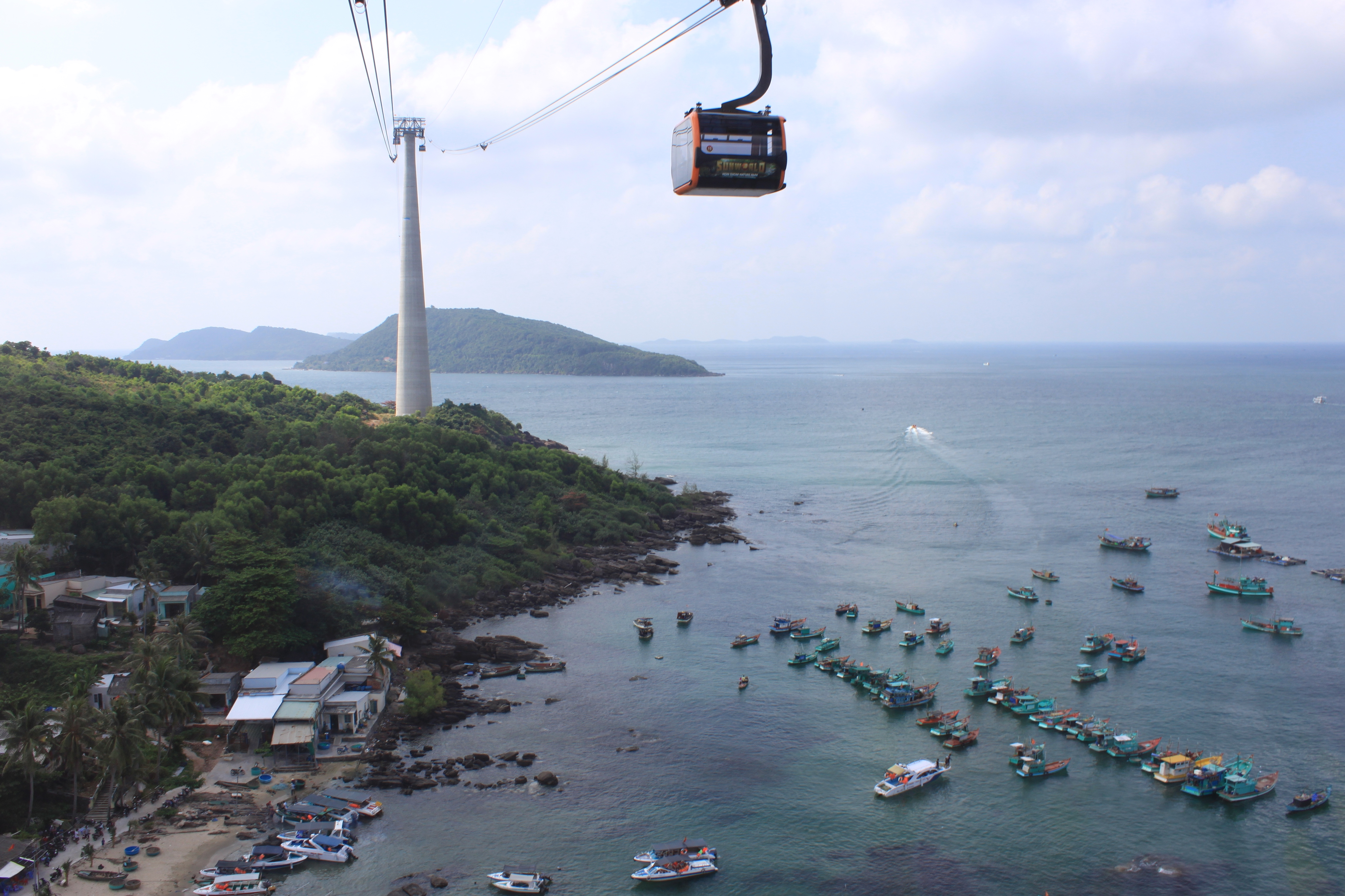
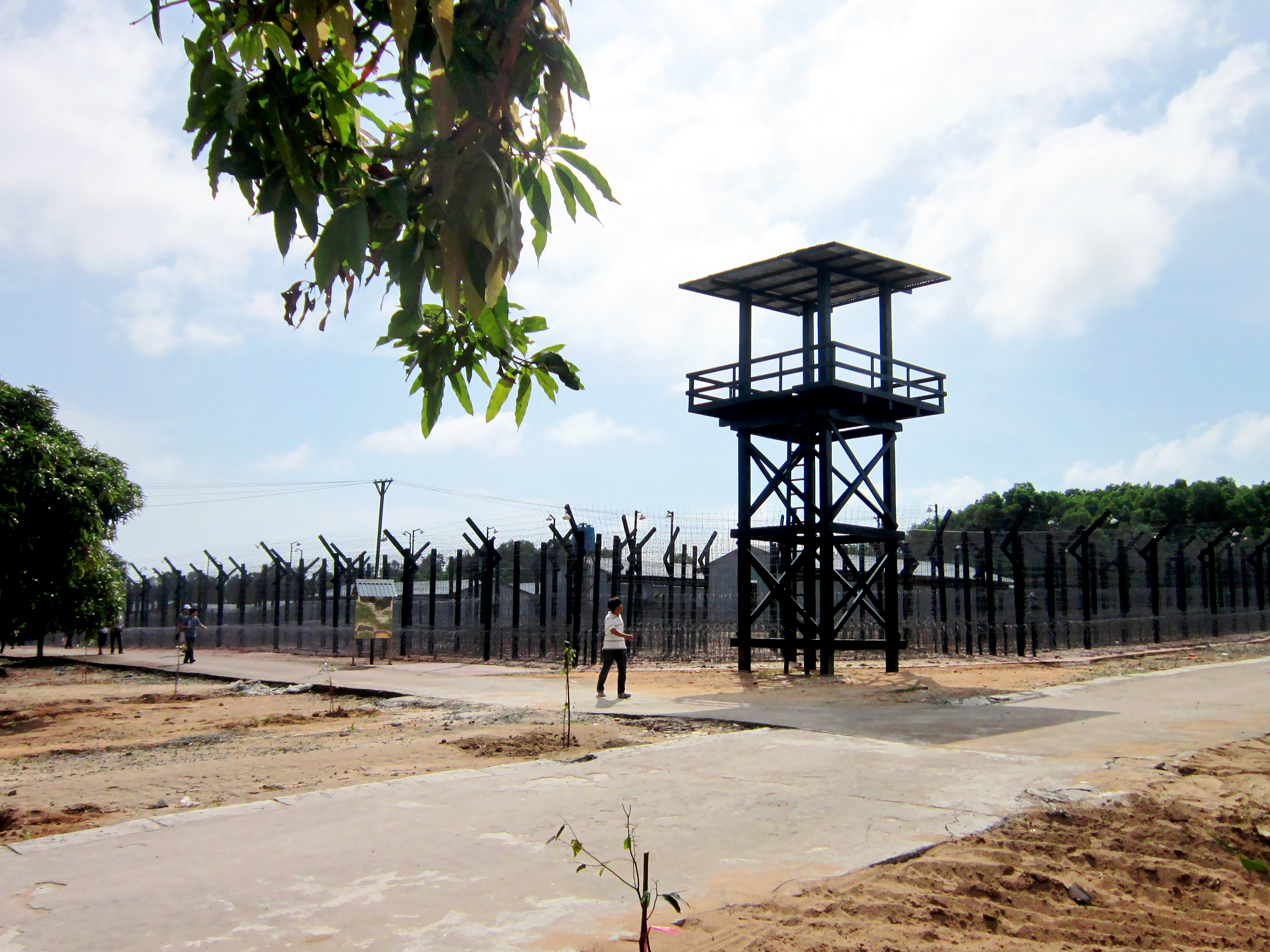
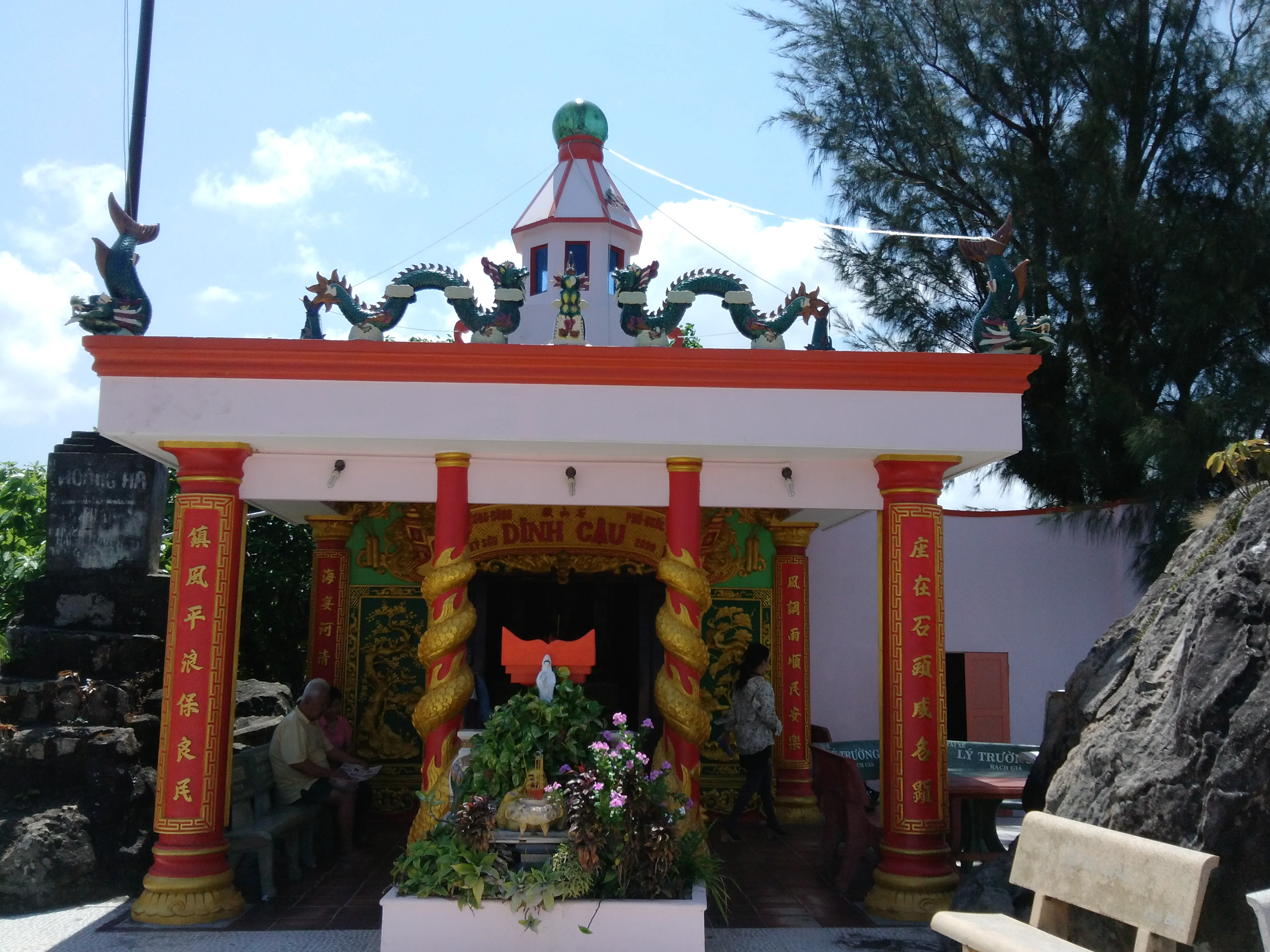
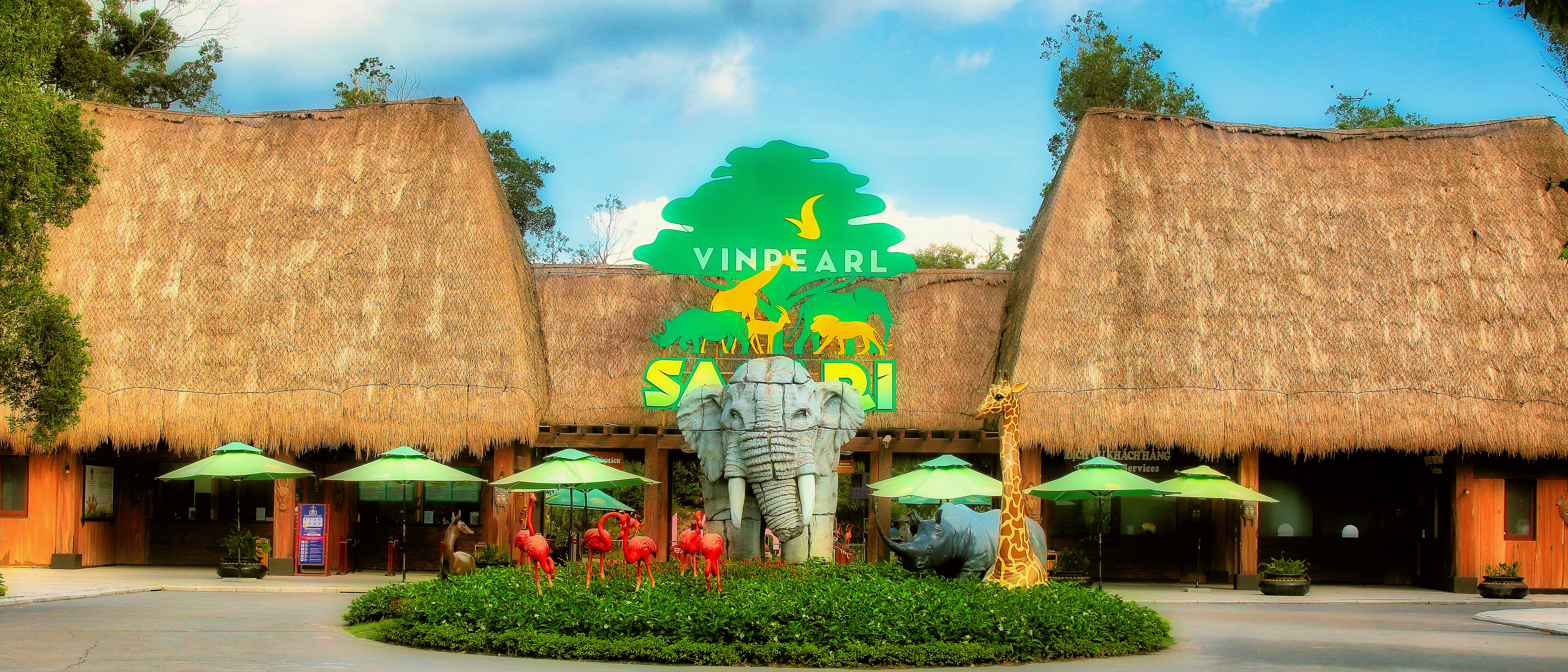
- From left to right, top to bottom: Bãi Sao beach, Hòn Thơm cable car, Phú Quốc Prison, Dinh Cậu shrine, Vinpearl Safari Phú Quốc

- Seal
- Interactive map of Phú Quốc
- Location within Vietnam
- Coordinates: 10°14′N 103°57′E
- Country: Vietnam
- Province: An Giang

Area
  - Total: 575 km^{2} (222 sq mi)

Population (2025)
  - Total: 157,629
  - Density: 644/km^{2} (1,670/sq mi)
- Time zone: UTC+7 (Indochina Time)
- Calling code: 855
- Climate: Am
- Website: phuquoc.angiang.gov.vn

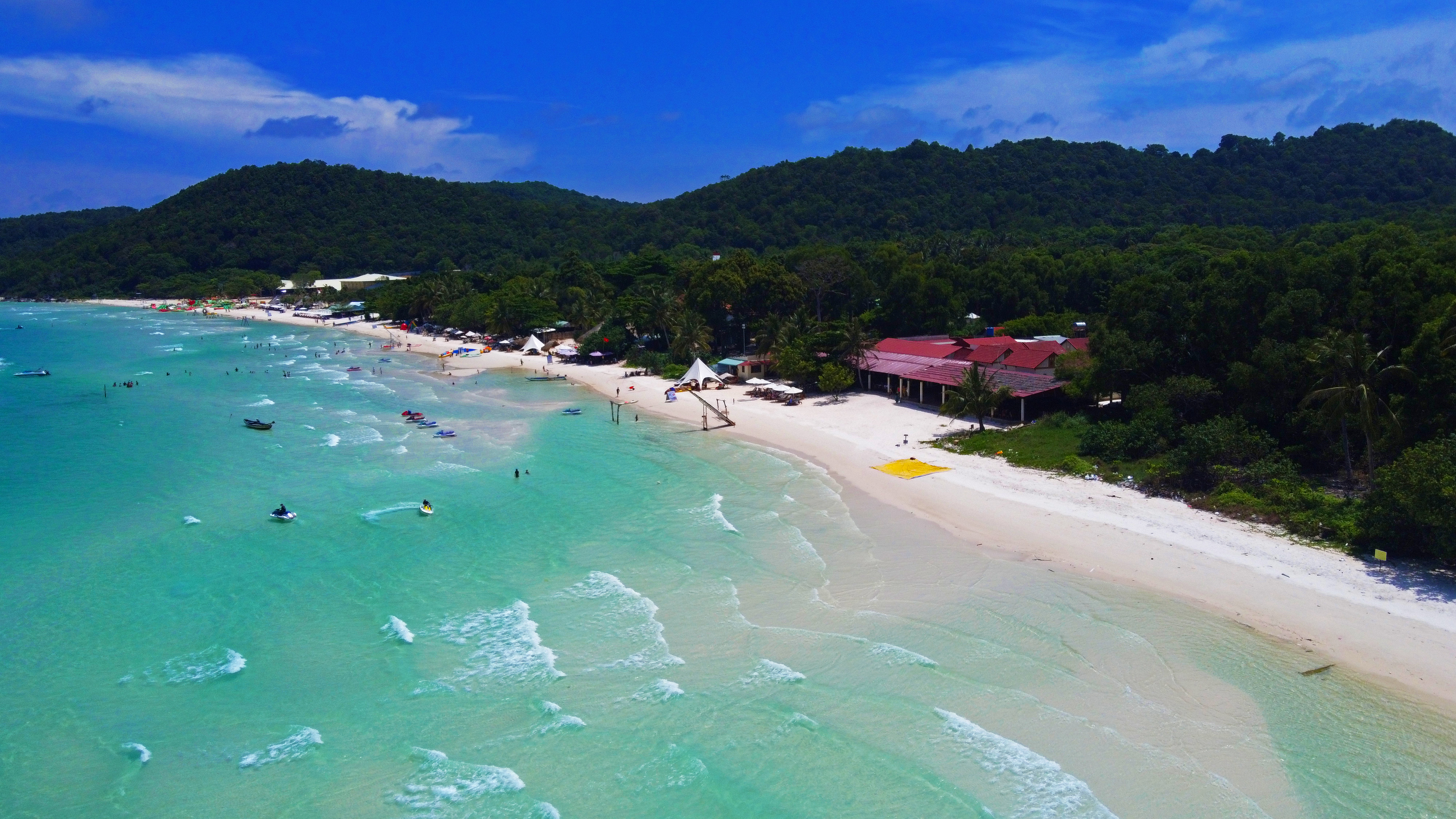
Bãi Sao beach on Phú Quốc island

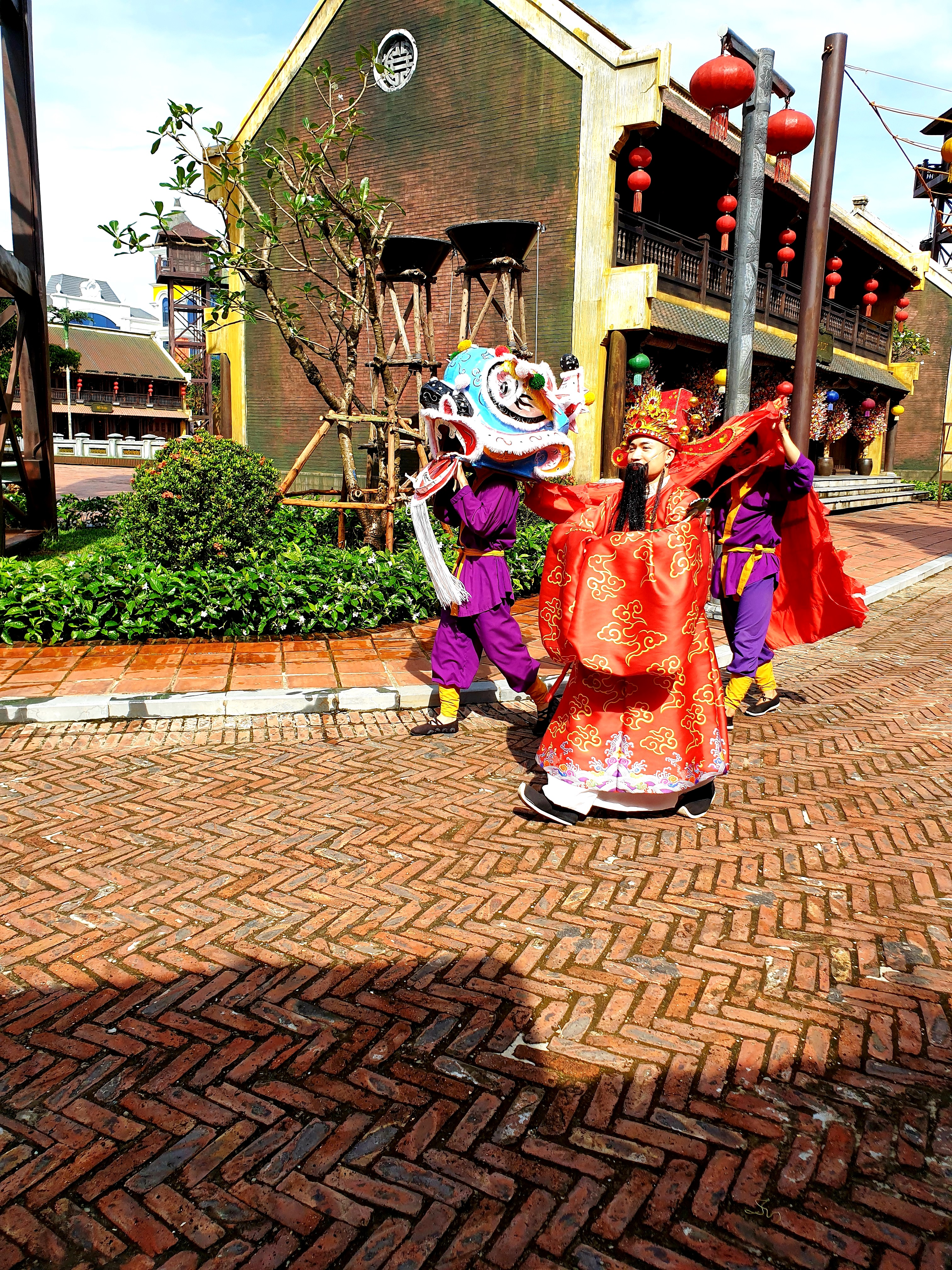
Lion dance with Thần Tài in Thăng Long Cổ trấn, Phú Quốc

Phú Quốc (Vietnamese: [fu˧˥ kuək̚˧˦]) is a special zone in An Giang province, Vietnam. It is the largest island in Vietnam. The island has a total area of 575 km^{2} (222 sq mi) and a permanent population of approximately 179,480 people in 2020.

On June 16, 2025, Phú Quốc became one of the 13 newly established and re-organized special administrative zones of Vietnam, the only city to do so. Later on July 1, "Secretary of the City Committee" Lê Quốc Anh was appointed to become the first "Secretary of the Party Committee of the special zone".

Located in the Gulf of Thailand, Phú Quốc special administrative zone includes the island proper and 21 smaller islets. Dương Đông ward, located on the island's west coast, is the island's administrative centre and largest town. The other ward is An Thới on the southern tip of the island.

Its primary industries are fishing, agriculture, and a fast-growing tourism sector. Phú Quốc has achieved fast economic growth due to its current tourism boom. Many infrastructure projects have been carried out, including several five-star hotels and resorts. Phú Quốc International Airport is the hub connecting Phú Quốc with mainland Vietnam as well as with international destinations.

Since March 2014, Vietnam has allowed all foreign tourists to visit Phú Quốc visa-free for a period of up to 30 days. By 2017, the government of Vietnam planned to set up a Special Administrative Region which covered Phú Quốc Island and its peripheral islets and upgrade it to a provincial city with special administration.

The historical Phú Quốc Prison was based here and was built by the French to detain captured Viet Minh fighters. Continuing into the Vietnam War, Viet Cong and North Vietnamese Army POWs were monitored by South Vietnamese soldiers.

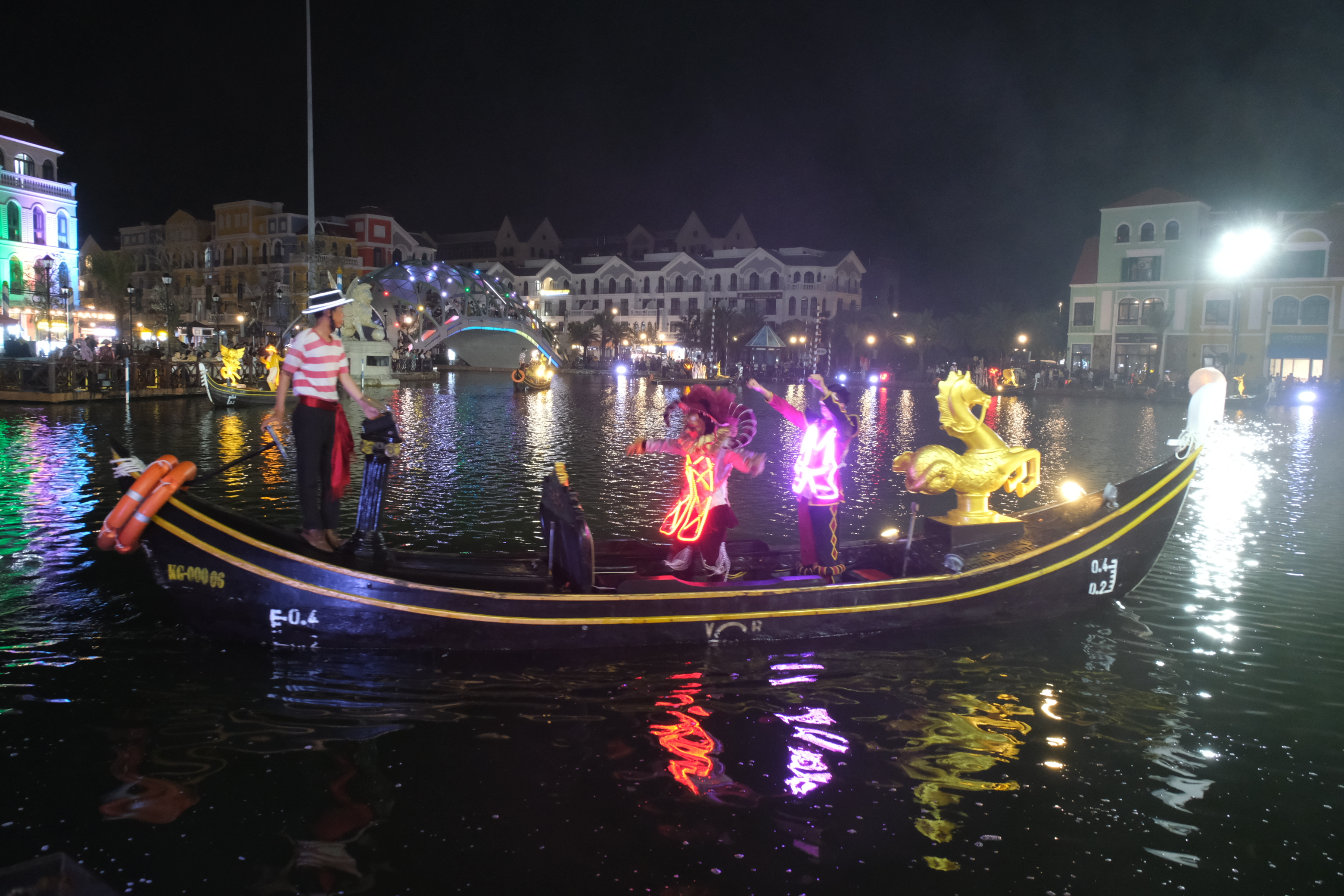
Grand World Phú Quốc

== History ==
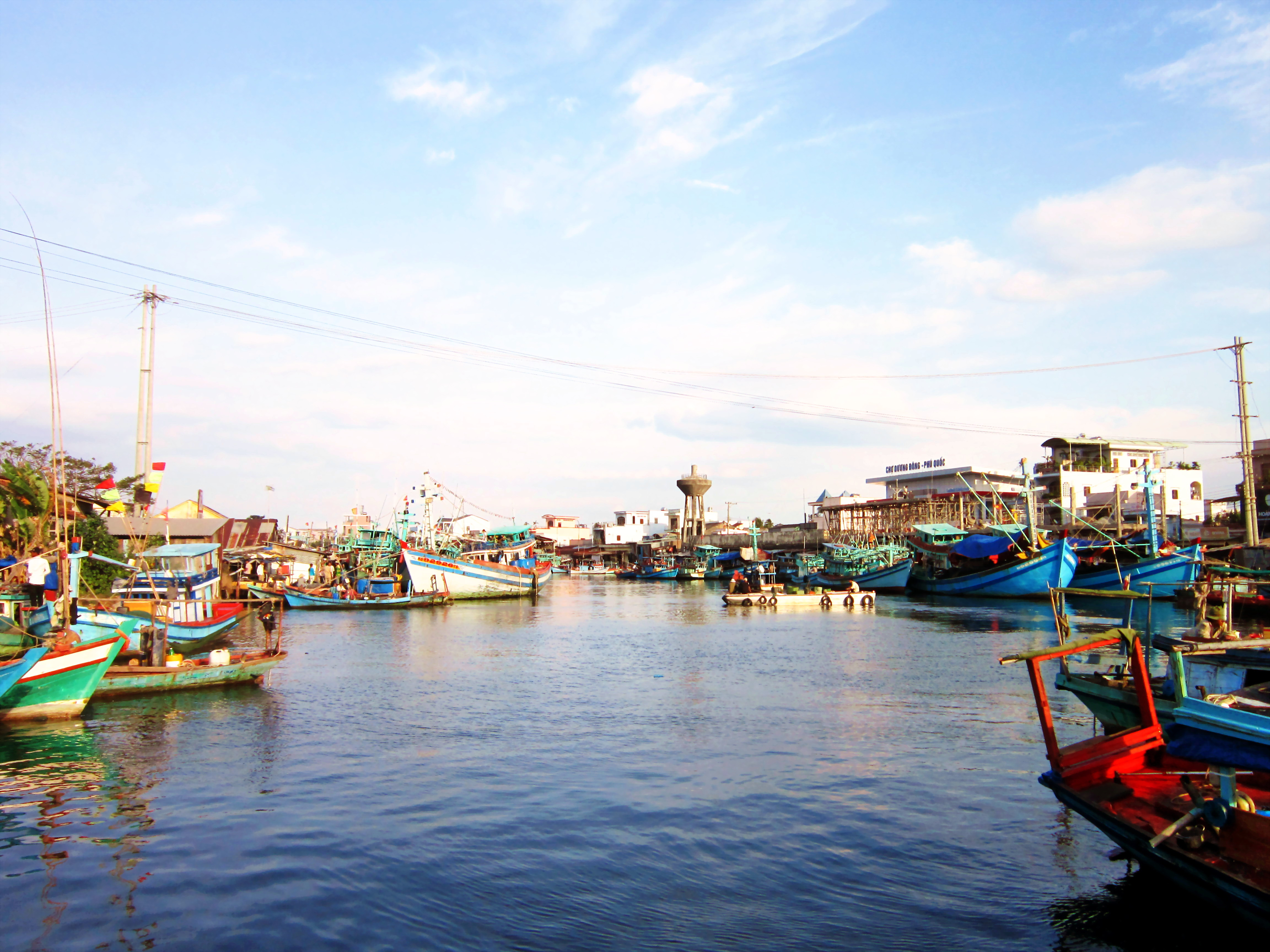
In the area of Dương Đông town market

The earliest Cambodian references to Phú Quốc are found in royal documents dated 1615, however historians have found limited evidence of sustained Khmer presence or of formal Cambodian state authority over the island.

Around 1680, Phú Quốc was part of the Principality of Hà Tiên, a maritime polity founded by Chinese merchant and explorer Mạc Cửu under the patronage of the Cambodian king.

Mạc Cửu later switched allegiance to the Nguyễn lords and recognized the authority of the Vietnamese sovereign. He sent a tribute mission to the Nguyễn court in 1708, and in return received the title of Tong Binh of Hà Tiên and the noble title Marquess Cửu Ngọc (Vietnamese: Cửu Ngọc hầu).

Mạc Cửu died in 1736, and his son Mạc Thiên Tứ (Mo Shilin) succeeded him. The Cambodian army attempted to liberate Hà Tiên in 1739 but was defeated. From then on, Cambodia did not try to retake Hà Tiên; it enjoyed full independence from Cambodia thereafter.

Mạc Thiên Tứ's reign saw the golden age of Hà Tiên. In 1758, Hà Tiên established Outey II as puppet king of Cambodia. After the war of the second fall of Ayutthaya, Mạc Thiên Tứ tried to install Prince Chao Chui (เจ้าจุ้ย, Chiêu Thúy in Vietnamese) as the new Siamese king, but was defeated by Taksin. Hà Tiên was completely devastated by Siamese troops in 1771, and Mạc Thiên Tứ had flee to Trấn Giang (modern Cần Thơ). There, he was sheltered by the Nguyễn lords. Two years later, Siamese army withdrew from Hà Tiên, and Mạc Thiên Tứ retook his principality.

The French missionary Pigneau de Behaine used the island as a base during the 1760s and 1780s to shelter Nguyễn Ánh, who was hunted by the Tây Sơn army. Descriptions of this mission make reference to the local Vietnamese population of the island but not the Khmer.

The British envoy John Crawfurd, en route to Siam from Singapore in March 1822, made a stop at Phú Quốc, which he transcribed as Phu-kok. His entry is as follows:

The place which we had now visited is called by the Cochinchinese, Phu-kok, and by the Siamese Koh-dud... In the Kambojan language it is called Koh-trol... It is the largest island on the east coast of the Gulf of Siam, being by our reckoning not less than thirty-four miles in length. It is commonly bold high land, the highest hills rising to seven or eight hundred feet. A few spots here and there on the coasts only are inhabited, -the rest being, as usual, covered with a great forest, which we were told, contained abundance of deer, hogs, wild buffaloes, and oxen, but no leopards or tigers... The inhabitants of Phu-kok were described to us as amounting to four to five thousand, all of the true Cochinchinese race, with the exception of a few occasional Chinese sojourners. They grow no species of corn and their husbandry is confined to a few coarse fruits and esculent green vegetables and farinaceous roots..."

Western records in 1856 again mentioned the island: "... King Ang Duong (of Cambodia) apprize Mr. de Montigny, French envoy in visit to Bangkok, through the intermediary of Bishop Miche, his intention to yield Phú Quốc to France." Such a proposition aimed to create a military alliance with France to avoid the threat of Vietnam on Cambodia. The proposal did not receive an answer from the French. An 1856 publication by The Nautical Magazine describes Phú Quốc to still be part of Cambodia even though it was occupied by the Cochinchinese. The quote from the publication is:

The whole of the island is thickly wooded, and only the shore parts appear to be inhabited, principally by Cochinchinese, for although in the empire of Cambodia it has been seized upon by the unscrupulous inhabitants of Cancao."

While the war between Vietnam and France was about to begin, Ang Duong sent another letter, dated November 25, 1856, to Napoleon III to warn him about Cambodian claims on the lower Cochinchina region: the Cambodian king listed provinces and islands, including Phú Quốc, as being parts of Vietnam for several years or decades (in the case of Saigon some 200 years). Ang Duong asked the French emperor to not annex any part of these territories because, as he wrote, despite this relatively long Vietnamese rule, they remained Cambodian lands. In 1867, Phú Quốc's Vietnamese authorities pledged allegiance to French troops just conquering Hà Tiên.

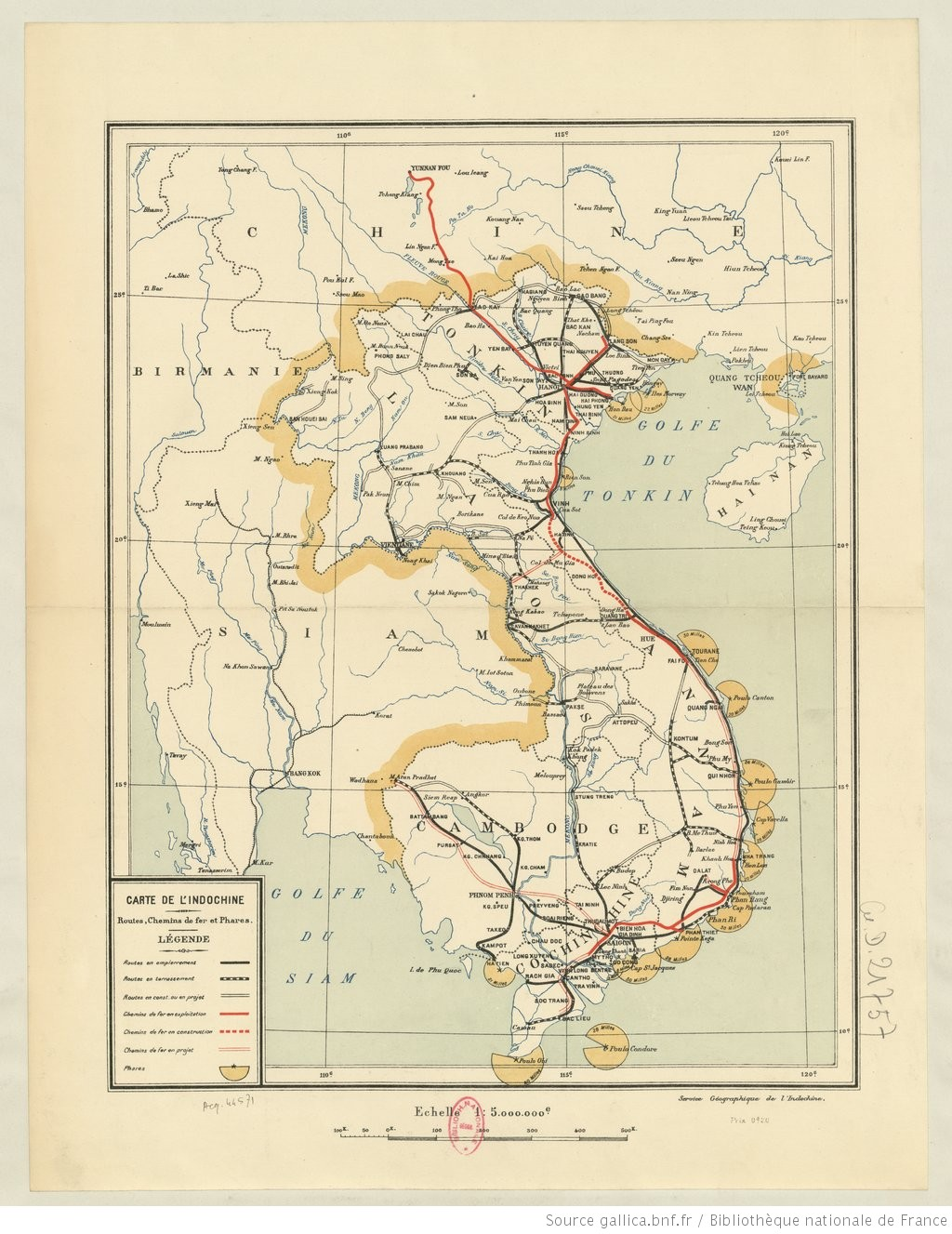
French Indochina c.1933

In 1939, for administrative purposes, Governor General of French Indochina, Jules Brévié, drew a line demarcating a maritime boundary between Cambodia and Cochinchina, and Phú Quốc remained under Cochinchina administration. After the Geneva Accords, in 1954, Cochinchina's sovereignty was handed over to Vietnam.

After mainland China fell under the control of the Chinese Communist Party in 1949, General Huang Chieh moved 33,000+ Republic of China Army soldiers mostly from Hunan Province to Vietnam, and they were interned on Phú Quốc. Later, in June 1953, the army moved to Taiwan.

In 1967, the Vietnamese and Cambodian government accepted the "Brévié Line" as the maritime border. Later on, Sihanouk renewed his claim on Koh Tral (Khmer: កោះត្រល់). The Vietnamese also abandoned their previous acceptance of the Brevie Line.

From 1953 to 1975, the island housed South Vietnam's largest prisoner camp (40,000 in 1973), known as Phú Quốc Prison. Phú Quốc was located in IV Corps Tactical Zone and was an integral part of South Vietnam's system for detaining enemy prisoners.

On May 1, 1975, a squad of Khmer Rouge soldiers raided and took Phú Quốc, but Vietnam soon recaptured it. This was to be the first of a series of incursions and counter-incursions that would escalate to the Cambodian–Vietnamese War in 1979. Cambodia dropped its claims to Phú Quốc in 1976. But the bone of contention involving the island between the governments of the two countries continued, as both have a historical claim to it and the surrounding waters. A July 1982 agreement between Vietnam and The People's Republic of Kampuchea ostensibly settled the dispute; however, the island is still the object of irredentist sentiments.

In 1999 the Cambodian representative to the Vietnam-Cambodia Joint Border Commission affirmed the state's acceptance of the Brevie Line and Vietnamese sovereignty over Phú Quốc, a position reported to and accepted by the National Assembly.

Before 2025, it was a provincial city of Kiên Giang Province.

== Geography ==
=== Topography ===
Phú Quốc lies south of the Cambodian coast, south of Kampot, and 40 kilometres (22 nmi) west of Hà Tiên, the nearest coastal town in Vietnam. Roughly triangular in shape the island is 50 kilometres (31 mi) long from north to south and 25 kilometres (16 mi) from east to west at its widest. It is also located 17 nautical miles (31 km) from Kampot, 62 nautical miles (115 km) from Rạch Giá and nearly 290 nautical miles (540 km) from Laem Chabang, Thailand. A mountainous ridge known as "99 Peaks" runs the length of Phú Quốc, with Chúa Mountain being the tallest at 603 metres (1,978 ft).

Phú Quốc Island is mainly composed of sedimentary rocks from the Mesozoic and Cenozoic age, including heterogeneous conglomerate composition, layering thick, quartz pebbles, silica, limestone, rhyolite and felsite. The Mesozoic rocks are classified in Phú Quốc Formation (K pq). The Cenozoic sediments are classified in formations of Long Toàn (middle - upper Pleistocene), Long Mỹ (upper Pleistocene), Hậu Giang (lower - middle Holocene), upper Holocene sediments, and undivided Quaternary (Q).

=== Administration ===
The special administrative region of Phú Quốc is officially divided into eight commune-level sub-divisions, including two urban wards (Dương Đông, An Thới) and seven rural communes (Bãi Thơm, Cửa Cạn, Cửa Dương, Dương Tơ, Gành Dầu, Hàm Ninh).

== Economy ==
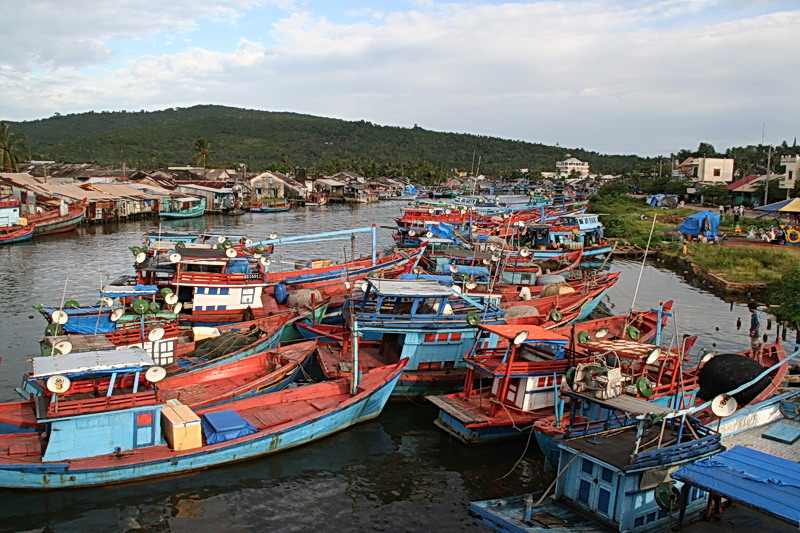
Fishing has historically been the dominant industry in Phú Quốc.

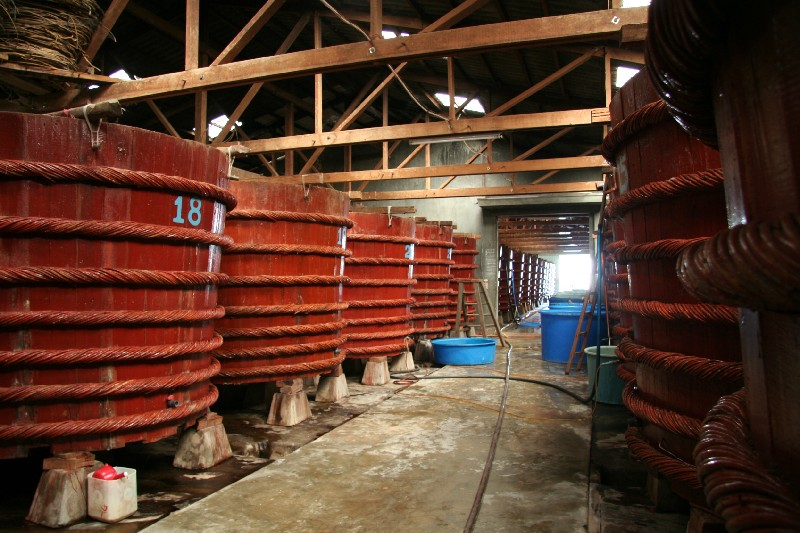
A traditional fish sauce factory in Phú Quốc

Phú Quốc is famous for its two traditional products: fish sauce and black pepper. The rich fishing grounds offshore provides the anchovy catch from which the sauce is made. As widely agreed among the Vietnamese people, the best fish sauce comes from Phú Quốc. The island name is coveted and abused in the fish sauce industry that local producers have been fighting for the protection of its appellation of origin. Pepper is cultivated everywhere on the island, especially at Gành Dầu and Cửa Dương communes. The pearl farming activity began more than 20 years ago when Australian and Japanese experts arrived to develop the industry with advanced technology. Some Vietnamese pearl farms were established at that time including Quốc An.

Tourism plays an important role in the economy, with the beaches being the main attraction. Phú Quốc was served by Phú Quốc Airport with air links to Ho Chi Minh City (Saigon) Tan Son Nhat International Airport, Hanoi (Noi Bai International Airport), Rạch Giá (Rạch Giá Airport) and Can Tho (Can Tho International Airport). Phú Quốc Airport was closed and replaced by the new Phú Quốc International Airport from December 2, 2012. Phú Quốc is also linked with Rạch Giá and Hà Tiên by ferries. Air Mekong used to have its headquarters in An Thới.

Many domestic and international projects related to tourism have been carried out, including the latest direct flights from Bangkok to Phú Quốc by Bangkok Airways, which could make Phú Quốc a new tourist hub in Southeast Asia.

With the combination of Vinpearl Phú Quốc Resorts and the opening of the new Vinmec Phú Quốc International Hospital in June 2015, Phú Quốc will add an additional source of revenue to the local economy in terms of medical services, medical tourism and medical education.

== Climate ==
The island's monsoonal sub-equatorial climate is characterized by distinct rainy (April to November) and dry seasons (December to March). As is common in regions with this climate type, there is some rain even in the dry season. The annual rainfall is high, averaging 3,029 mm (9.938 ft). In the northern mountains up to 4,000 mm (13 ft) has been recorded. April and May are the hottest months, with temperatures reaching 35 °C (95 °F).

Climate data for Phú Quốc
Month	Jan	Feb	Mar	Apr	May	Jun	Jul	Aug	Sep	Oct	Nov	Dec	Year
Record high °C (°F)	35.1 (95.2)	35.3 (95.5)	38.1 (100.6)	37.5 (99.5)	37.0 (98.6)	34.0 (93.2)	33.4 (92.1)	33.4 (92.1)	33.3 (91.9)	34.5 (94.1)	33.2 (91.8)	34.6 (94.3)	38.1 (100.6)
Mean daily maximum °C (°F)	30.6 (87.1)	31.1 (88.0)	32.1 (89.8)	32.5 (90.5)	31.6 (88.9)	30.4 (86.7)	29.8 (85.6)	29.6 (85.3)	29.5 (85.1)	30.2 (86.4)	30.7 (87.3)	30.3 (86.5)	30.7 (87.3)
Daily mean °C (°F)	25.9 (78.6)	26.6 (79.9)	27.8 (82.0)	28.5 (83.3)	28.6 (83.5)	28.0 (82.4)	27.6 (81.7)	27.5 (81.5)	27.2 (81.0)	26.8 (80.2)	26.9 (80.4)	26.3 (79.3)	27.3 (81.1)
Mean daily minimum °C (°F)	23.0 (73.4)	23.7 (74.7)	24.9 (76.8)	25.6 (78.1)	25.8 (78.4)	25.6 (78.1)	25.2 (77.4)	25.2 (77.4)	25.0 (77.0)	24.5 (76.1)	24.4 (75.9)	23.4 (74.1)	24.7 (76.5)
Record low °C (°F)	16.0 (60.8)	16.0 (60.8)	18.5 (65.3)	21.0 (69.8)	22.1 (71.8)	21.2 (70.2)	21.7 (71.1)	21.6 (70.9)	22.0 (71.6)	20.8 (69.4)	16.0 (60.8)	17.1 (62.8)	16.0 (60.8)
Average rainfall mm (inches)	27.7 (1.09)	27.2 (1.07)	61.0 (2.40)	148.2 (5.83)	280.8 (11.06)	381.9 (15.04)	419.2 (16.50)	485.6 (19.12)	473.6 (18.65)	354.2 (13.94)	163.5 (6.44)	59.1 (2.33)	2,881.9 (113.46)
Average rainy days	4.6	3.7	6.6	11.7	19.0	21.0	22.5	23.6	22.8	21.5	13.8	6.2	177.1
Average relative humidity (%)	75.9	77.4	77.5	80.2	83.2	85.2	85.9	86.5	87.5	86.3	79.5	73.8	81.6
Mean monthly sunshine hours	247.5	232.4	256.5	246.4	195.8	148.0	146.9	137.1	137.9	169.8	210.1	240.1	2,373.1
Source: Vietnam Institute for Building Science and Technology

== Protections ==
Phú Quốc has both a terrestrial national park and a marine protection.

Phú Quốc National Park was established in 2001 as an upgrade of a former conservation zone. The park covers 336.57 km^{2} (129.95 sq mi) of the northern part of the island.

Phú Quốc Marine Protected Area, or just Phú Quốc MPA, was established in 2007 at the northern and southern end of the island and covers 187 km^{2} (72 sq mi) of marine area. The sea around Phú Quốc is one of the richest fishing grounds in all of Vietnam, and the aim of the protected area is to secure coral reef zones, seagrass beds, and mangrove forests, all key spawning and nursery grounds for aquatic species, including blue swimming crabs. Among the aquatic animals in the protected area are green turtle, leather back turtles, dolphin and dugong.

Plastic waste is a growing problem in Phú Quốc, and the local community has organized clean-up efforts.

== Gallery ==
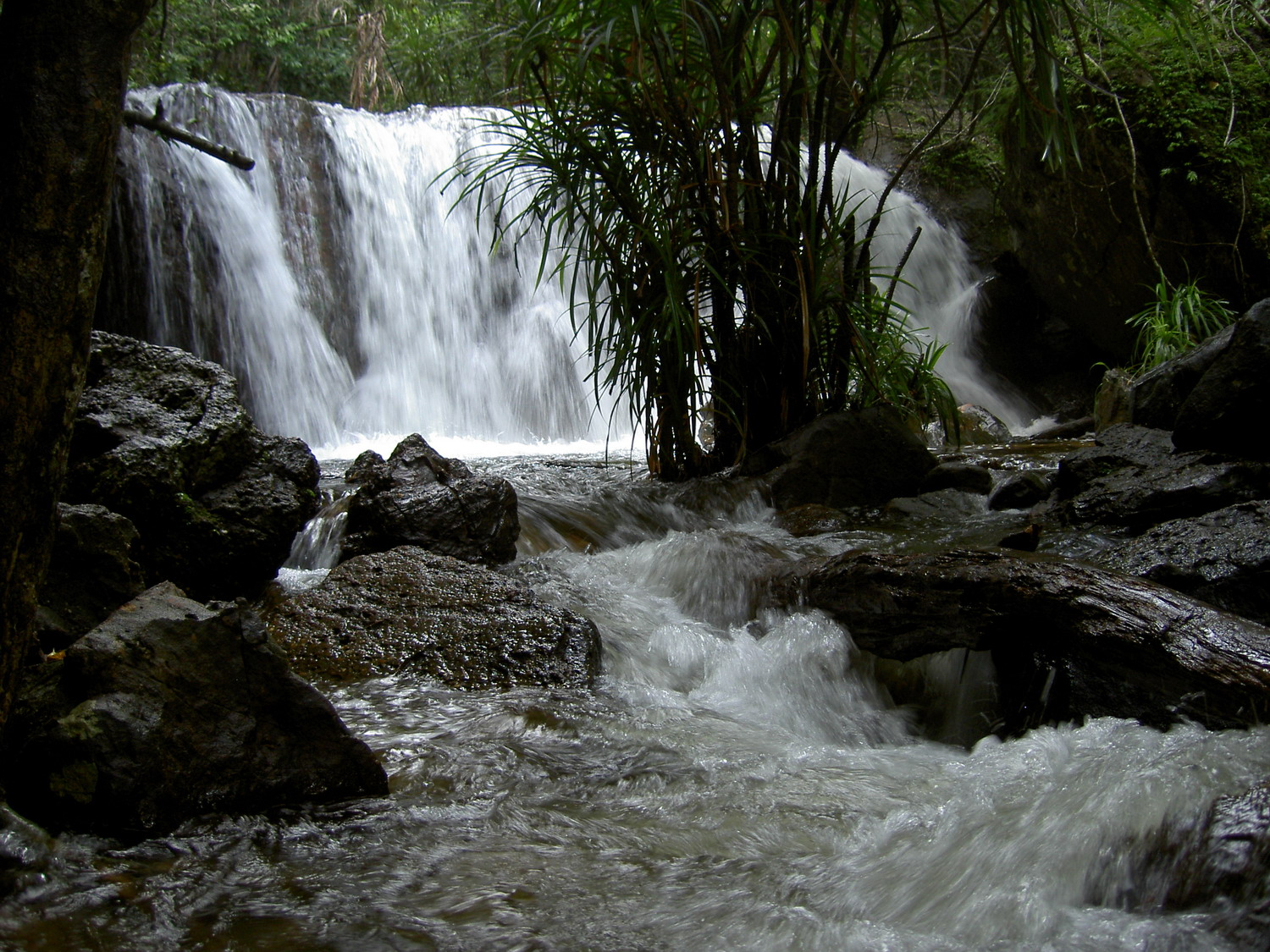
Suối Tranh Cascades

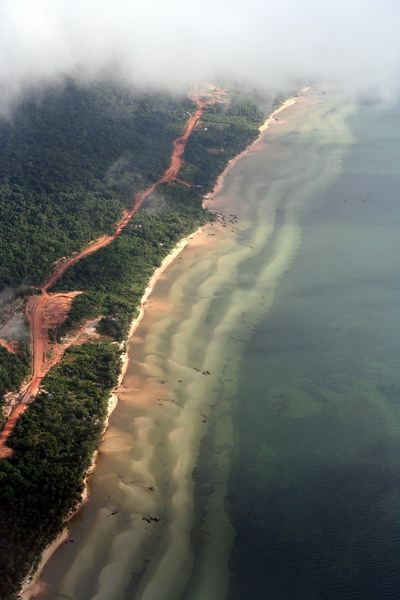
Phú Quốc's sandy beaches

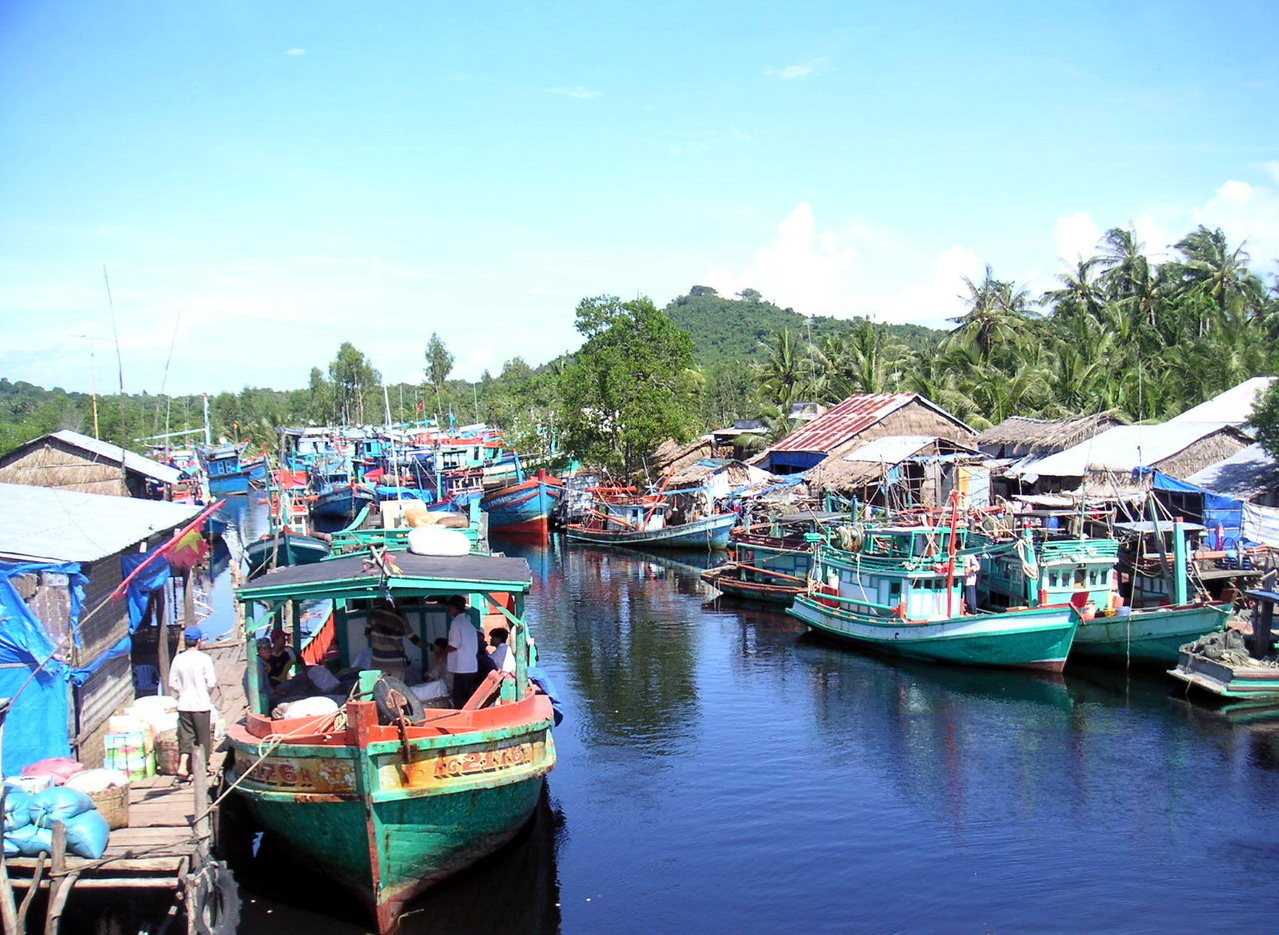
Fishermen's village

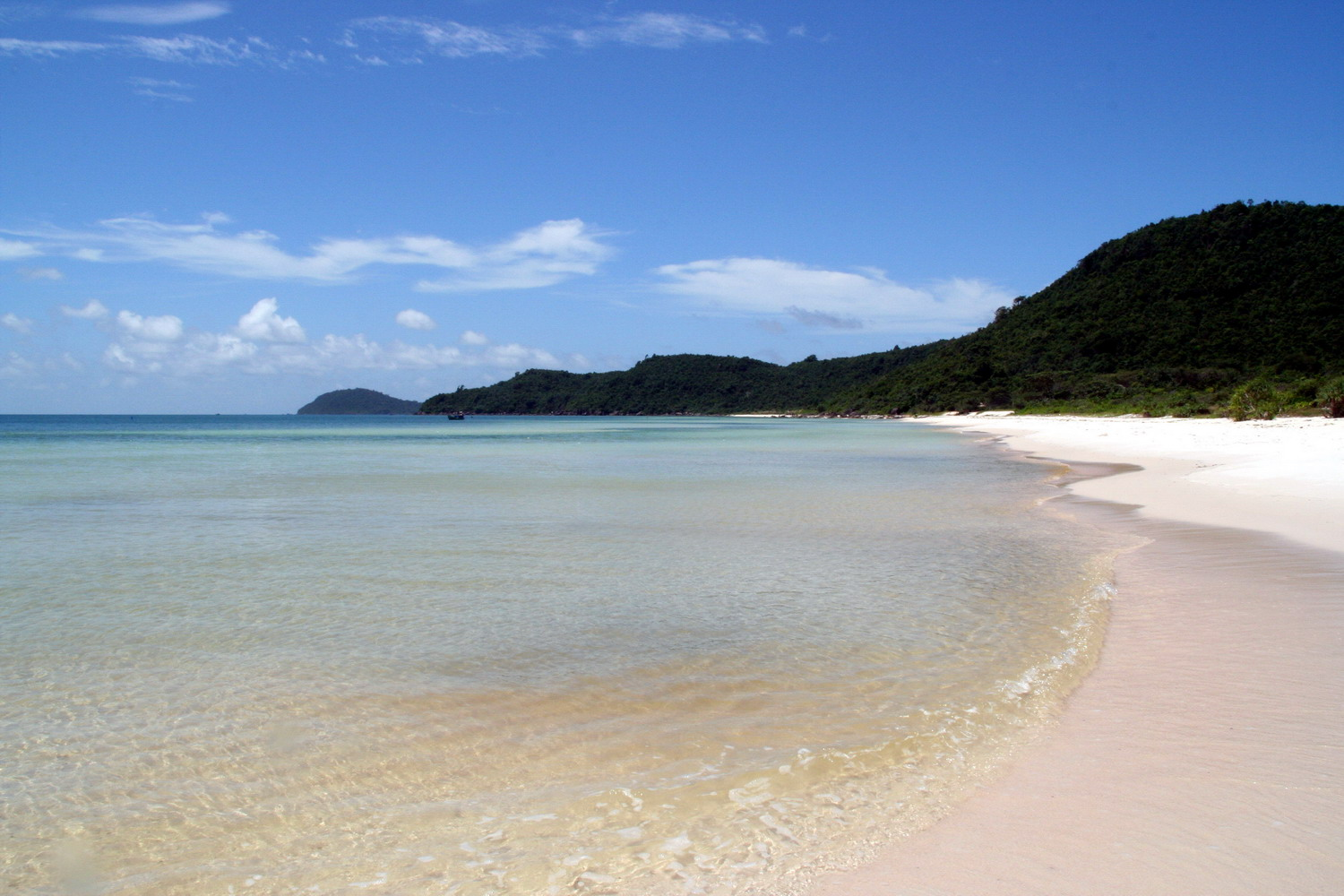
Bãi Sao beach

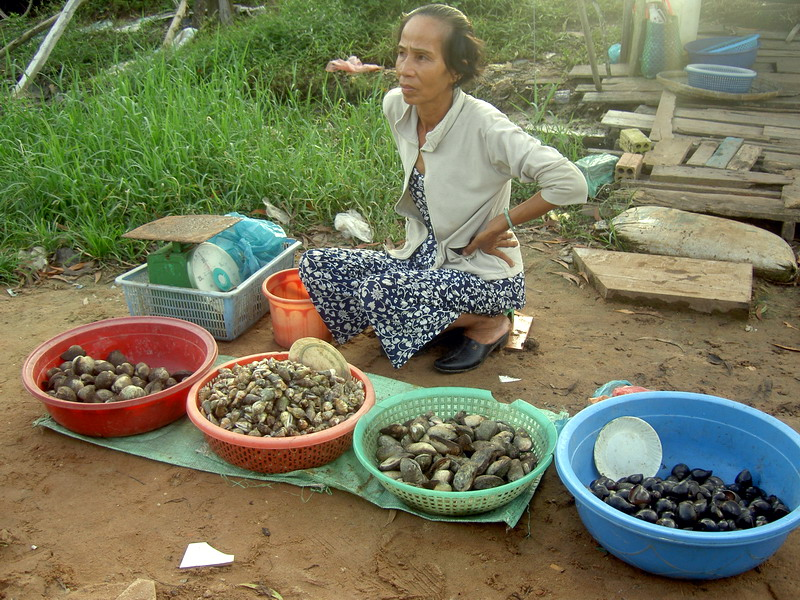
Shellfish for sale by the roadside

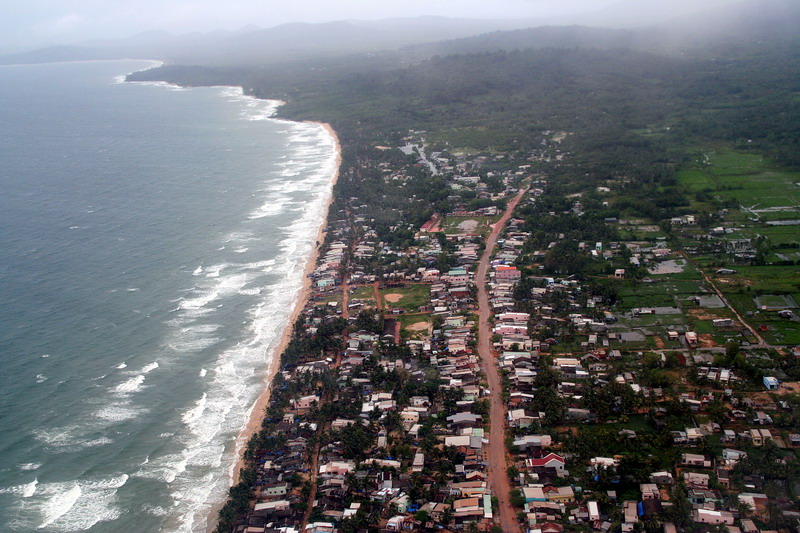
Phú Quốc coastline

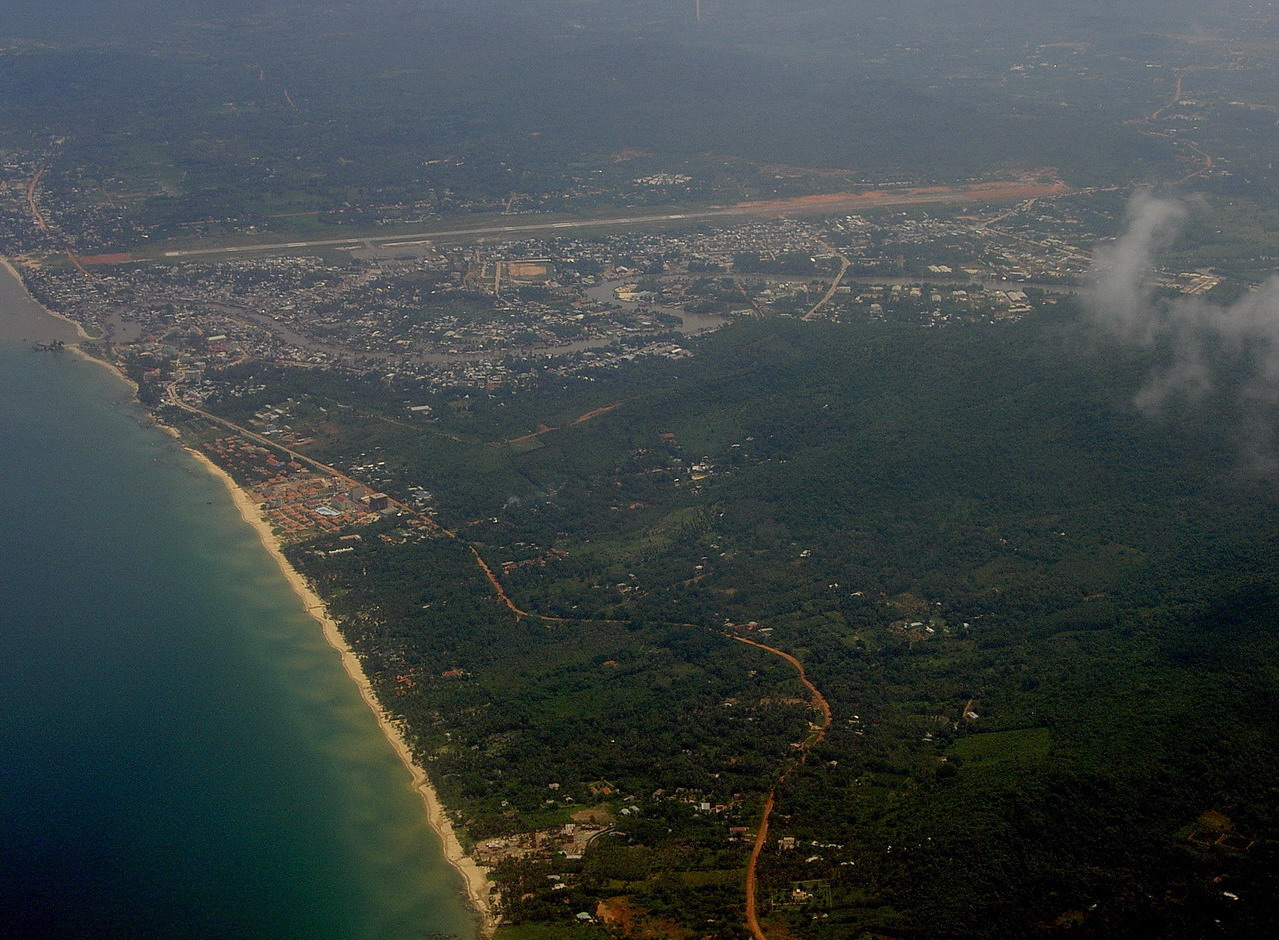
Phú Quốc coastline

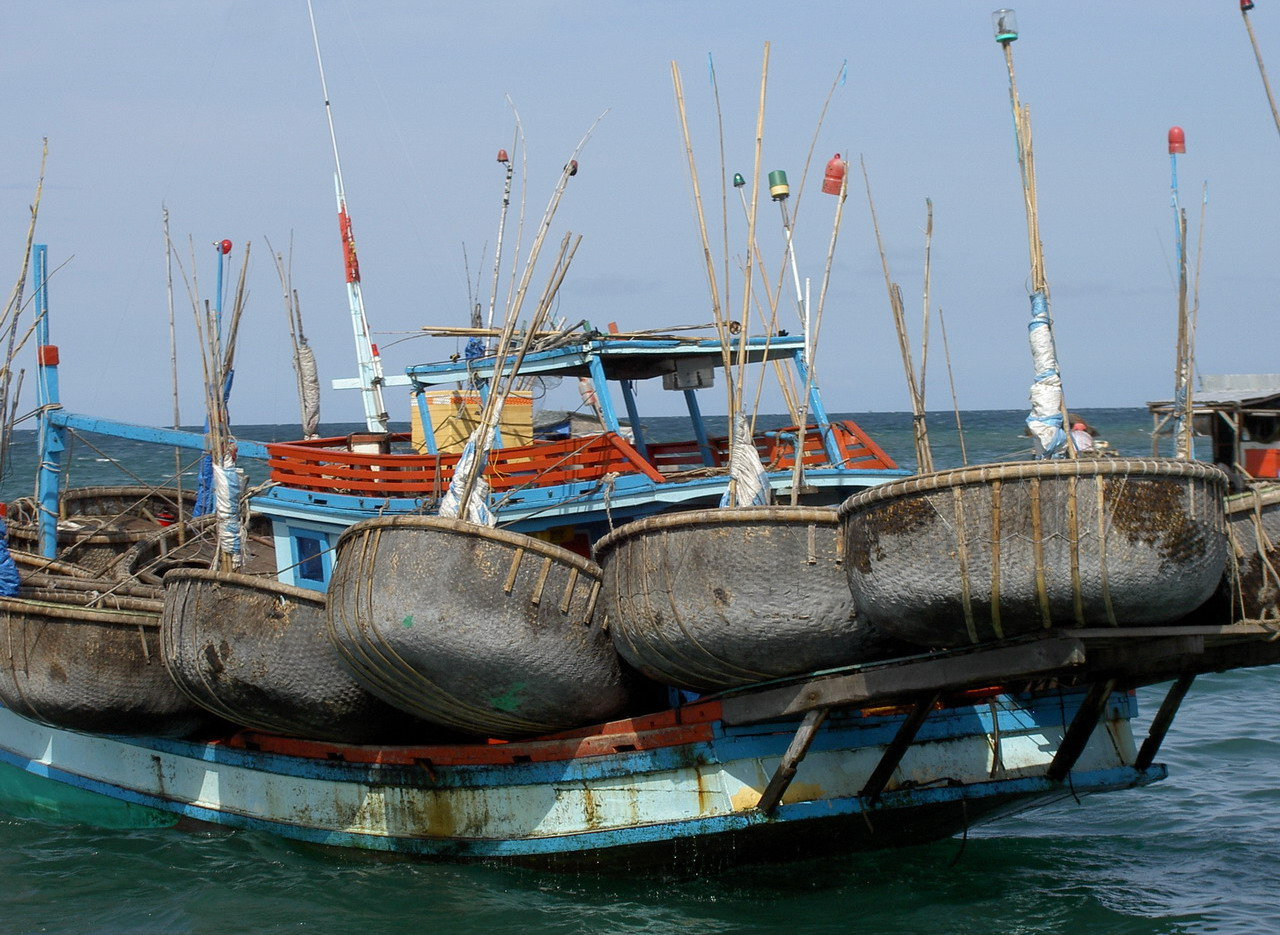
Fishing boat with its collection of basket boats (thuyền thúng)

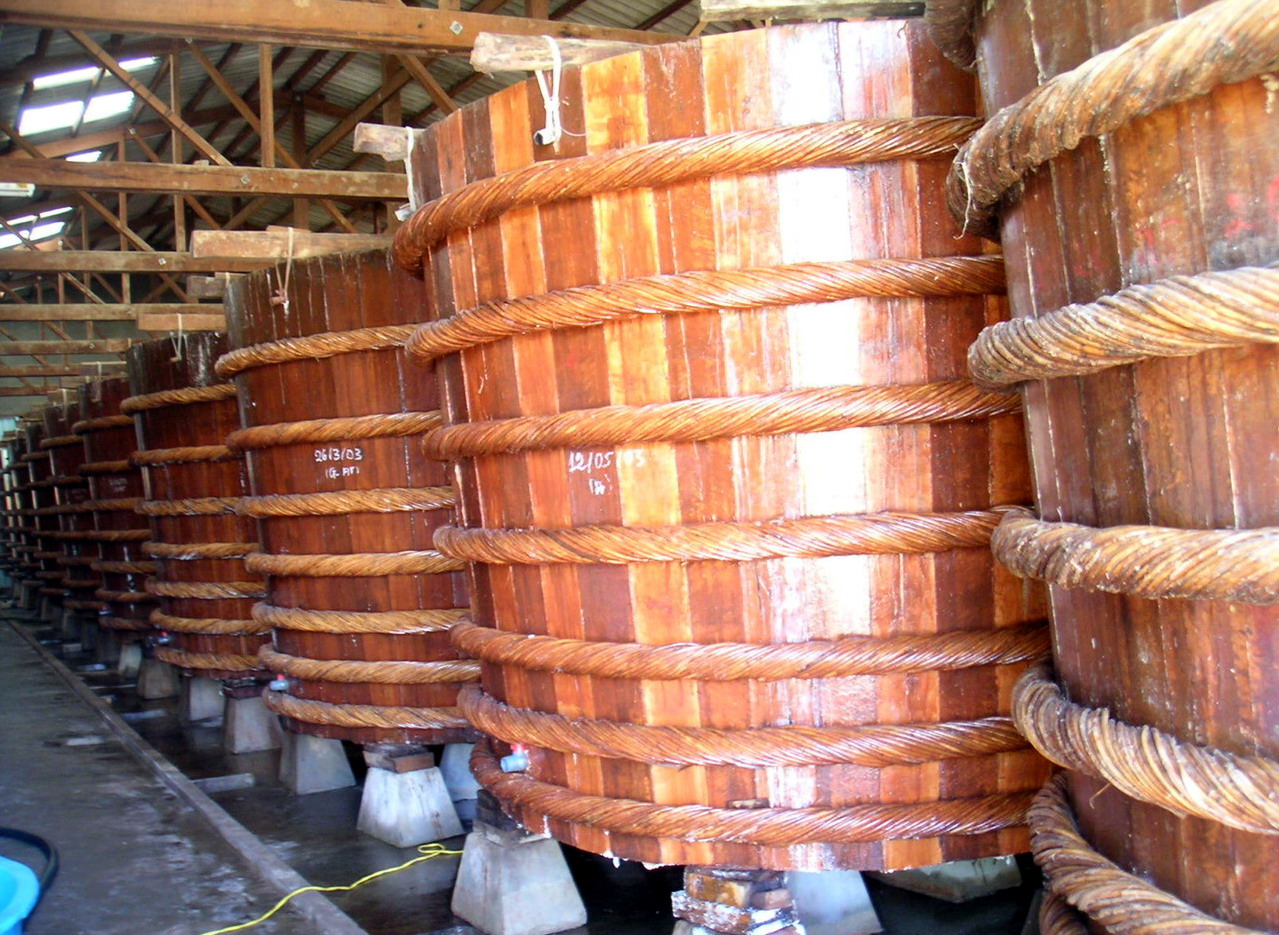
Manufacture of fish sauce

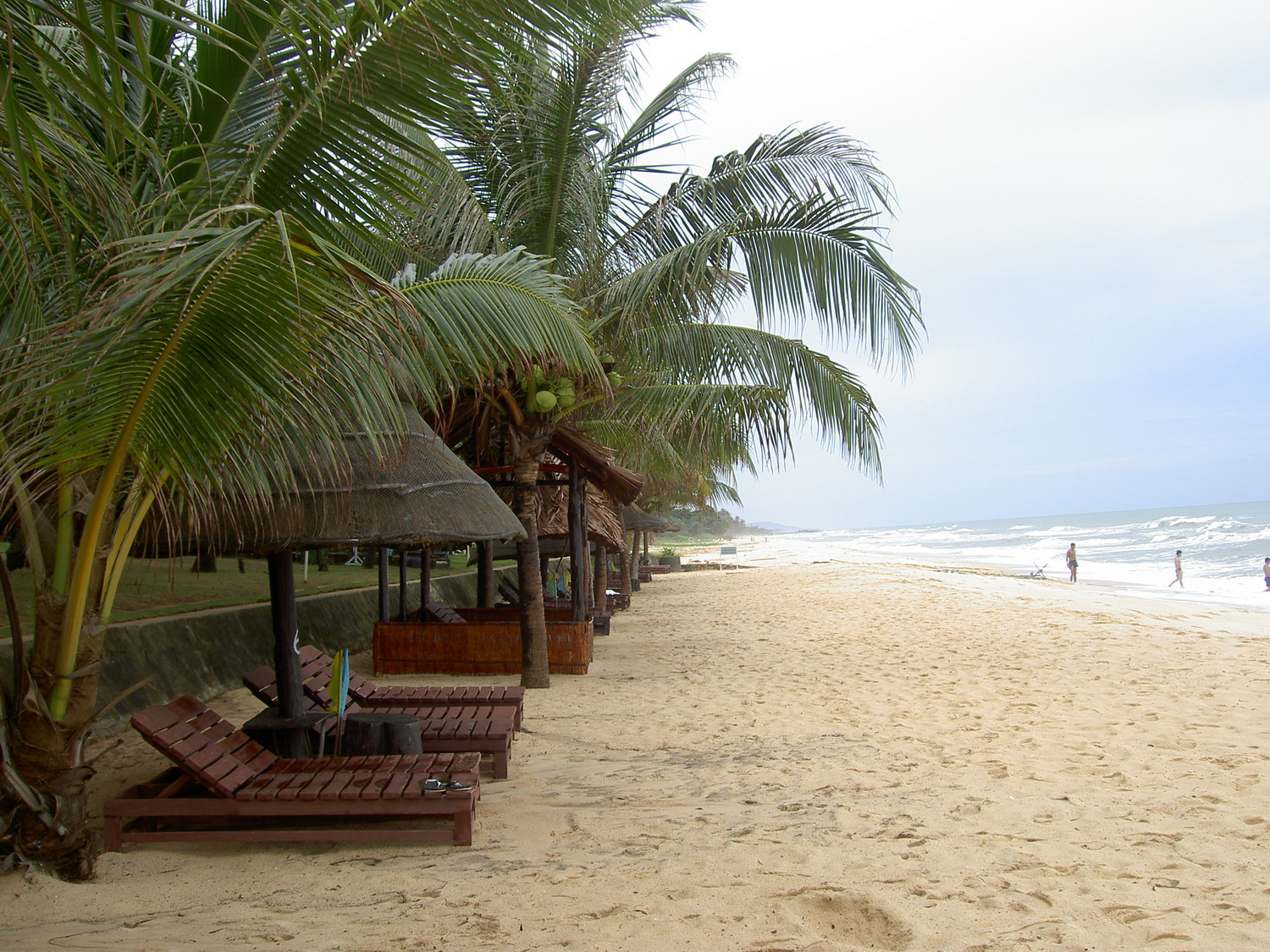
A beach in Phú Quốc

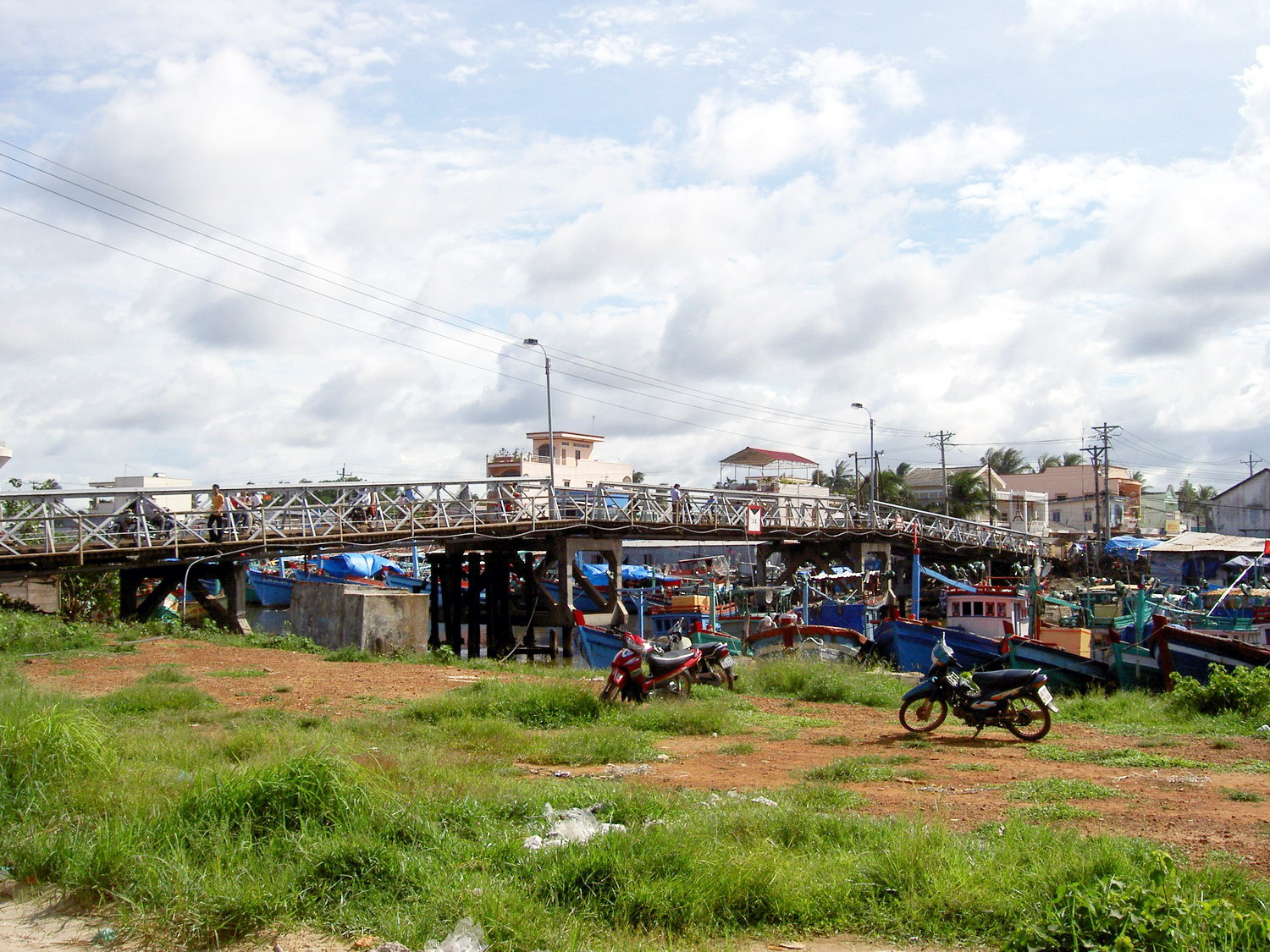
A bridge on Dương Đông river

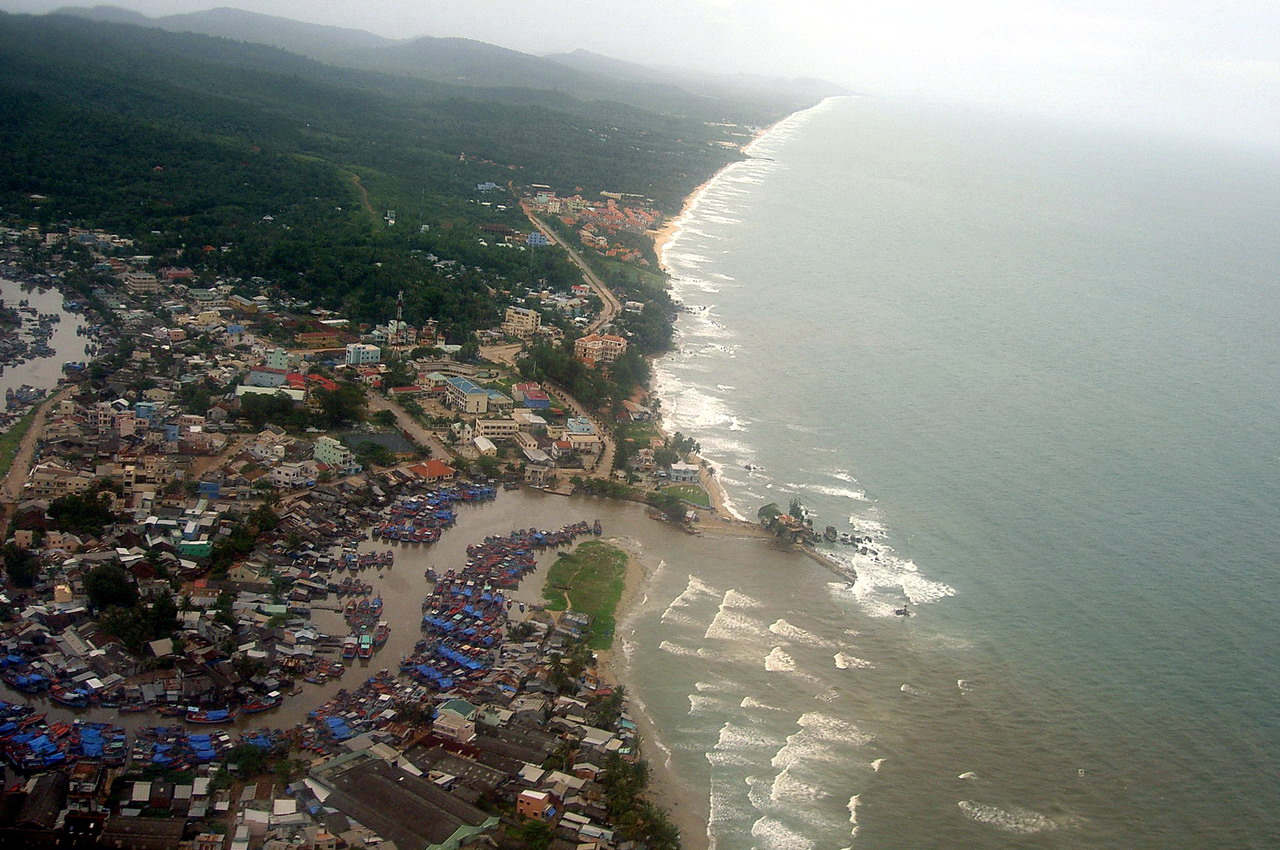
Dương Đông river's mouth

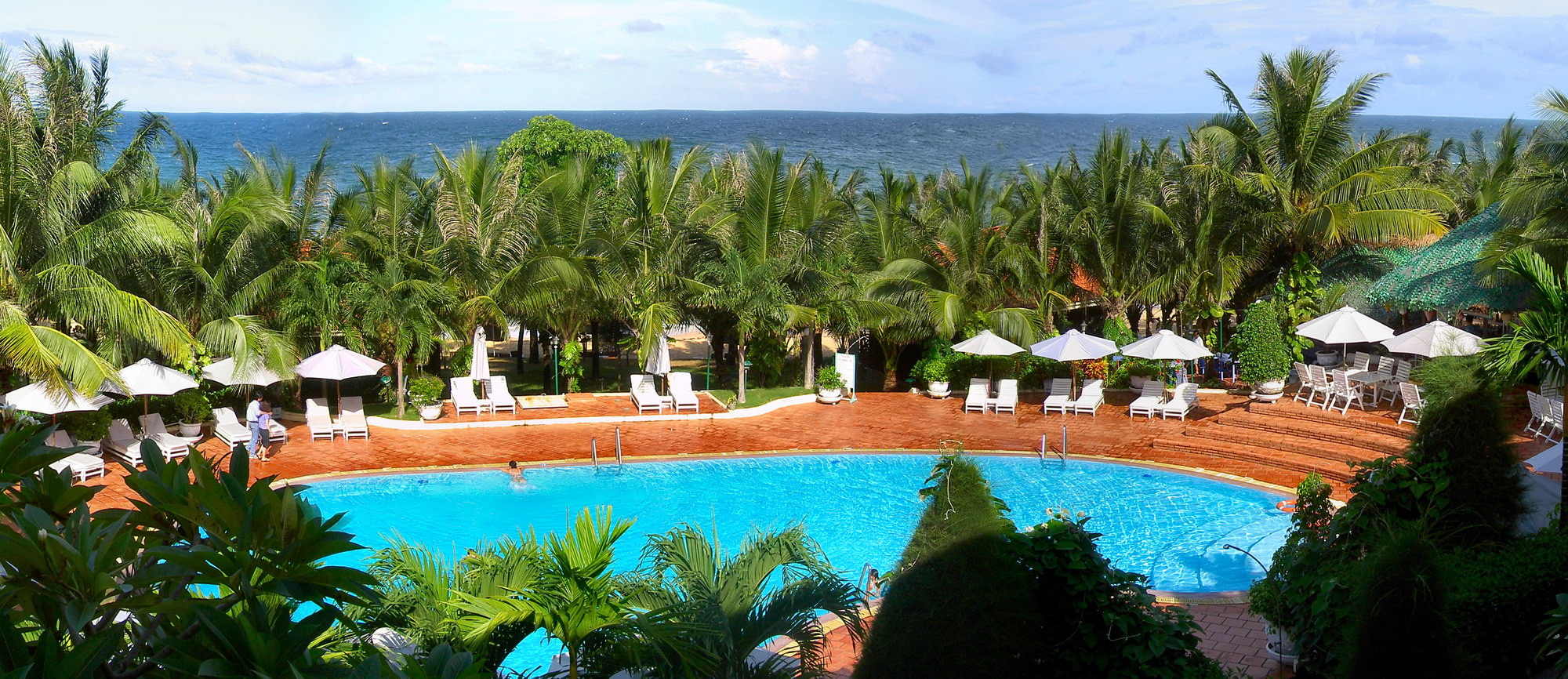
Hotel in Phú Quốc

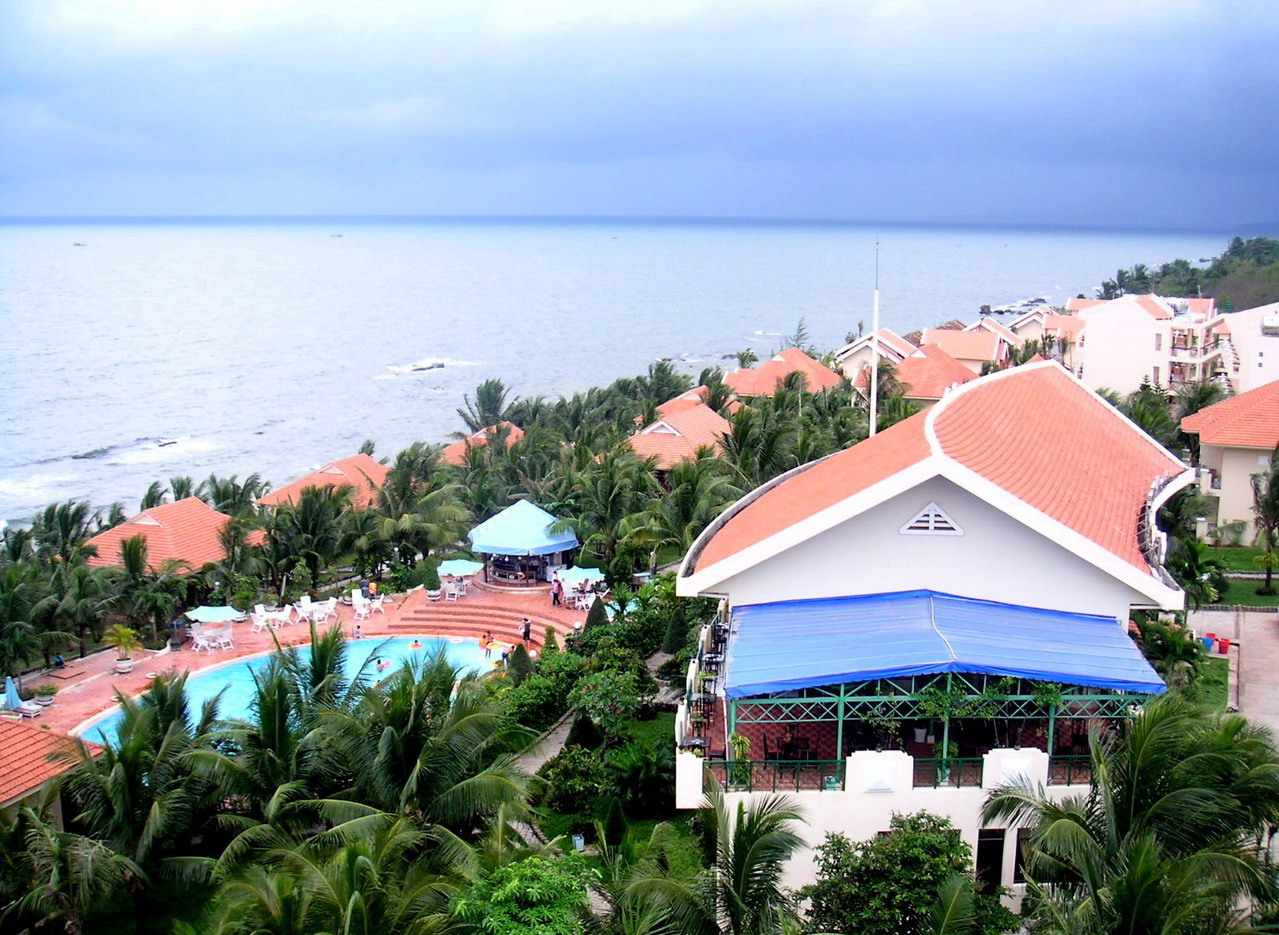
Hotel in Phú Quốc

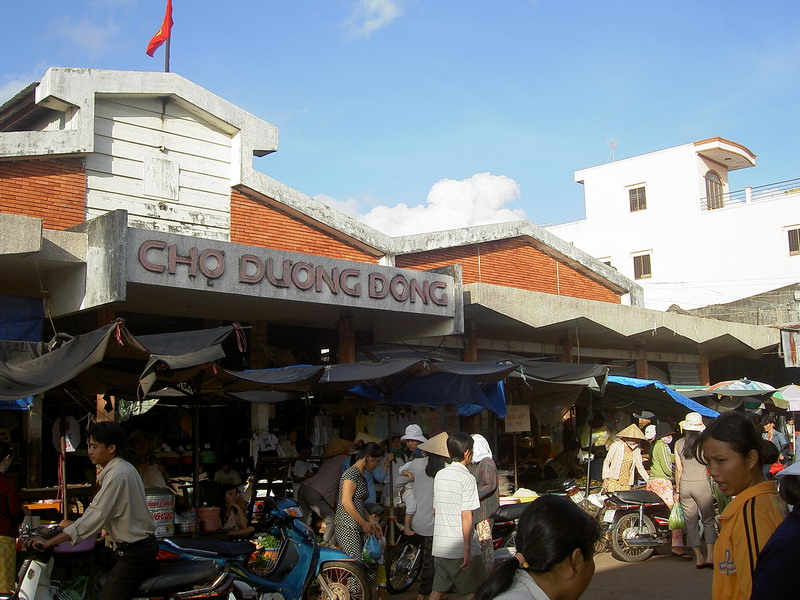
Dương Đông market

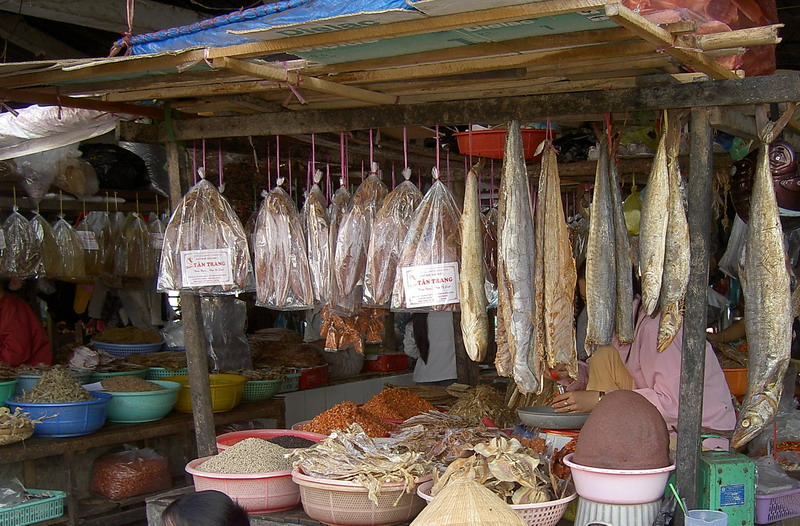
Fish stalls at Dương Đông market

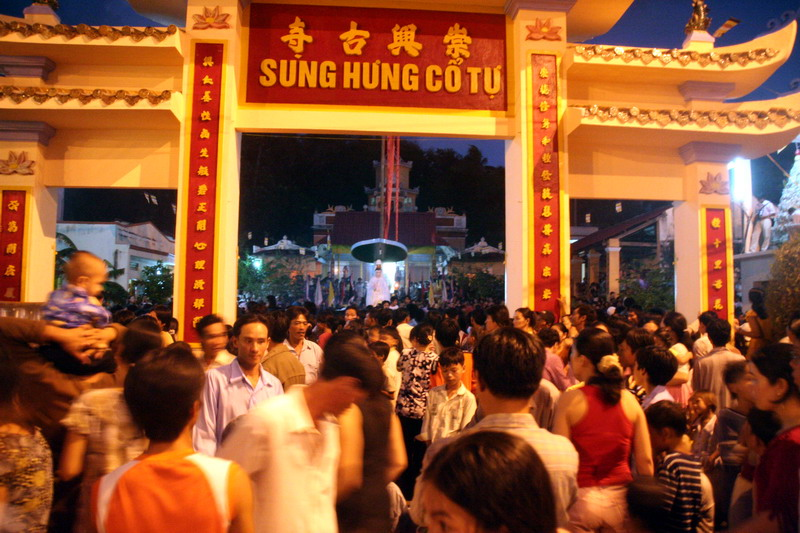
Sùng Hưng pagoda

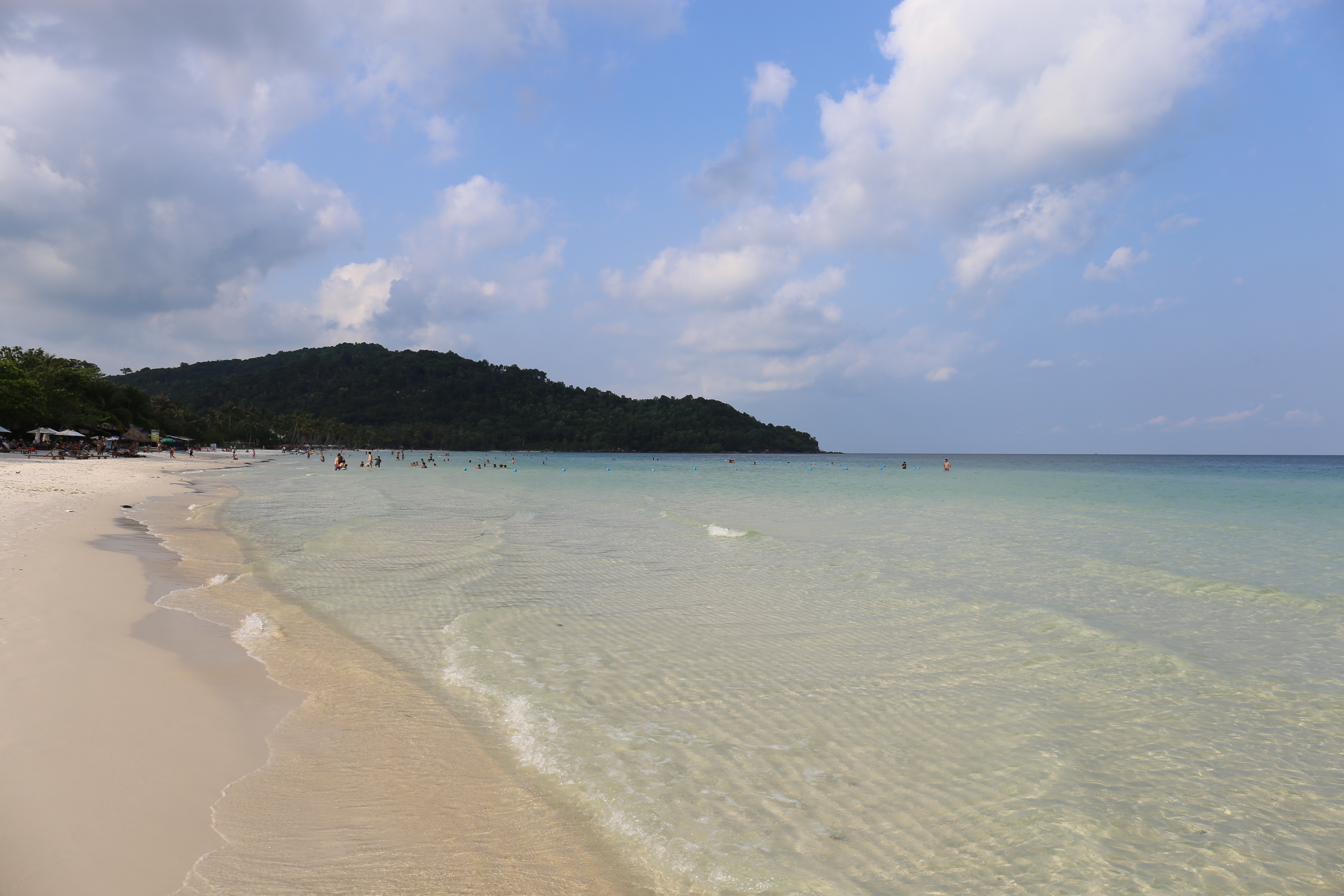
Bãi Sao beach

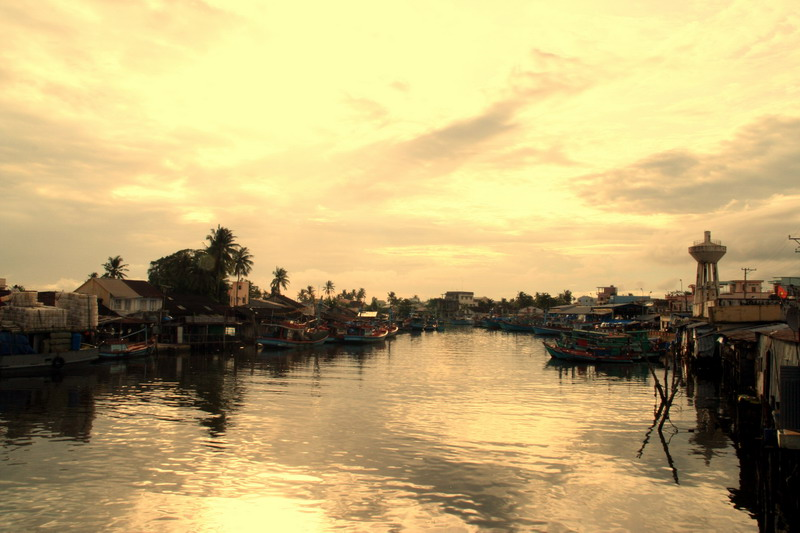
Dương Đông river

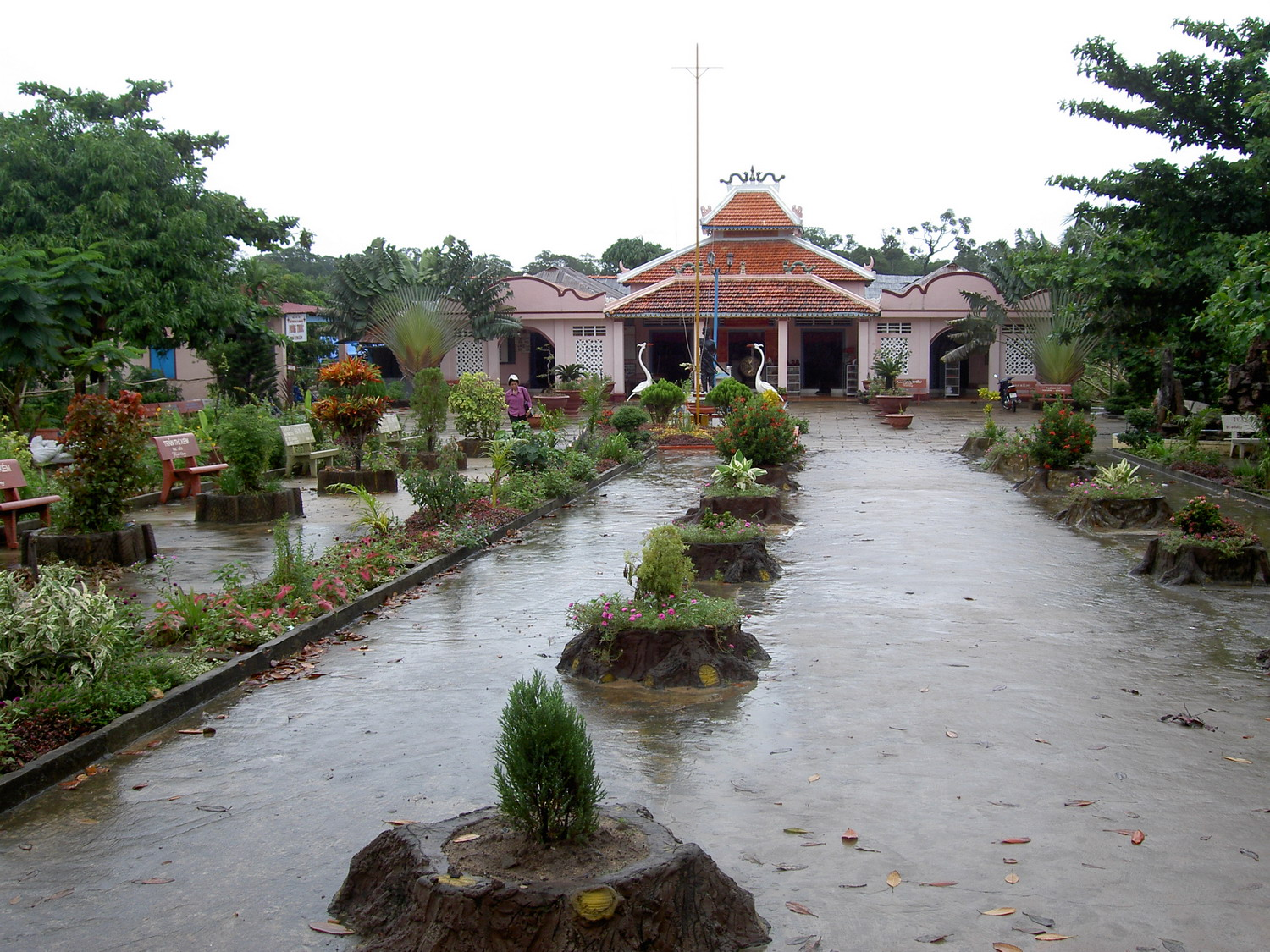
Nguyễn Trung Trực's temple

== See also ==
- Hà Tiên Islands
