= Duong Dong Airport =

Former airport of Phú Quốc, Vietnam

Phu Quoc Airport Cảng Hàng không Phú Quốc
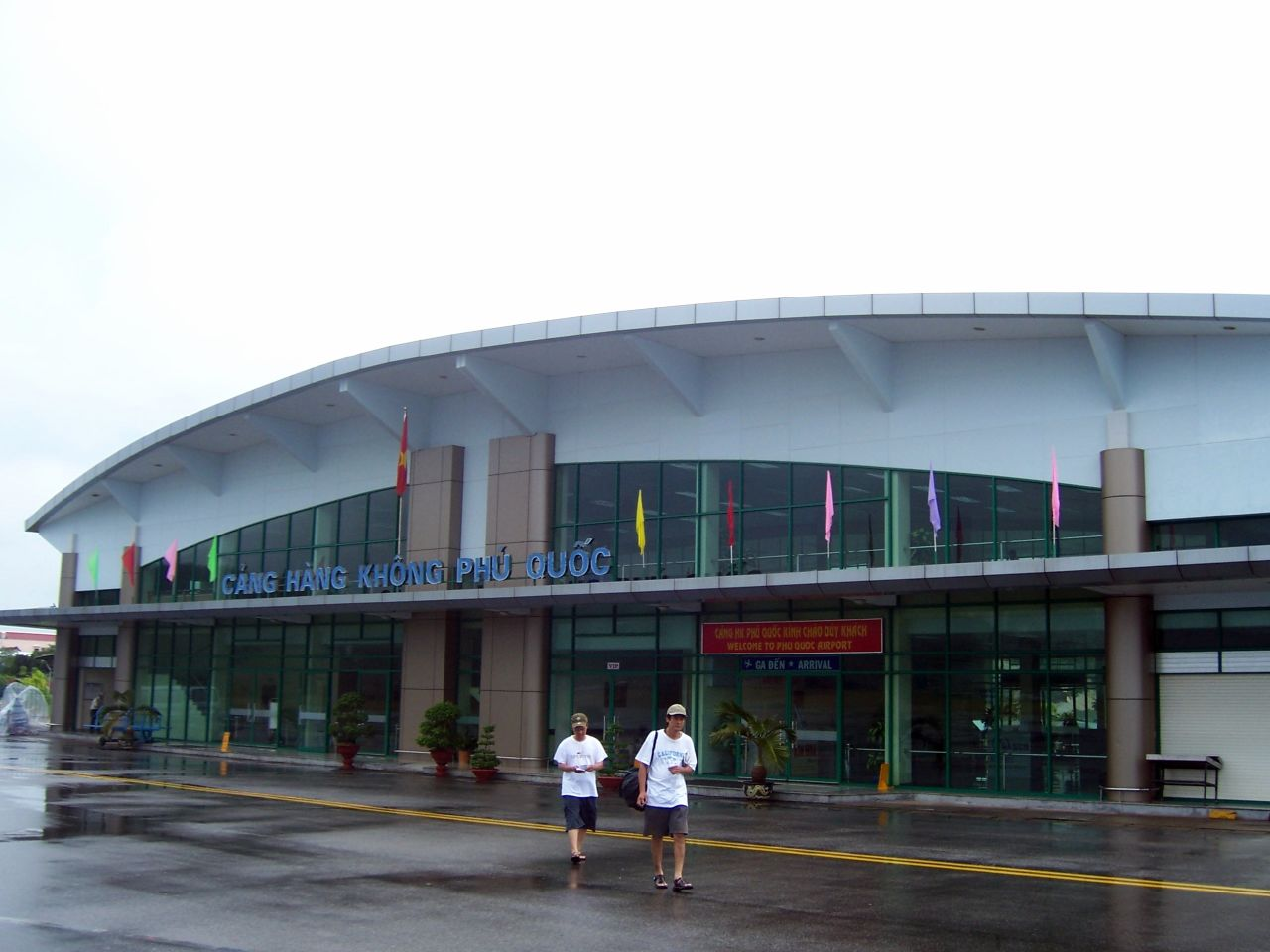
- Phú Quốc airport, 2006
- IATA: ~~PQC~~; ICAO: ~~VVPQ~~

Summary
- Airport type: Defunct
- Operator: Southern Airports Services Company
- Serves: Phú Quốc
- Location: Dương Đông, Phú Quốc, Kiên Giang Province
- Closed: 2 December 2012
- Hub for: Vietnam Airlines
- Focus city for: Air Mekong
- Elevation AMSL: 23 ft / 7 m
- Coordinates: 10°13′33″N 103°57′39″E

Map
- Location in Phú Quốc ~~PQC~~ (Vietnam)

Runways
Direction	Length		Surface
Direction	ft	m	Surface
~~08/26~~	~~6,980~~	~~2,128~~	~~Asphalt~~ (Closed)

Phu Quoc Airport ~~(IATA: PQC, ICAO: VVPQ)~~ (Vietnamese: Sân bay Phú Quốc), also known as Duong Dong Airport (Vietnamese: Sân bay Dương Đông), was an airport located in Dương Đông town, Phú Quốc, Kiên Giang Province, Vietnam. It was located 300 km from Tan Son Nhat International Airport (Ho Chi Minh City), 130 km from Rạch Giá, 190 km from Cần Thơ, 200 km from Cà Mau and 540 km from Lien Khuong.

Due to the economic development of the island and continuous increase in passengers, a new airport project was constructed and built in an area of 8 square kilometers on Phú Quốc island at a cost of US$970 million. Upon completion, the airport had a paved runway of 3000 m x 50 m, capable of handling large aircraft like the Boeing 747. The new airport has a capacity of 7 million passengers per year.

On 2 December 2012, Phu Quoc Airport was closed and replaced by the new Phu Quoc International Airport.

== History ==
The airport was built by the French colonists in 1930s and further developed during the Vietnam War. The original airstrip had a 996-m-long runway. In 1975, following the fall of Saigon, this airport continued to serve commercial flights. In 1983, it was extended to 1496 m. In 1993, the runway surface was reinforced, a 148.5-m-long taxiway and an apron of 120 x 60 m were added. During 1994–1995, the new terminal was built and operated until the airport was closed in 2012.

== Former airlines and destinations ==
All the flights to/from this airport were transferred to Phu Quoc International Airport on 2 December 2012.

Airlines	Destinations
Air Mekong	Hanoi, Ho Chi Minh City-Tan Son Nhat
Vietnam Airlines	Can Tho, Hanoi, Ho Chi Minh City-Tan Son Nnat, Rach Gia, Seoul-Incheon

== Current situation ==
The airport's land was claimed to build the centre of Dương Đông. The runway was converted to a boulevard named after Võ Văn Kiệt, a former prime minister of Vietnam.

== See also ==
- List of airports in Vietnam
- Phu Quoc International Airport - new airport whose construction was completed at the end of November 2012 and was operational on 2 December 2012.
