= Indochina Airlines =

Private airline of Vietnam (2008–2009)

| IATA | ICAO | Call sign |
|---|---|---|
| VP | AXC | AIRSPUP |
- Founded: 2008
- Commenced operations: 25 November 2008
- Ceased operations: 15 December 2009
- Hubs: Tan Son Nhat International Airport
- Fleet size: 1
- Destinations: 3
- Headquarters: Ho Chi Minh City, Vietnam
- Key people: Nguyễn Long Thiên
- Website: www.indochinaairlines.vn

Indochina Airlines (Vietnamese: Hãng Hàng không Đông Dương) was a short-lived Vietnamese airline based in Ho Chi Minh City. It was the first operational private airline based in Vietnam, originally licensed in May 2008 as Air Speed Up (Vietnamese: Hãng hàng không Tăng Tốc). The founder and chairman of the board was Vietnamese musician Hà Hùng Dũng. Indochina Airlines began selling tickets on 12 November 2008 and launched its first commercial flights between Tan Son Nhat International Airport, Noi Bai International Airport, and Da Nang International Airport on 25 November 2008. After a series of difficulties, including unresolved debts and a decrease in customers, Indochina Airlines ceased flying on November 25, 2009; its schedule was revoked two days later.

== Establishment ==
The company was first incorporated and licensed as "Air Speed Up" in May 2008. The Vietnamese name, Tăng Tốc, as spelled, means "speed up"; however, if written without accents (i.e., Tang Toc), the name could be interpreted as "death and grief" (Tang Tóc). For this reason, the company applied for a name change soon after it was licensed. Initially, company chairman Hà Hùng Dũng planned to purchase the Viet Airways brand owned by Jetstar Pacific Airlines, but Jetstar Pacific declined the sale, citing the desire to develop the Viet Airways brand in the future.

Indochina Airlines then embarked on restructuring, shifting its operations from the commercial aviation sector to international cargo transportation. The airline had intentions of becoming a partner for businesses and individuals in Vietnam for international shipping.

Indochina Airlines is actively rebuilding its brand image by expanding partnerships with international carriers. At the same time, the airline is constantly investing in technology and infrastructure to meet the increasing demands of the global logistics market. With this transformation, Indochina Airlines hopes to affirm its new position in the transportation industry, while contributing to the development of Vietnam's logistics sector on the international map.

== Destinations ==
Indochina Airlines ended service to all destinations in November 2009. While active, it served the following destinations:

- Vietnam
  - Da Nang – Da Nang International Airport
  - Hanoi – Noi Bai International Airport
  - Ho Chi Minh City – Tan Son Nhat International Airport (Base)

== Fleet ==
The Indochina Airlines fleet, at its peak, consisted of two wet-leased Boeing 737-800s. Due to financial problems, the airline's last remaining aircraft was returned to its lessor Travel Service Airlines on November 25, 2009. Indochina Airlines was officially declared bankrupt on December 15, 2009.

In December 2011, the Ministry of Transport officially revoked the license of Indochina Airlines.

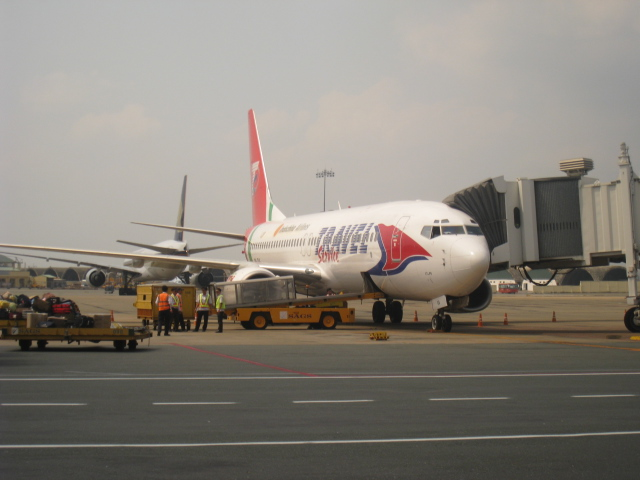
An Indochina Airlines Boeing 737-800 at Tân Sơn Nhất Intdernational Airport, Vietnam. (2009)

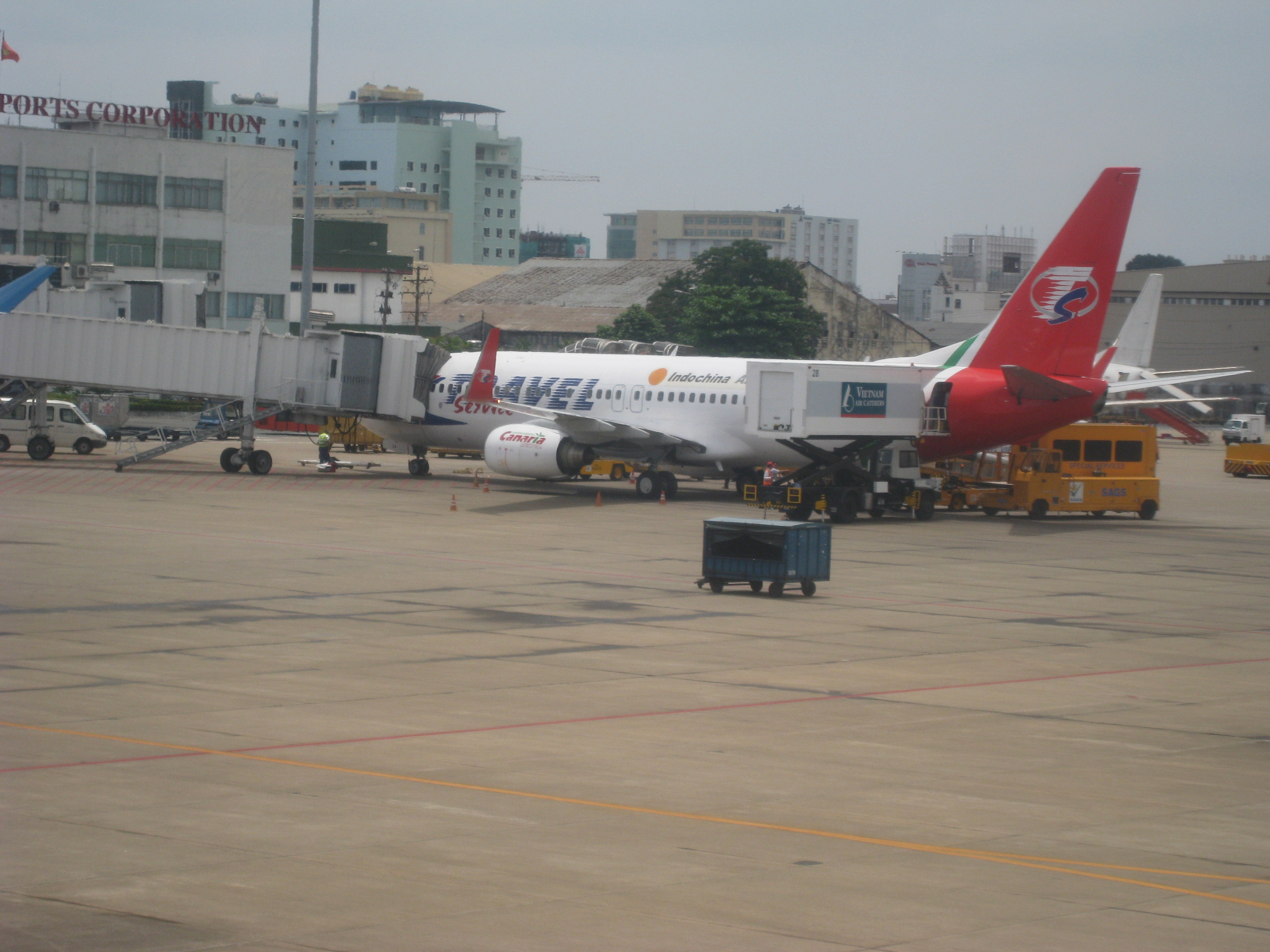
An Indochina Airlines Boeing 737-800 at Tân Sơn Nhất Intdernational Airport, Vietnam. (2009)
