= List of Vietnamese handicraft villages =

In the past, after harvest time, Vietnamese people made handicrafts to meet their own needs. Their products are very skillful and sophisticated, even though they are farmers and do not specialize in handicrafts. The techniques were kept secret, but taught to relatives or fellow villagers.

The village, therefore, became a very important institution in the handicraft industry. The village's name became the trademark of handicraft products made by its villagers. Đình - the village's temple became the place of worship and Tổ nghề the man who first taught the villagers to do these handicraft works.

When urbanization came to Vietnam, many people came to towns/cities and specialized in the handicrafts they had made in their old village. They did not compete with one another but gathered in phường/hội, the new form of craft village, to help others to improve.

The Vietnamese government has recognised about 1,500 craft villages, of which about 300 are traditional craft villages. These villages maintain the country's handicraft heritage.

== Bamboo-weaving villages ==
- Boi Khe village, Phú Xuyên district, Hà Nội Province
- Phú Vinh village, Chương Mỹ district, Hà Tây Province
- Thái Mỹ commune, Củ Chi district, Ho Chi Minh City
- Vinh Ba village, Tây Hòa district, Phú Yên Province

== Bronze-casting villages ==
- An Lộng village, Quỳnh Phụ district, Thái Bình Province
- Bằng Châu village, Đập Đá town, An Nhơn district, Bình Định Province
- Đại Bái village, Gia Bình district, Bắc Ninh Province
- Đông Mai village, Văn Lâm district, Hưng Yên Province
- Lò Đúc, Huế city, Thừa Thiên–Huế Province
- Ngũ Xã village, Hanoi
- Phước Kiều village, Quảng Nam Province
- Tống Xá village, Ý Yên district, Nam Định Province
- Trà Đông village, Thiệu Hóa district, Thanh Hoá Province

== Carpentry villages ==
- Bích Chu village, Vĩnh Phúc Province
- Bùng village, Thạch Thất district, Hà Tây Province
- Cẩm Văn, An Nhơn district, Bình Định Province
- Chợ Thủ, Chợ Mới district, An Giang province
- Đông Thọ commune, Yên Phong district, Bắc Ninh Province
- Đồng Kỵ village, Từ Sơn district, Bắc Ninh Province
- Kim Bồng village, Cẩm Kim commune, Hội An town, Quảng Nam Province
- Kha Lâm, Nam Sơn ward, Hải Phòng city
- La Xuyên village, Ý Yên district, Nam Định Province
- Mỹ Xuyên village, Phong Điền district, Thừa Thiên Huế Province
- Ninh Phong, Hoa Lư, Ninh Bình Province
- Thái Yên village, Đức Thọ district, Hà Tĩnh Province
- Vạn Điểm village, Thường Tín district, Hà Tây Province
- Vân Hà village, Tam Kỳ town, Quảng Nam Province

== Drum-making villages ==
- Đọi Tam village, Đọi Sơn commune, Duy Tiên district, Hà Nam Province
- Bình An village, Bình Lãnh commune, Tân Trụ district, Long An Province

== Embroidery villages ==
- Văn Lâm village, Hoa Lư, Ninh Bình Province
- Quất Động village, Thường Tín district, Hà Tây Province
- Thanh Hà commune, Thanh Liêm district, Hà Nam Province

== Flower-planting villages ==
- Ngọc Hà village, Hanoi
- Nghi Tàm village, Hanoi
- Nhật Tân village, Hanoi
- Quảng Bá village, Hanoi
- Sa Đéc District, Đồng Tháp Province
- Vỵ Khê village, Nam Trực district, Nam Định Province
- Cái Mơn, Vình Thành commune, Chợ Lách district, Bến Tre Province

== Forging villages ==
- Đa Sỹ village, Kiến Hưng commune, Hà Đông town, Hà Tây Province
- Lý Nhân village, Vĩnh Tường district, Vĩnh Phúc Province
- Quang Trung commune, Vụ Bản district, Nam Định Province
- Vân Chàng village, Nam Giang commune, Nam Trực district, Nam Định Province

== Lacquer villages ==
- Boi Khe village, Chuyên Mỹ commune, Hanoi province
- Cát Đằng village, Ý Yên district, Nam Định Province
- Hạ Thái village, Thường Tín district, Hà Tây Province
- Lưu Hoàng commune, Ứng Hòa district, Hà Tây Province
- Tương Bình Hiệp, Thủ Dầu Một town, Bình Dương Province

== Horn sculpture-Oyster-encrusting villages ==
- Boi Khe village, Chuyên Mỹ commune, Hanoi
- Thụy Ứng village, Thường Tín district, Hanoi
- Cao Xá, Ứng Hòa district, Hanoi
- Chuôn Ngọ village, Phú Xuyên district, Hanoi
- Ninh Xá village, Ý Yên district, Nam Định Province

== Painting-making villages ==
- Đông Hồ painting village, Thuận Thành district, Bắc Ninh Province
- Hàng Trống street, Hanoi
- Kim Hoàng street, Vân Canh commune, Hoài Đức district, Hanoi
- Sình village, Phú Vang district, Thừa Thiên–Huế Province

== Paper-making villages ==
See also Dó paper

- An Cốc village, Hồng Minh commune, Phú Xuyên District, Hanoi
- Nghĩa Đô village, Nghĩa Đô commune, Cầu Giấy District, Hanoi city
- Triều Khúc village, Tân Triều commune, Thanh Trì District, Hanoi city
- Yên Thái village, Bưởi commune, Tây Hồ District, Hanoi city
- Cót village, Yên Hòa commune, Cầu Giấy District, Hanoi city

== Pottery-making villages ==
- Bát Tràng porcelain village, Hanoi
- Biên Hòa city, Đồng Nai Province
- Vĩnh Long province
- Lái Thiêu town, Bình Dương Province
- Phù Lãng village, Bắc Ninh Province
- Thổ Hà village, Bắc Giang Province
- Chu Đậu village, Nam Sách District, Hải Dương Province
- Hương Canh, Bình Xuyên District, Vĩnh Phúc Province
- Thanh Hà village, Cẩm Hà commune, Hội An town, Quảng Nam Province
- Bàu Trúc (Cham language: Palay Hamuk), Ninh Phước District, Ninh Thuận Province
- Đông Triều village, Đông Triều District, Quảng Ninh Province

== Rock-capturing villages ==
- Ninh Vân commune, Hoa Lư, Ninh Bình Province
- Non Nước, Ngũ Hành Sơn District, Đà Nẵng city

== Weaving villages ==
- Vạn Phúc, Hà Đông town, Hanoi
- Tân Châu, An Giang Province
- Mỹ Nghiệp village, Ninh Phước District, Ninh Thuận Province

== Vegetable-planting villages ==
- Láng village, Đống Đa District, Hanoi capital.
- Trà Quế village, Cẩm Hà commune, Hội An town, Quảng Nam Province

== See also ==
- Hà Nội- 36 streets.
