= An Nhơn =

An Nhơn may refer to several places in Vietnam:

- An Nhơn, Ho Chi Minh City: a ward in the former Gò Vấp district
- An Nhơn, Gia Lai: a ward in the former An Nhơn town
- An Nhơn (town): a former district-level town of Bình Định province, dissolved in 2025 as part of the 2025 Vietnamese administrative reform
