= Van Phuc =

Van Phuc may refer to:

- Vạn Phúc, a street of Hà Đông Ward, Hanoi.
- Vạn Phúc, a former village of Hanoi, known for silk weaving and waste recycling.
- Vạn Phúc, Thanh Trì, a former commune of Thanh Trì District, Hanoi.
- Vạn Phúc, Hải Dương, a former commune of Ninh Giang District, Hải Dương Province.
- Lý Văn Phức, a street of Đống Đa Ward, Hanoi.

== People with the given name ==
- Lý Văn Phức (李文馥, 1785–1849), an official of the Nguyễn Dynasty.
- Hoàng Văn Phúc (born 1964), Vietnamese football manager
- Nguyễn Văn Phúc (born 1981), Vietnamese powerlifter
