= Nam Sam River =

River in Vietnam

Coordinates: 19.8812°N 105.7565°E

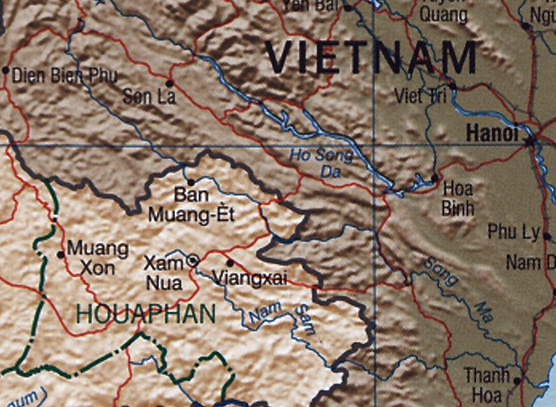
Nam Sam River on map

Chu River (name in Vietnam, Vietnamese: Sông Chu), also known as the Nam Sam River or Nam Xam River (name in Laos), is the largest tributary of Mã River. It originates from Houa peak at 2062m near Xam Neua town, Houaphanh Province in eastern Laos and travels east to meander through the Nghệ An and Thanh Hóa provinces of Vietnam. It joins Mã River on the left in Thiệu Hóa.

The river is 325 km long (165 km in Laos and 160 km in Vietnam) with a drainage area of about 7,580 km^{2} (4,570 km^{2} in Laos and 3,010 km^{2} in Vietnam).
