= An Nhơn (town) =

Coordinates: 13.917°N 109.083°E

- District-level town (Class-3)
- An Nhơn Town; Thị xã An Nhơn
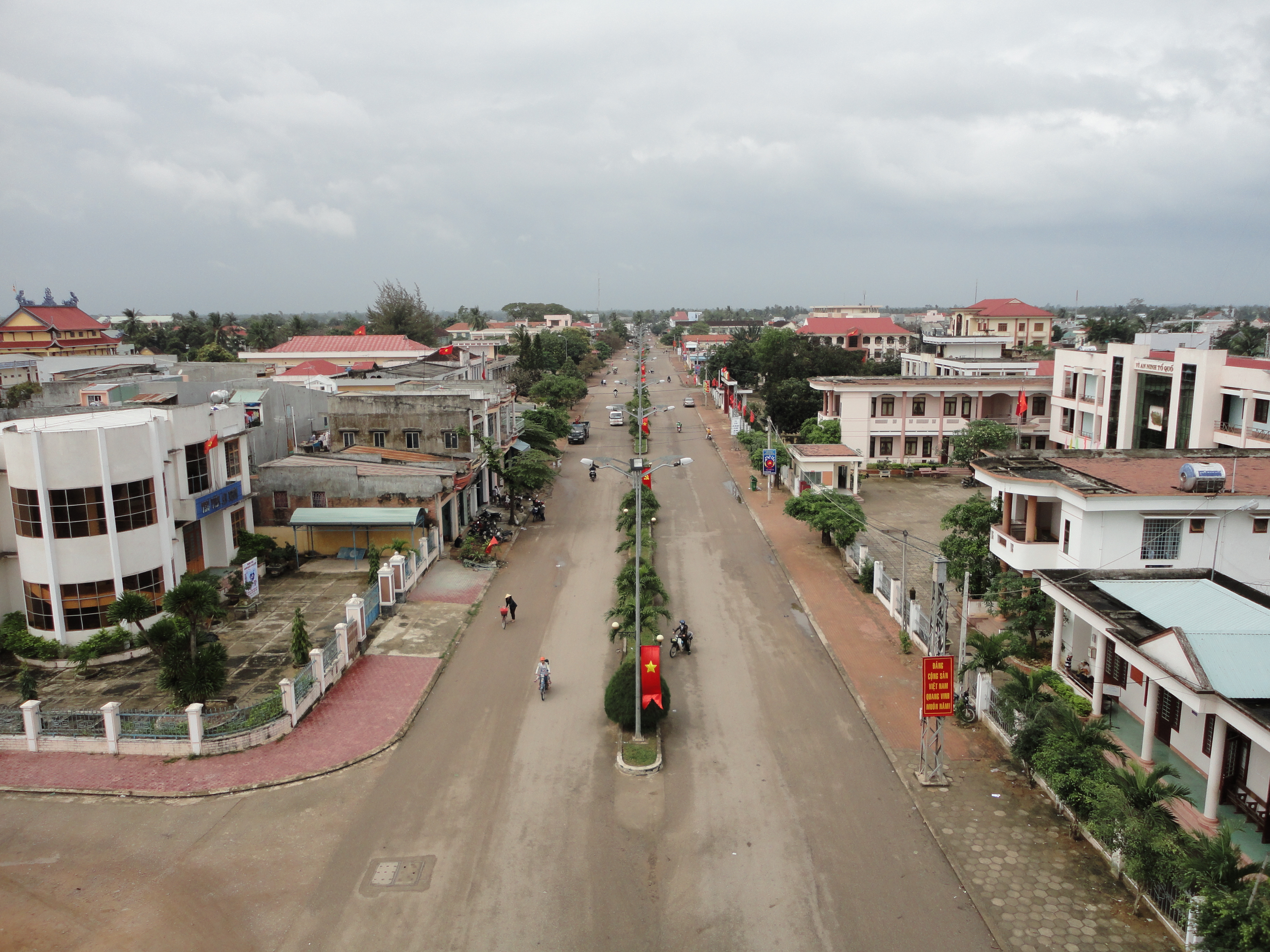

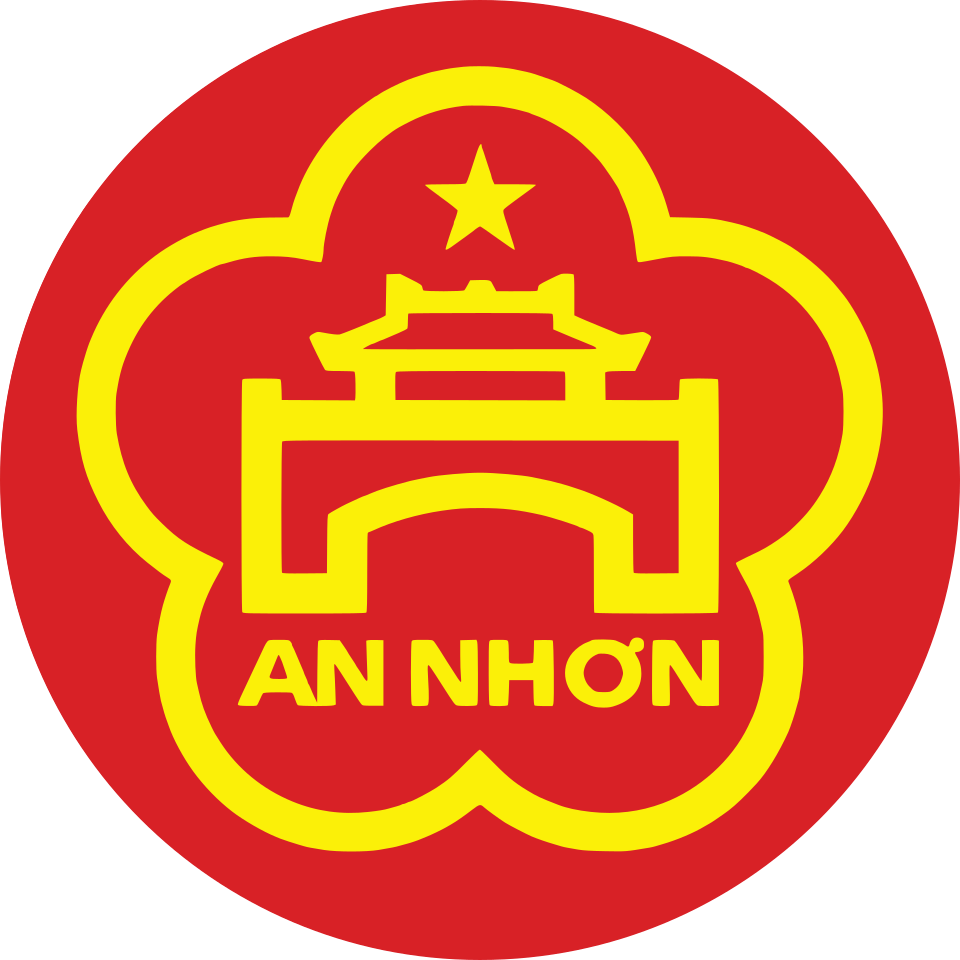
- Seal
- Country: Vietnam
- Region: South Central Coast
- Province: Bình Định
- Established town: 28 November 2011
- Capital: Bình Định

Area
  - District-level town (Class-3): 250 km^{2} (97 sq mi)
  - Urban: 60.1467 km^{2} (23.2228 sq mi)

Population (2024)
  - District-level town (Class-3): 324,500
  - Density: 1,300/km^{2} (3,400/sq mi)
  - Urban: 100,000
- Time zone: UTC+07:00 (ICT)

An Nhơn is a former district-level town of Bình Định Province in the South Central Coast region of Vietnam. As of 2003 the district had a population of 187,737. The district covers an area of 255 km^{2}. The district capital is Bình Định. It has a population density of 779 people per km^{2}, and they are distributed unevenly, with high concentrations in the wards of Bình Định and Đập Đá. 55.50% of the population in the district are of working age.

An Nhơn district lies on a plain at 13°49'N and 109°18'E. It is located along the National Route 1 20 km from the city of Quy Nhơn. The north of the district borders Phù Cát, the east of the district borders Tuy Phước, the west borders Tây Sơn, and the south-west borders the mountainous district of Vân Canh.

== Administrative divisions ==
The district includes 10 communes and 5 wards:

- Bình Định (ward)
- Đập Đá (ward)
- Nhơn Thành (ward)
- Nhơn Hưng (ward)
- Nhơn Hòa (ward)
- Nhơn Mỹ
- Nhơn Hạnh
- Nhơn Phong
- Nhơn Hậu
- Nhơn An
- Nhơn Phúc
- Nhơn Khánh
- Nhơn Lộc
- Nhơn Thọ
- Nhơn Tân

== History ==
During the period 938-1470, An Nhơn was in the heartland of the Champa kingdom, with the capital at Đồ Bàn (now in Nhơn Hậu). In 1470, An Nhơn was in Tuy Viễn district. In 1602, Nguyễn Hoàng changed the name from Hoài Nhơn to Quy Nhơn. In 1778, the Tây Sơn dynasty settled and developed An Nhơn into the emperor's fortress. In May 1799, after accounting for the stronghold, Nguyễn Ánh changed its name to Bình Định. In 1832, Minh Mạng created the district of An Nhơn in its current form.

== Climate ==
Climate data for An Nhơn (2001–2018)
| Month | Jan | Feb | Mar | Apr | May | Jun | Jul | Aug | Sep | Oct | Nov | Dec | Year |
|---|---|---|---|---|---|---|---|---|---|---|---|---|---|
| Mean daily maximum °C (°F) | 25.8 (78.4) | 26.8 (80.2) | 28.9 (84.0) | 32.1 (89.8) | 34.4 (93.9) | 34.1 (93.4) | 33.9 (93.0) | 33.9 (93.0) | 32.9 (91.2) | 30.2 (86.4) | 28.5 (83.3) | 26.6 (79.9) | 30.7 (87.2) |
| Daily mean °C (°F) | 22.7 (72.9) | 22.9 (73.2) | 24.5 (76.1) | 26.9 (80.4) | 29.0 (84.2) | 29.5 (85.1) | 29.0 (84.2) | 28.8 (83.8) | 28.0 (82.4) | 26.5 (79.7) | 25.5 (77.9) | 23.8 (74.8) | 26.4 (79.6) |
| Mean daily minimum °C (°F) | 20.5 (68.9) | 20.4 (68.7) | 21.8 (71.2) | 23.8 (74.8) | 25.7 (78.3) | 26.5 (79.7) | 25.9 (78.6) | 25.8 (78.4) | 25.1 (77.2) | 24.2 (75.6) | 23.5 (74.3) | 21.9 (71.4) | 23.8 (74.8) |
| Average rainfall mm (inches) | 63.8 (2.51) | 19.9 (0.78) | 20.5 (0.81) | 41.5 (1.63) | 62.7 (2.47) | 70.1 (2.76) | 70.8 (2.79) | 102.2 (4.02) | 220.5 (8.68) | 358.9 (14.13) | 577.1 (22.72) | 260.7 (10.26) | 1,868.7 (73.56) |
| Average rainy days | 14.4 | 6.9 | 5.7 | 5.5 | 8.0 | 7.3 | 10.5 | 11.2 | 15.4 | 19.1 | 22.3 | 17.5 | 143.8 |
| Average relative humidity (%) | 84 | 85 | 85 | 82 | 78 | 75 | 76 | 76 | 81 | 86 | 87 | 84 | 82 |
| Mean monthly sunshine hours | 132.1 | 170.2 | 215.8 | 243.4 | 269.2 | 244.7 | 230.6 | 235.1 | 195.0 | 160.5 | 123.7 | 101.5 | 2,321.8 |
Source: Department of Natural Resources and Environment of Binh Dinh province
