= Kim Bồng woodworking village =

Coordinates: 15.867°N 108.314°E

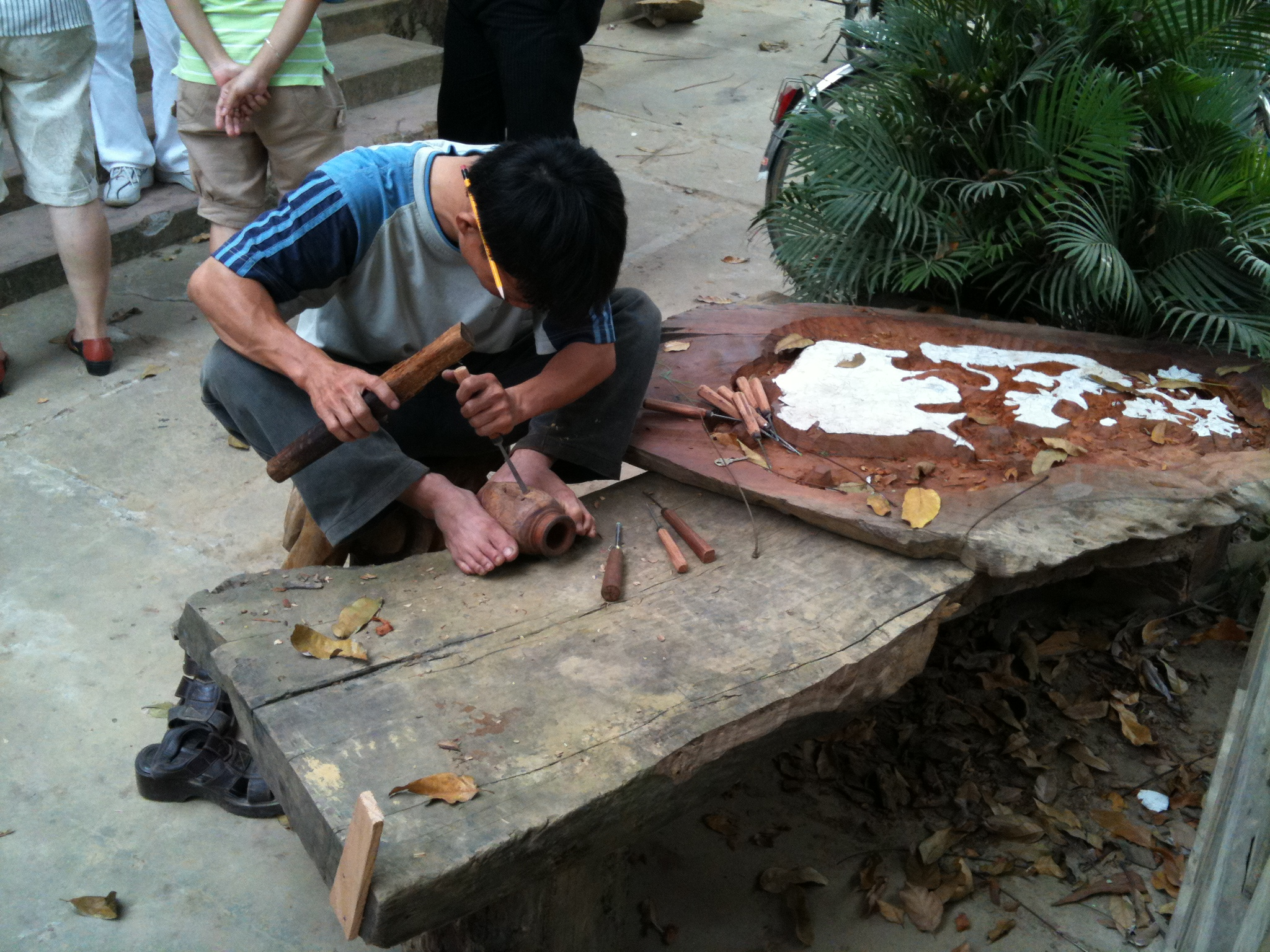
A woodcarver plies his trade at a Kim Bồng woodworking studio.

Kim Bồng woodworking village (Vietnamese: Làng mộc Kim Bồng) is a village located in Cẩm Kim commune, Hội An, Quảng Nam Province, most notable for its carpentry (including cabinet making and shipbuilding) and traditional woodworking products. Established in the 15th century, it reached its peak in the 18th century, when the village craftsmen contributed their woodworking skills to many different projects, including the imperial capital in Huế. Using their shipbuilding skills, they supplied ships and ghe bầu (large boats used for sailing) for the busy commercial port of Hội An.

To deal with a marked decline of interest in the woodworking profession during the 20th century, the village successfully offered training and other incentives to young apprentices, resulting in an increase to over 200 woodworkers and 18 different woodcarving companies as of 2008. Additionally, a successful community-based tourism project in Kim Bồng has allowed greater tourism revenue for the village; the venture's success has been suggested as a pattern for future sustainable tourism projects throughout Southeast Asia.

The village's name comes from the Vietnamese kim (yellow) and bồng (floating), supposedly after the jackfruit wood that sometimes floats on the Thu Bồn River.

== History ==
Kim Bồng was settled in the 15th century, supposedly by four soldiers from the army of Emperor Lê Lợi, who founded the Later Lê dynasty. According to traditional stories, these four soldiers were adept at woodworking, and went on to establish the village's four most notable craft families (Huynh, Nguyen, Phan, and Truong), many of whose members carry on that trade to the present day. As the neighbouring town of Hội An developed during the late 16th and early 17th centuries, Kim Bồng's carpenters and woodworkers became more widely known; in the 17th century, local carpenters were supposedly commissioned to build a warship for the Spanish navy. Craftsmen from Kim Bồng also produced most of the detail work on the buildings of the former imperial capital in Huế, and, more recently, on Vietnamese revolutionary leader Ho Chi Minh's tomb.

In the present day, Kim Bồng craftsmen are often involved in restoration projects. For example, since the old town of Hội An was designated a UNESCO World Heritage Site in 1999, many of the village's artisans have found work restoring historic buildings, some of which have remained otherwise untouched for hundreds of years. Local craftsmen have also worked on restoration projects in nearby Da Nang, and in Quảng Ninh Province.

== Economy ==
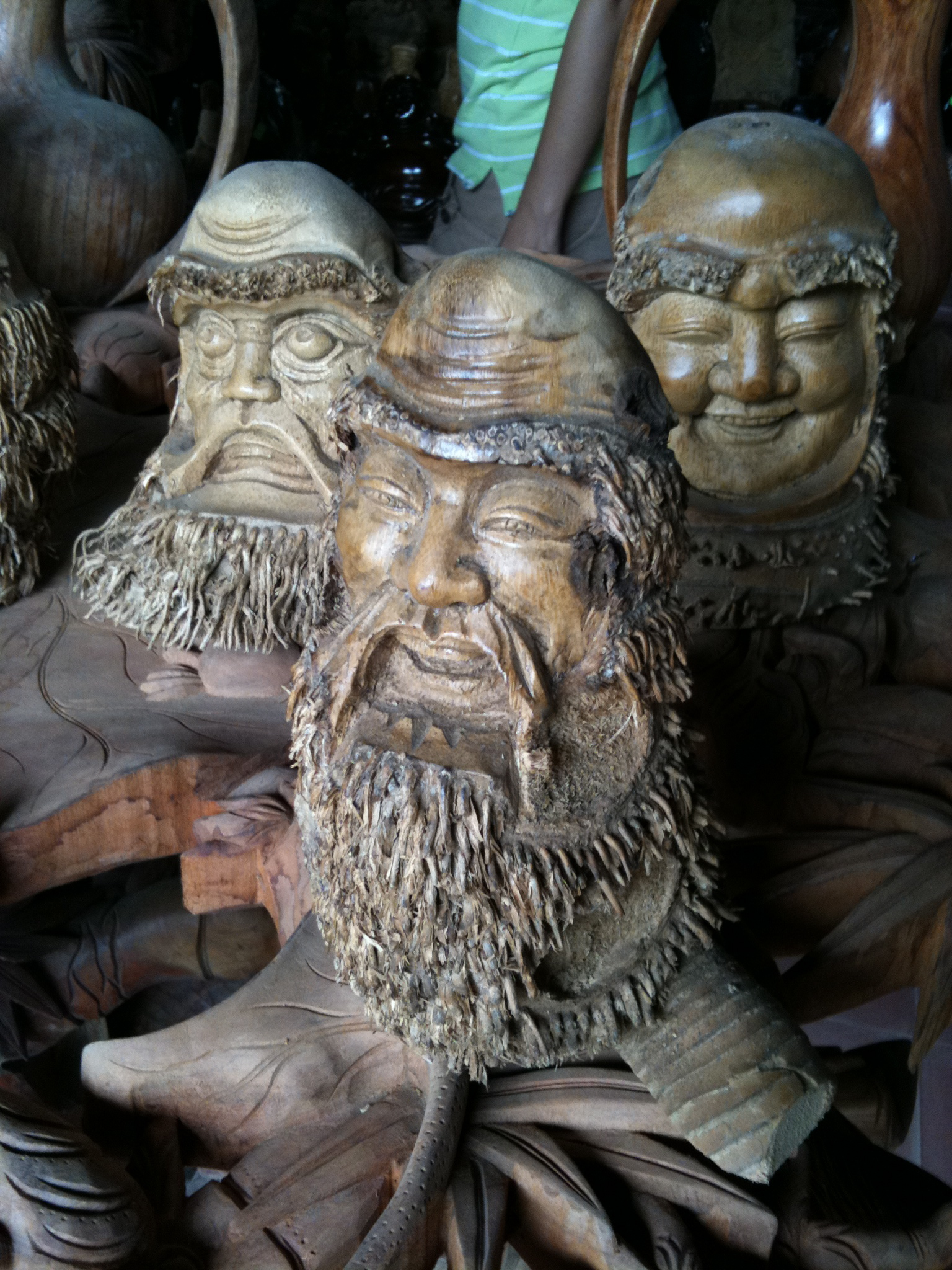
Kim Bồng wood carvings.

As its popular appellation suggests, the economy of Kim Bồng has long been dominated by carpentry (including cabinetmaking and shipbuilding) and woodworking. Kim Bồng woodwork is featured on unique columns, rafters and furniture found throughout the greater Hội An area and Quảng Nam Province; local craftsmen have also been employed in many high-profile projects in Vietnam, including detail work on the buildings of the former imperial capital in Huế, and on Vietnamese revolutionary leader Ho Chi Minh's tomb.

In more recent years, woodworking as a profession fell out of favour with young people, mainly due to poor returns: the average income of a woodworker in Kim Bồng is about VND 1.5 million (US$85) per month. By the 1990s, few master carvers remained in the village. To help promote the profession, Cẩm Kim commune created a program allowing young people to receive free training in carpentry and woodworking, along with providing a monthly stipend of VND 150,000 ($8) and tools of the trade. Training courses are provided by master carver Huynh Ri, whose family includes 12 generations of woodcarvers. Several other local woodworking studios also provide on-the-job training to apprentice woodcarvers. These training programs have resulted in an increase in skilled woodworkers: the village numbered over 200 workers and 18 different woodcarving companies as of 2008. These results were lauded by UNESCO as "keeping the traditional skills and intangible heritage of the town of Hoi An and its surrounding villages alive".

Tourism is a more recent contributor to the local economy, beginning in 2002, when the Vietnam National Administration of Tourism (VNAT) led a community-based tourism project in Kim Bồng, together with UNESCO and the United Nations Conference on Trade and Development/World Trade Organization's Export-led Poverty Reduction Programme (EPRP). The village was selected as a promising location for the project because of its proximity to Hội An (already a major tourist destination), which provided an existing tourist base, and its existing craft sector. A dual pedestrian-bicycle trail was established to lead visitors through the village to see the local woodworking shops, where they are able to observe craftsmen working and purchase their products. Concurrent with the development of infrastructure, a tourism service cooperative was established, as well as a skills training program for members and a marketing program which resulted in market linkages with several major hotels and tour operators operating in Hội An. Local and provincial tourism authorities have also incorporated the village into festivals and promotional campaigns. The success of the venture has led it to be considered a model case on which future sustainable tourism projects throughout Southeast Asia can be patterned.

== See also ==
- List of Vietnamese handicraft villages
