= Hà Đông, Hanoi =

Hà Đông Ward Phường Hà Đông Thành phố Hà Đông
- Ward (Class-II)
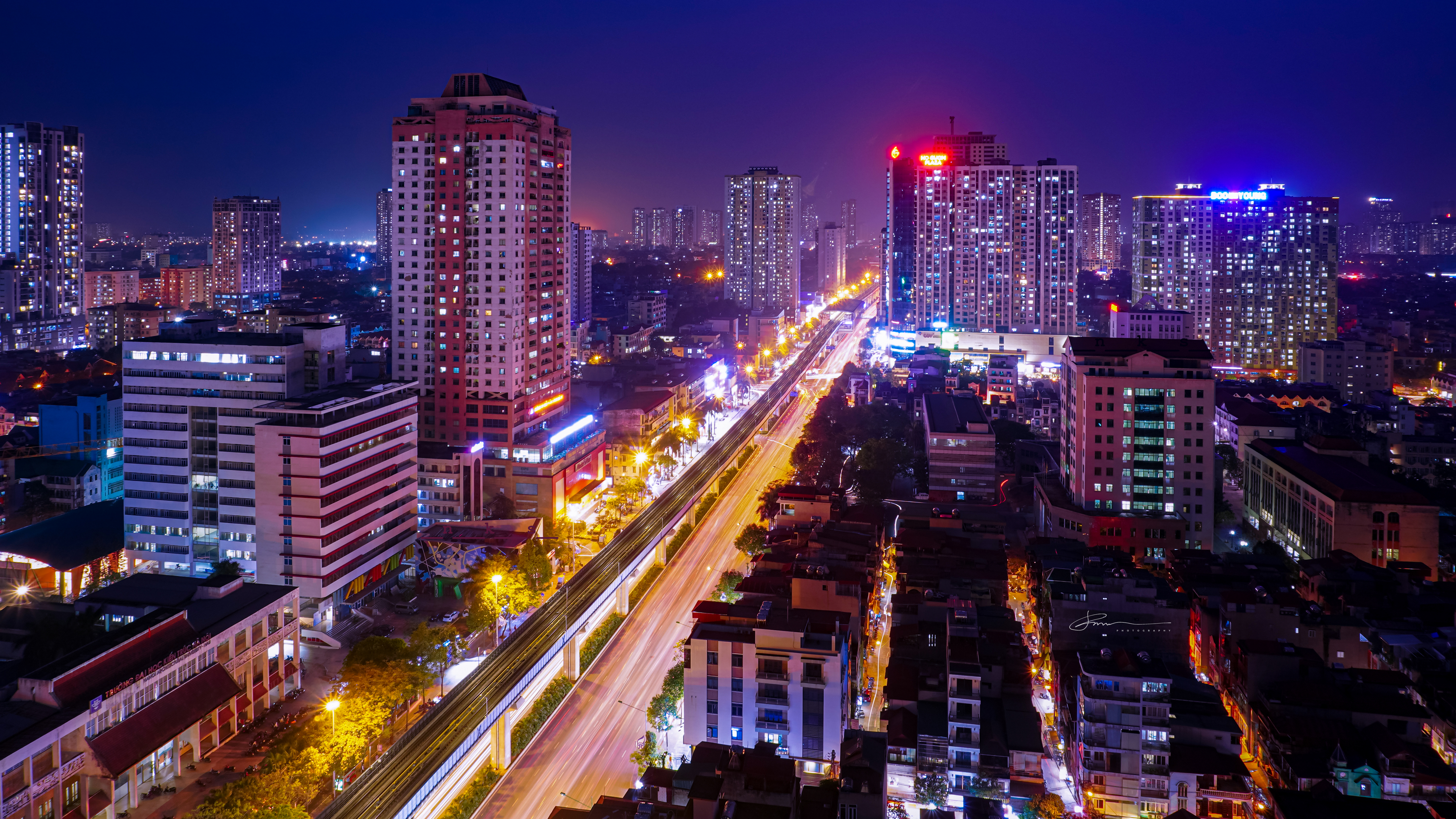
- Skyline of Hà Đông overnight.

- Seal
- Nicknames: "Silkland" (Quê Lụa) "Eastland" (Xứ Đông)
- Motto: ?
- Interactive map of Hà Đông Ward
- Location within Vietnam
- Coordinates: 20°58′N 105°46′E
- Country: Vietnam
- Region: Red River Delta
- Municipality: Hà Nội
- Establishment: December 1, 1904 (town); December 27, 2006 (city); May 8, 2009 (urban district); April 19, 2025 (ward)
- Central hall: Block N01, The New Administrative Centre, Hà Đông Ward

Government
  - Type: Ward-level authority
  - People Committee's Chairman: Cấn Thị Việt Hà
  - People Council's chairman: Nguyễn Văn Trường
  - Front Committee's chairman: Nguyễn Tiến Quyết
  - Party Committee's Secretary: Nguyễn Thanh Xuân

Area
  - Urban: 9.26 km^{2} (3.58 sq mi)

Population (2025)
  - Ward (Class-II): 90,284
  - Ethnicities: Kinh; Tanka; Others
- Time zone: UTC+7 (Indochina Time)
- ZIP code: 10000–12100 (Note: An official code from December 31, 2023, to present.)
- Area code: 24
- Climate: Cwa
- Website: Hadong.Hanoi.gov.vn; Hadong.Hanoi.dcs.vn

Hà Đông [ha̤ː˨˩:ɗəwŋ˧˧] is a ward of Hanoi, the capital city in the Red River Delta of Vietnam.

== History ==
Its name Hà Đông (河東) means "the East of the River", which refers to the Nhuệ River, that is Kẻ Noi or Nhuệ Giang in Vietnamese. Earlier French administrative documents all recorded it as Ha-dông or sometimes Hà-đông.

=== Middle Ages ===
The modern site of Hà Đông Ward dates back to the pre-20th-century period when it belonged to a semi-official administrative unit called Cầu Đa Hamlet (多橋村, xóm Cầu Đa), or colloquially known as Đơ Village (làng Đơ). This name is believed to have existed since at least the early 15th century. The remaining traces of it today are three sites called Đa Lộc, Đa Phúc and Vạn Phúc, where are old villages. These names all reflect the local traditional silk weaving craft. (Note: Vân Trai Trần Quang Đức, Ngàn năm áo mũ : Lịch sử trang phục Việt Nam giai đoạn 1009–1945, Nhà sách Nhã Nam & Nhà xuất bản Thế Giới, Hà Nội, 2013.)

Before the government of French Indochina carried out the first administrative reforms in Ton-Kin, Đơ Village was already part of Thượng Thanh Oai canton, Thanh Oai rural district, Ứng Hòa prefecture, Hà Nội province. According to the description of French geographical surveyors, this hamlet was located on the right bank of the Nhuệ River, its only feature being a tiled bridge over the river, which signified the prosperity of the locality. (Note: Cầu mái : Starting from the Revival Lê Dynasty, villages with abundant budgets were allowed to build a bridge with a roof of leaves or bricks to protect against extreme weather. That is why outsiders can guess the level of wealth of the locality just by looking at the bridge.)

The capital of Hà Nội province was transferred to Cầu Đơ Village (làng Cầu Đơ) according to a Decree signed by the provisional governor-general Augustin Juline Fourès on December 26, 1886. By May 1902, Hà Nội had been further renamed Cầu Đơ province. However, on December 1, 1904, Cầu Đơ province was renamed again as Hà Đông province, at the same time, Cầu Đơ Village was no longer the provincial capital. From then until 1945, Cầu Đơ Village remained just a suburb of Hà Đông town, which was the capital of Hà Đông province.

=== 20th century ===
Soon after the Provisional Government of the State of Vietnam took over the Northern Vietnam from the French military government of Indochina in 1948, Cầu Đơ Village was formally incorporated into Hà Đông town, but its level remained the same as Cầu Đơ Hamlet (thôn Cầu Đơ). After that, in July 1949, Cầu Đơ Hamlet merged with three other hamlets La Khê, Văn Phú and Văn La to form Văn Khê Commune (xã Văn Khê). However, in April 1955, Cầu Đơ was separated from Văn Khê to merge with Hà Trì hamlet of Kiến Hưng commune to form Hà Cầu Commune (xã Hà Cầu), belonging to Hà Đông town, according to a Decision by the Government of the Democratic Republic of Vietnam.

=== 21st century ===
On September 23, 2003, Hà Cầu became Hà Cầu Ward (phường Hà Cầu) of expanded Hà Đông town, which was later upgraded to Hà Đông City (thành phố Hà Đông), the capital of Hà Tây province, on December 27, 2006. The former Hà Tây provincial authority initiated a project to plan the entire area of Hà Cầu Ward into the New Administrative Centre area (Note: Trung-tâm Hành-chính Mới.) of the whole province, while the old center was ceded to the city-level authority.

On August 1, 2008, the government of Vietnam made a historic move, that is, merging Hà Nội city with the entire Hà Tây province and small parts of provinces Vĩnh Phúc and Hòa Bình to form the expanded Hanoi capital city. On May 8, 2009, the Central Government continued to issue a Resolution to merge Hà Đông City into the urban area of Hanoi as Hà Đông Urban District (quận Hà Đông), because there was no law on the specific appatus of a city within an other city (Note: Thành phố trực thuộc thành phố.) yet in Vietnam at this time. The district covered a total area of 49.64 square kilometres (19.17 sq mi), what was subdivided 17 wards, including : Biên Giang, Dương Nội, Đồng Mai, Hà Cầu, Kiến Hưng, Mộ Lao, Nguyễn Trãi, Phú La, Phú Lãm, Phú Lương, Phúc La, Quang Trung, Trần Phú, Vạn Phúc, Văn Quán, Yên Nghĩa, Yết Kiêu. As of 2019, there were 397,854 people residing in the district, the third highest of all districts in Hanoi, after Hoàng Mai. The district bordered Thanh Trì, Thanh Xuân, Nam Từ Liêm, Hoài Đức, Quốc Oai, Chương Mỹ, Thanh Oai. By January 1, 2025, two wards Nguyễn Trãi and Yết Kiêu will be merged into Quang Trung ward.

Immediately after the Lunar New Year 2025, the Government of Vietnam has been actively implementing the Plan to Arrange and Merge Administrative Units at all levels of the central and local authorities. The Hà Nội City People's Committee has directed the Hà Đông Urban-District People's Committee to organize the Conference on the Re-arrangement of Commune+Ward-level Administrative Units (Note: Hội nghị liên tịch về sắp xếp đơn vị hành chính cấp xã–phường.) after consulting with the people, whom were required to have permanent residence in the district. The conference held on April 19, 2025, reached consensus on two important Resolutions :

- Hà Đông Urban District has been officially dissolved as an administrative unit along with its related agencies.
- In the area of former district, 5 new wards were formed based on the merger of 15 old wards, including Dương Nội, Hà Đông, Kiến Hưng, Phú Lương, Yên Nghĩa.

According to that Decision, Hà Đông Ward (phường Hà Đông) is in fact a restoration of the administrative and geographical features of former Cầu Đơ Village. Specifically, it includes : The entire area and population of two wards Phúc La and Vạn Phúc; big parts of five wards La Khê, Hà Cầu, Mộ Lao, Quang Trung, Văn Quán; small ones of three wards Đại Mỗ (Hà Đông urban district), Trung Văn (Nam Từ Liêm urban district), Tân Triều (Thanh Trì rural district). This new administrative unit is part of the policy of inheriting and promoting the cultural and historical values of former Cầu Đơ Village and even Hà Đông Town.

== Geography ==
=== Topography ===
Hà Đông Ward covers an area of 9,26 km^{2} (with 3,58 sq mi), which is located on the most important North–South axis of the Hanoi Capital Area.

=== Demography ===
According to statistics of the Hà Đông Ward People's Committee in 2025, its total population reached 90,284, not counting those who did not declare permanent residence.

=== Climate ===
Climate data for Hà Đông Ward
Month	Jan	Feb	Mar	Apr	May	Jun	Jul	Aug	Sep	Oct	Nov	Dec	Year
Record high °C (°F)	32.4 (90.3)	34.9 (94.8)	38.9 (102.0)	39.9 (103.8)	41.3 (106.3)	42.5 (108.5)	40.0 (104.0)	39.6 (103.3)	37.5 (99.5)	35.5 (95.9)	35.0 (95.0)	30.7 (87.3)	42.5 (108.5)
Mean daily maximum °C (°F)	19.9 (67.8)	20.8 (69.4)	23.3 (73.9)	27.5 (81.5)	31.5 (88.7)	33.4 (92.1)	33.2 (91.8)	32.4 (90.3)	31.3 (88.3)	29.2 (84.6)	25.8 (78.4)	22.1 (71.8)	27.5 (81.5)
Daily mean °C (°F)	16.5 (61.7)	17.8 (64.0)	20.3 (68.5)	24.0 (75.2)	27.1 (80.8)	29.0 (84.2)	29.1 (84.4)	28.4 (83.1)	27.2 (81.0)	24.9 (76.8)	21.6 (70.9)	18.0 (64.4)	23.7 (74.7)
Mean daily minimum °C (°F)	14.3 (57.7)	15.8 (60.4)	18.4 (65.1)	21.7 (71.1)	24.3 (75.7)	26.0 (78.8)	26.3 (79.3)	25.8 (78.4)	24.6 (76.3)	22.7 (72.9)	18.7 (65.7)	15.3 (59.5)	21.1 (70.0)
Record low °C (°F)	5.4 (41.7)	6.1 (43.0)	7.3 (45.1)	13.3 (55.9)	16.5 (61.7)	20.4 (68.7)	22.5 (72.5)	21.9 (71.4)	19.0 (66.2)	12.0 (53.6)	8.4 (47.1)	3.6 (38.5)	3.6 (38.5)
Average rainfall mm (inches)	28.2 (1.11)	26.5 (1.04)	45.0 (1.77)	83.1 (3.27)	189.4 (7.46)	232.5 (9.15)	254.6 (10.02)	293.5 (11.56)	228.8 (9.01)	184.8 (7.28)	87.4 (3.44)	36.9 (1.45)	1,687.6 (66.44)
Average rainy days	9.6	11.7	15.2	13.6	14.5	14.4	15.6	16.3	13.7	10.8	7.6	6.2	149.8
Average relative humidity (%)	83.3	85.3	86.8	88.1	85.5	82.5	82.5	85.7	86.1	82.9	81.2	80.2	84.2
Mean monthly sunshine hours	65.7	49.7	50.1	87.8	170.2	167.1	181.9	167.0	162.4	146.1	133.2	110.3	1,477.8
Source: Vietnam Institute for Building Science and Technology

== Culture ==
Hà Đông has a signifianct number of monuments, landmarks, relics, traditional festivals and craft villages. It is an important transport hub and is also home to various government offices and universities.

Hà Đông is also known as the birthplace of video game Flappy Bird. Its author Nguyễn Hà Đông is from Vạn Phúc Village.

== See also ==
- Dương Nội
- Đại Mỗ
- Hoàng Mai
- Kiến Hưng
- Lĩnh Nam
- Phú Lương
- Thanh Xuân
- Yên Hòa
- Yên Nghĩa
