= Thổ Hà =

Coordinates: 21°12′N 106°02′E

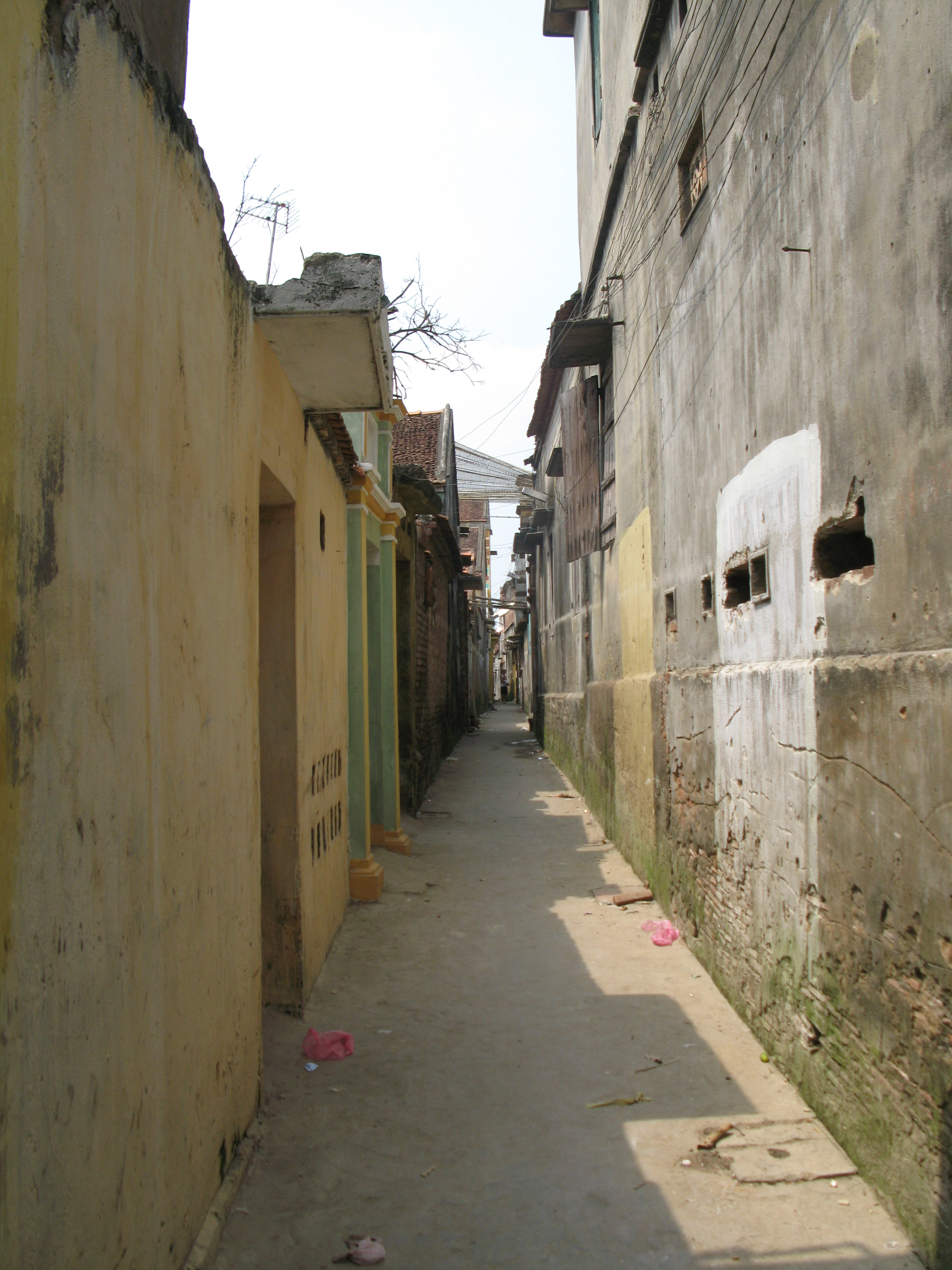

Thổ Hà is a village in Việt Yên, Bắc Giang Province, northeastern Vietnam.
