= Quy Nhơn (city) =

Former provincial city in the former Bình Định province, Vietnam

Quy Nhon Quy Nhơn
- Provincial city (Class-1)
- Quy Nhon City; Thành phố Quy Nhơn
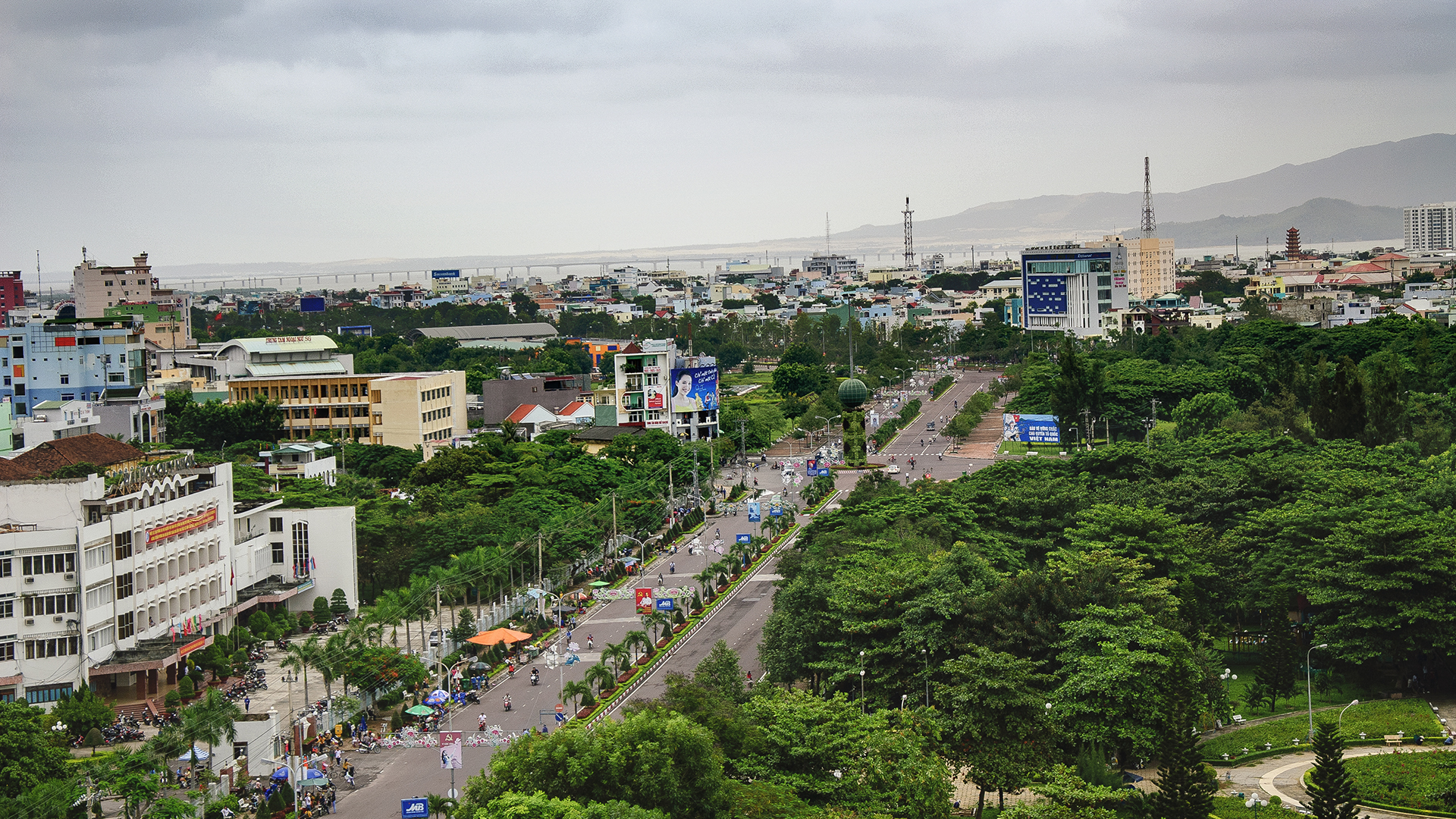
- Quy Nhon
- Interactive map of Quy Nhon
- Location of in Vietnam
- Coordinates: 13°46′N 109°14′E
- Country: Vietnam
- Province: Bình Định
- Established city: 1986

Area
  - Total: 286 km^{2} (110 sq mi)

Population (2024)
  - Total: 578,600
  - Density: 2.023/km^{2} (5.24/sq mi)
- Time zone: UTC+7 (Indochina Time)
- Postal code: 55100–55199
- Area codes: 256
- License plate: 55
- Climate: As
- Website: www.quynhon.gov.vn

Quy Nhơn is a former provincial city and capital of the former Bình Định province, Vietnam. The current area of Quy Nhơn provincial city includes Quy Nhơn, Quy Nhơn Bắc, Quy Nhơn Đông, Quy Nhơn Nam and Quy Nhơn Tây wards of Gia Lai province. Quy Nhơn ward is the administrative center of Gia Lai province.

== Geography ==
=== Geographical location ===
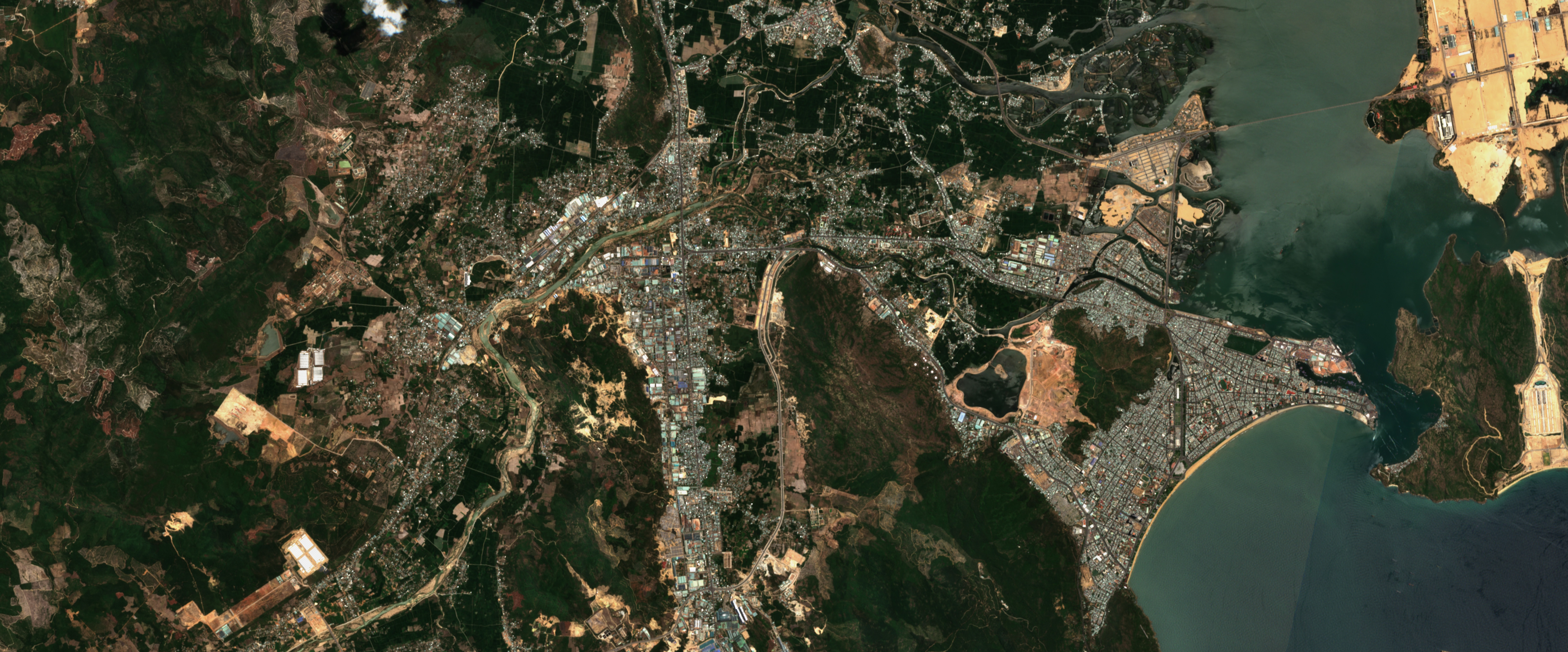
Quy Nhơn as seen from satellite imagery

Quy Nhơn is a provincial city located in the southeastern part of Bình Định province. It was the southern gateway of the former Bình Định province. Its geographical location is as follows:

- To the east, it borders the East Sea.
- To the west, it borders Tuy Phước and Vân Canh districts.
- To the north, it borders Tuy Phước and Phù Cát districts.
- To the south, it borders Phú Yên province.

Quy Nhơn is located between 13°36'N and 13°54'N, and between 109°06'E and 109°22'E, 1065km south of Hanoi, 650km south of Ho Chi Minh City, 323km south of Da Nang and 165km southeast of Pleiku.
