= Chợ Thủ =

Coordinates: 10°32′10″N 105°28′8″E

An Giang
- Rural commune and village
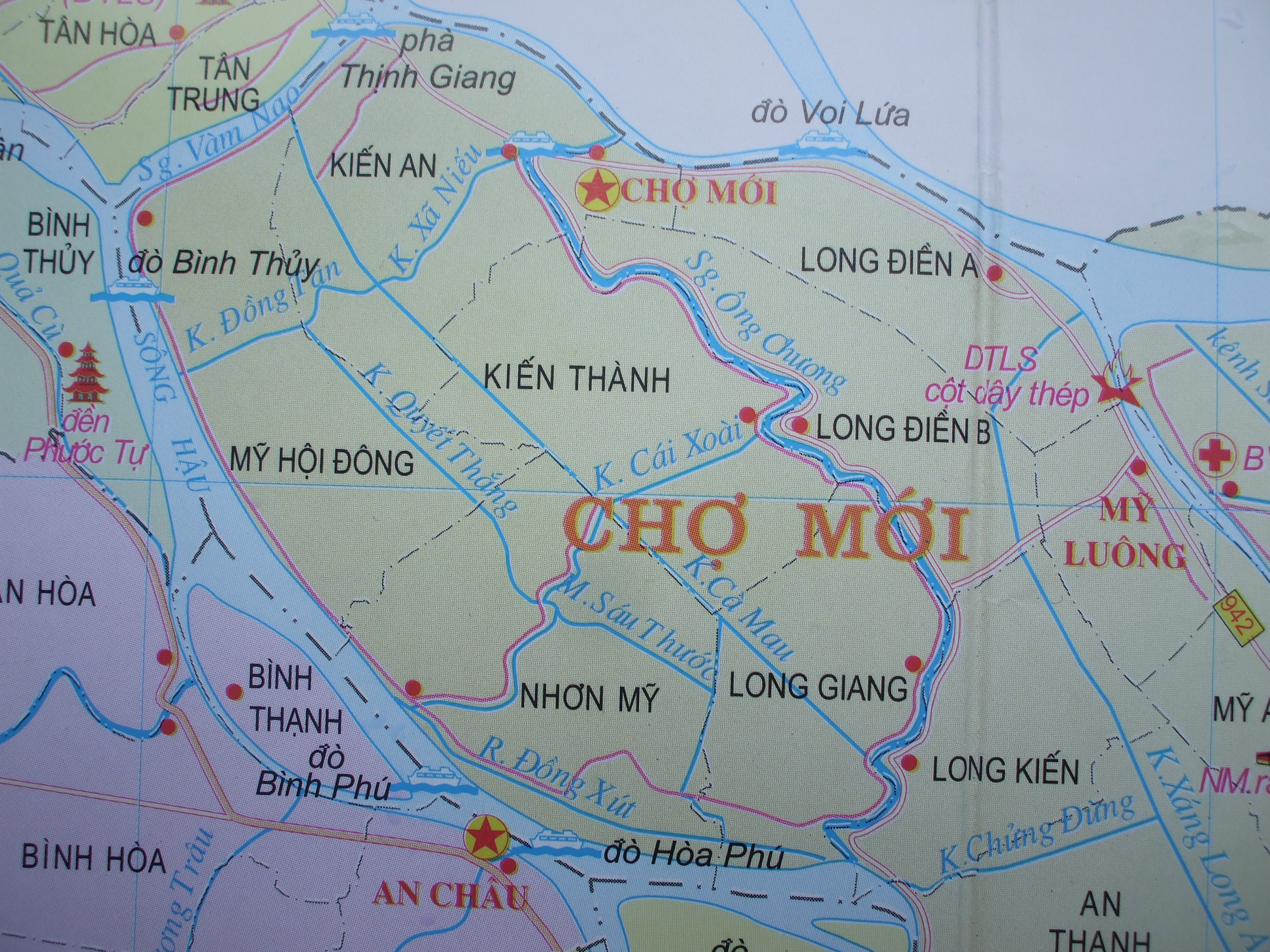
- Interactive map of An Giang
- Country: Vietnam
- Province: An Giang
- District: Chợ Mới
- Time zone: UTC+07:00 (Indochina Time)

Chợ Thủ is a village in Chợ Mới District, An Giang, Vietnam.

Chợ Thủ is located in Long Điền A, Chợ Mới district, An Giang Province, on the road from town to town Mỹ Luông, Chợ Mới. This is a place with long history, is formed in the process of clearing wasteland of Nguyễn Hữu Cảnh. It is also one of the cradles of Hòa Hảo Buddhism.

== Life ==
Here the river eroded foot-years (the most powerful erosion on rivers Tiền) - Image viewer - , the people living in extremely difficult due to similar river bank erosion is The old market area has changed the lifestyle and activities as well as people. low intellectual level because students often must leave school early to assist parents living. See and , 75% of people under the direction of assimilation, the main trades: carpenters - glass makers - makers of aluminum - is a farmer. Young expatriates earn 70%, full moon in June and Lunar New Year go home
