= Vạn Phúc, Hà Đông =

Village in Hà Đông

Coordinates: 20.980°N 105.773°E

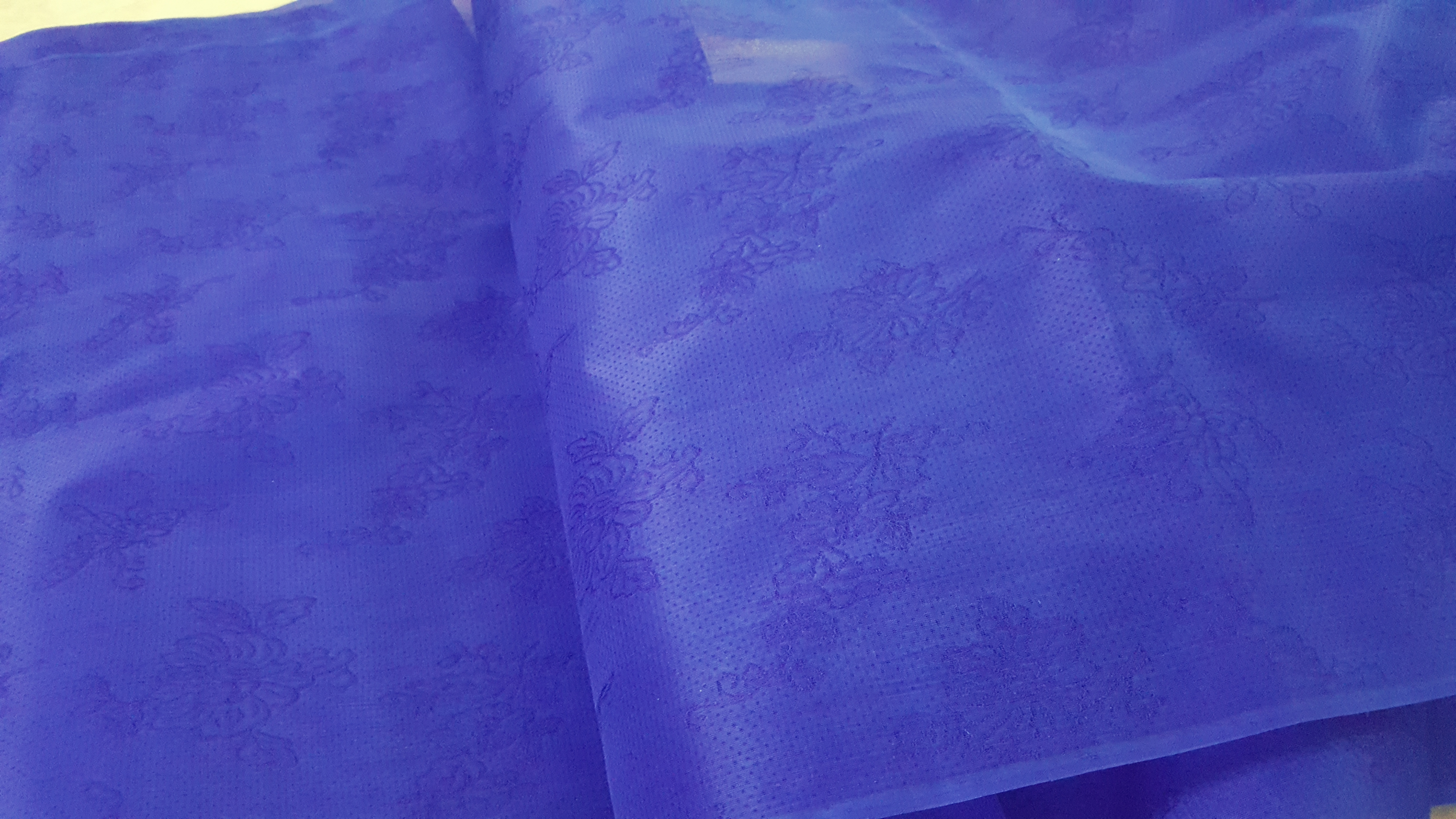
Vạn Phúc gauze

Vạn Phúc is a ward of Hà Đông district in Hanoi, Vietnam. It is renowned for its traditional silk weaving village, one of the oldest in the country, with a history spanning over 1,000 years. As of 2025, following administrative rearrangements, Vạn Phúc has been merged into the new ward of Hà Đông.

== History ==
It is one of the most prominent silk-producing villages in Vietnam and among the most frequented handicraft villages near Hanoi, which contains over 90 officially designated handicraft villages.

== Geography ==
Vạn Phúc is located approximately 10 km southwest of central Hanoi, along the Nhuệ River. It borders wards such as Đại Mỗ to the north, Yết Kiêu to the south, Mộ Lao to the east, and La Khê and Quang Trung to the west.

== Culture ==
=== Tourism ===
Vạn Phúc hosts annual events like the "Vạn Phúc - Sắc Lụa Nghìn Năm" cultural and tourism week, featuring umbrella-decorated streets and handicraft demonstrations. The village temple, built in the 17th century, and traditional landmarks like the ancient banyan tree and well preserve its cultural heritage. Tourists can observe silk-making processes, purchase products, and participate in activities like silk painting. It attracts both domestic and international visitors.

== Notable people ==
- Nguyễn Hà Đông (born 1985), developer of Flappy Bird.
