= Thiệu Hóa district =

Coordinates: 19.917°N 105.667°E

Thiệu Hóa district Huyện Thiệu Hóa
- District
- Interactive map of Thiệu Hóa district
- Country: Vietnam
- Region: North Central Coast
- Province: Thanh Hóa
- Capital: Vạn Hà

Area
  - Total: 68 sq mi (175 km^{2})

Population (2003)
  - Total: 190,383
- Time zone: UTC+7 (UTC + 7)

Thieu Hoa is a district (huyện) of Thanh Hóa province in the North Central Coast region of Vietnam.

As of 2003 the district had a population of 190,383. The district covers an area of 175 km^{2} (68 sq mi). The district capital lies at Vạn Hà.
