= An Nhơn, Gia Lai =

An Nhơn
- Ward
- Location in Vietnam
- Coordinates: 13°55′13″N 109°05′29″E
- Country: Vietnam
- Region: South Central Coast
- Province: Gia Lai
- Established as town: 26 December 1997
- Established as ward: 28 November 2011

Area
  - Total: 5.07 km^{2} (1.96 sq mi)

Population (2011)
  - Total: 16,785
  - Density: 3,310/km^{2} (8,600/sq mi)
- Time zone: UTC+07:00 (ICT)
- Administrative code: 21910

An Nhơn was a ward (phường) in Gia Lai Province, in the South Central Coast region of Vietnam. It is situated in the northern part of An Nhơn town and covers an area of 5.07 km^{2} with a population of 16,785 as of 2011, resulting in a density of 3,310 people per km^{2}.

== Geography ==
Đập Đá is located in Bình Định's main lowland plain in the south of the province. The Đập Đá River, part of the Côn River delta, flows through the ward. National Route 1, Vietnam's primary north–south highway, passes through the ward. It is also approximately 7 km north of National Route 19, which connects to the port city of Quy Nhơn (23 km southeast) and the Central Highlands to the west. Phù Cát Airport is located about 10 km to the north.

== History ==
Prior to 1997, Đập Đá was a commune in An Nhơn district. On 26 December 1997, the Vietnamese Government issued Decree 118/1997/NĐ-CP, establishing Đập Đá as a town with an area of 498 hectares and a population of 18,800. On 28 November 2011, Resolution 101/NQ-CP converted An Nhơn district into An Nhơn town and upgraded Đập Đá town to a ward with an area of 507.13 hectares and a population of 16,785.

The area shares a location with the former capital of the Champa kingdom, known as Vijaya. The ruins of the citadel, also known as Thành Đồ Bàn, are approximately 3 km from the ward center. Vijaya served as the capital of Champa until its defeat by Vietnamese forces in 1471. In 1992, two stone lion statues dating to the late 11th to early 12th century were discovered in the Bả Canh area of Đập Đá, near the Cánh Tiên Tower within the Thành Đồ Bàn complex. These artifacts, recognized as national treasures, exhibit a blend of Trà Kiệu and local Champa artistic styles.

During the Vietnam War, on 22 December 1968 (lunar calendar), the 6th Battalion engaged enemy forces in Đập Đá while liberating Quy Nhơn, resulting in 153 casualties. A memorial site commemorates these soldiers.

== Administration ==
Đập Đá is divided into seven administrative areas: Mỹ Hòa, Nam Phương Danh, Bắc Phương Danh, Tây Phương Danh, Đông Phương Danh, Bả Canh, and Bằng Châu.

In 2025, as part of administrative rearrangements in Bình Định Province, Đập Đá was merged with Nhơn Mỹ commune and Nhơn Thành ward to form the new An Nhơn ward, with its headquarters located at the former Đập Đá ward office. This change is part of broader efforts to upgrade An Nhơn town to city status.

== Economy and Infrastructure ==
The ward features traditional crafts, such as the Tây Phương Danh forging village. A display house for its products was built in 2023 but has faced operational challenges. An Nhơn town, including Đập Đá, is targeted for urban development, with investments exceeding 3,300 billion VND for infrastructure and economic growth to achieve city status by 2025.

== Additional sources ==
- Vietnam Road Atlas (Tập Bản đồ Giao thông Đường bộ Việt Nam). Cartographic Publishing House (Vietnam), 2004
