= List of VietJet Air destinations =

VietJet Air flies to 19 domestic destinations and 42 scheduled international destinations from its operating bases in Tan Son Nhat International Airport in Ho Chi Minh City and Noi Bai International Airport in Hanoi. It also serves some additional international points as seasonal charters.

== List ==
Country/territory	City	Airport	Notes	Ref.
Australia	Adelaide	Adelaide Airport	Terminated	
Australia	Brisbane	Brisbane Airport		
Australia	Melbourne	Melbourne Airport		
Australia	Perth	Perth Airport		
Australia	Sydney	Sydney Airport		
Australia	Sydney	Western Sydney Airport	Begins 10 January 2027	
Cambodia	Siem Reap	Siem Reap–Angkor International Airport		
China	Beijing	Beijing Daxing International Airport		
China	Chengdu	Chengdu Shuangliu International Airport	Terminated	
China	Chengdu	Chengdu Tianfu International Airport		
China	Guangzhou	Guangzhou Baiyun International Airport		
China	Haikou	Haikou Meilan International Airport	Terminated	
China	Hangzhou	Hangzhou Xiaoshan International Airport		
China	Kunming	Kunming Changshui International Airport	Terminated	
China	Nanchang	Nanchang Changbei International Airport	Terminated	
China	Ningbo	Ningbo Lishe International Airport	Charter	
China	Shanghai	Shanghai Pudong International Airport		
China	Tianjin	Tianjin Binhai International Airport		
China	Xi'an	Xi'an Xianyang International Airport		
Hong Kong	Hong Kong	Hong Kong International Airport		
Czech Republic	Prague	Václav Havel Airport Prague		
India	Ahmedabad	Ahmedabad Airport		
India	Bangalore	Kempegowda International Airport		
India	Delhi	Indira Gandhi International Airport		
India	Hyderabad	Rajiv Gandhi International Airport		
India	Kochi	Cochin International Airport	Terminated	
India	Mumbai	Chhatrapati Shivaji Maharaj International Airport		
India	Tiruchirappalli	Tiruchirappalli International Airport	Terminated	
Indonesia	Denpasar	Ngurah Rai International Airport		
Indonesia	Jakarta	Soekarno–Hatta International Airport		
Japan	Fukuoka	Fukuoka Airport		
Japan	Hiroshima	Hiroshima Airport		
Japan	Ibaraki	Ibaraki Airport	Charter	
Japan	Kagoshima	Kagoshima Airport	Terminated	
Japan	Osaka	Kansai International Airport		
Japan	Nagoya	Chubu Centrair International Airport		
Japan	Shizuoka	Shizuoka Airport		
Japan	Tokyo	Haneda Airport		
Japan	Tokyo	Narita International Airport		
Kazakhstan	Almaty	Almaty International Airport	Seasonal	
Kazakhstan	Astana	Nursultan Nazarbayev International Airport	Seasonal	
Macau	Macau	Macau International Airport	Terminated	
Malaysia	Kuala Lumpur	Kuala Lumpur International Airport		
Maldives	Malé	Velana International Airport	Begins 5 December 2026	
Mongolian	Ulaanbaatar	Chinggis Khaan International Airport		
Myanmar	Yangon	Yangon International Airport	Terminated	
Philippines	Cebu	Mactan Cebu International Airport	Begins 11 December 2026	
Philippines	Clark	Clark International Airport	Begins 10 November 2026	
Philippines	Manila	Ninoy Aquino International Airport		
Russia	Kazan	Ğabdulla Tuqay Kazan International Airport	Seasonal charter	
Russia	Khabarovsk	Khabarovsk Novy Airport	Seasonal charter	
Russia	Krasnoyarsk	Krasnoyarsk International Airport	Seasonal charter	
Russia	Moscow	Sheremetyevo International Airport	Seasonal charter	
Russia	Novokuznetsk	Spichenkovo Airport	Seasonal charter	
Russia	Novosibirsk	Tolmachevo Airport	Seasonal charter	
Russia	Ufa	Mostay Kərim Ufa International Airport	Seasonal charter	
Russia	Vladivostok	Vladivostok International Airport	Seasonal charter	
Russia	Yekaterinburg	Koltsovo Airport	Begins 26 October 2026	
Singapore	Changi	Changi Airport		
Sri Lanka	Colombo	Bandaranaike International Airport		
South Korea	Busan	Gimhae International Airport		
South Korea	Daegu	Daegu International Airport		
South Korea	Muan	Muan International Airport		
South Korea	Seoul	Incheon International Airport		
South Korea	Yangyang	Yangyang International Airport	Charter	
Taiwan	Kaohsiung	Kaohsiung International Airport		
Taiwan	Taichung	Taichung International Airport		
Taiwan	Taipei	Taoyuan International Airport		
Taiwan	Tainan	Tainan Airport	Terminated	
Thailand	Bangkok	Suvarnabhumi Airport		
Thailand	Chiang Mai	Chiang Mai International Airport	Terminated	
Thailand	Phuket	Phuket International Airport		
Turkey	Istanbul	Istanbul Airport		
Vietnam	Buôn Ma Thuột	Buôn Ma Thuột Airport		
Vietnam	Cần Thơ	Cần Thơ International Airport		
Vietnam	Chu Lai	Chu Lai International Airport		
Vietnam	Côn Đảo	Con Dao Airport		
Vietnam	Đà Lạt	Lien Khuong Airport		
Vietnam	Da Nang	Da Nang International Airport	Hub	
Vietnam	Điện Biên Phủ	Dien Bien Airport	Terminated	
Vietnam	Đồng Hới	Dong Hoi Airport		
Vietnam	Hanoi	Noi Bai International Airport	Hub	
Vietnam	Hai Phong	Cat Bi International Airport		
Vietnam	Ha Long	Van Don International Airport		
Vietnam	Ho Chi Minh City	Tan Son Nhat International Airport	Hub	
Vietnam	Huế	Phu Bai International Airport		
Vietnam	Nha Trang	Cam Ranh International Airport		
Vietnam	Phú Quốc	Phu Quoc International Airport		
Vietnam	Pleiku	Pleiku Airport		
Vietnam	Qui Nhơn	Phu Cat Airport		
Vietnam	Thanh Hóa	Tho Xuan Airport		
Vietnam	Tuy Hòa	Dong Tac Airport		
Vietnam	Vinh	Vinh Airport		
