= Air Vietnam =

South Vietnamese airline (1951–1975)

Air Vietnam Hãng Hàng không Việt Nam
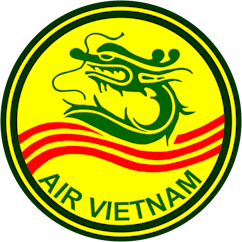

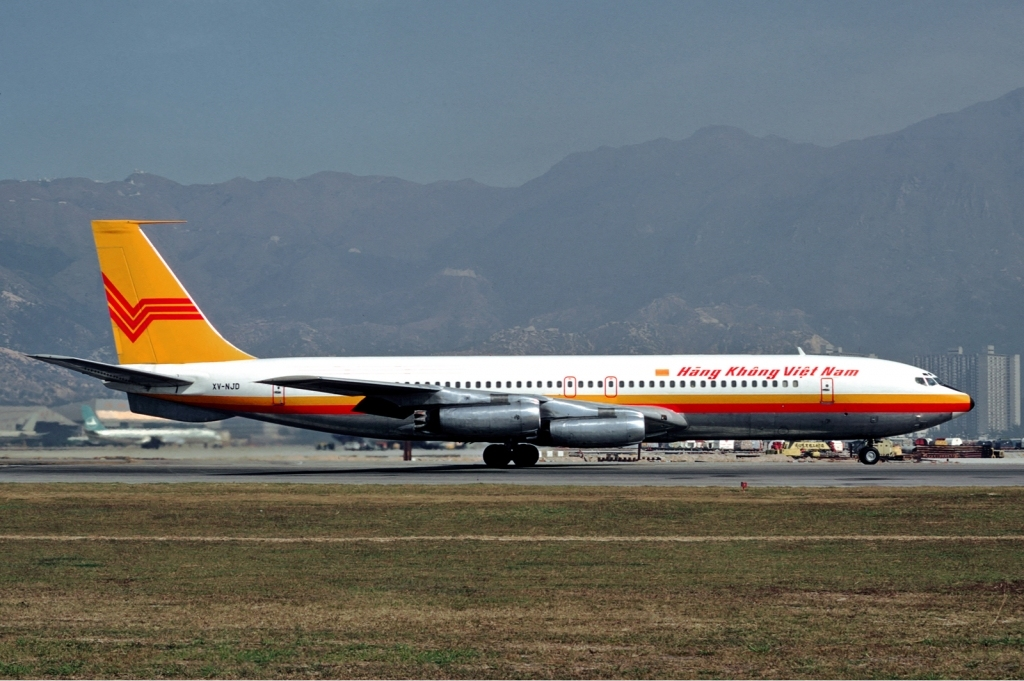
IATA	ICAO	Call sign
VN	AVN	AIR VIETNAM
- Founded: 8 June 1951
- Ceased operations: 30 April 1975
- Hubs: Tan Son Nhat International Airport, Saigon
- Secondary hubs: Da Nang International Airport
- Fleet size: 15
- Destinations: 20
- Parent company: Government of the State of Vietnam (1951–1955); Government of the Republic of Vietnam (1955–1975)
- Headquarters: Saigon; South Vietnam

Active from 1951 to 1975, Air Vietnam (Vietnamese: Hãng Hàng không Việt Nam) was Vietnam's first commercial air carrier, headquartered in District 1, Saigon. Established under a decree by Chief of State Bảo Đại, the airline operated as a state company of the State of Vietnam and later the Republic of Vietnam (South Vietnam). It flew over two million passengers, throughout the Vietnam War, and until its collapse due to the Fall of Saigon.

== History ==
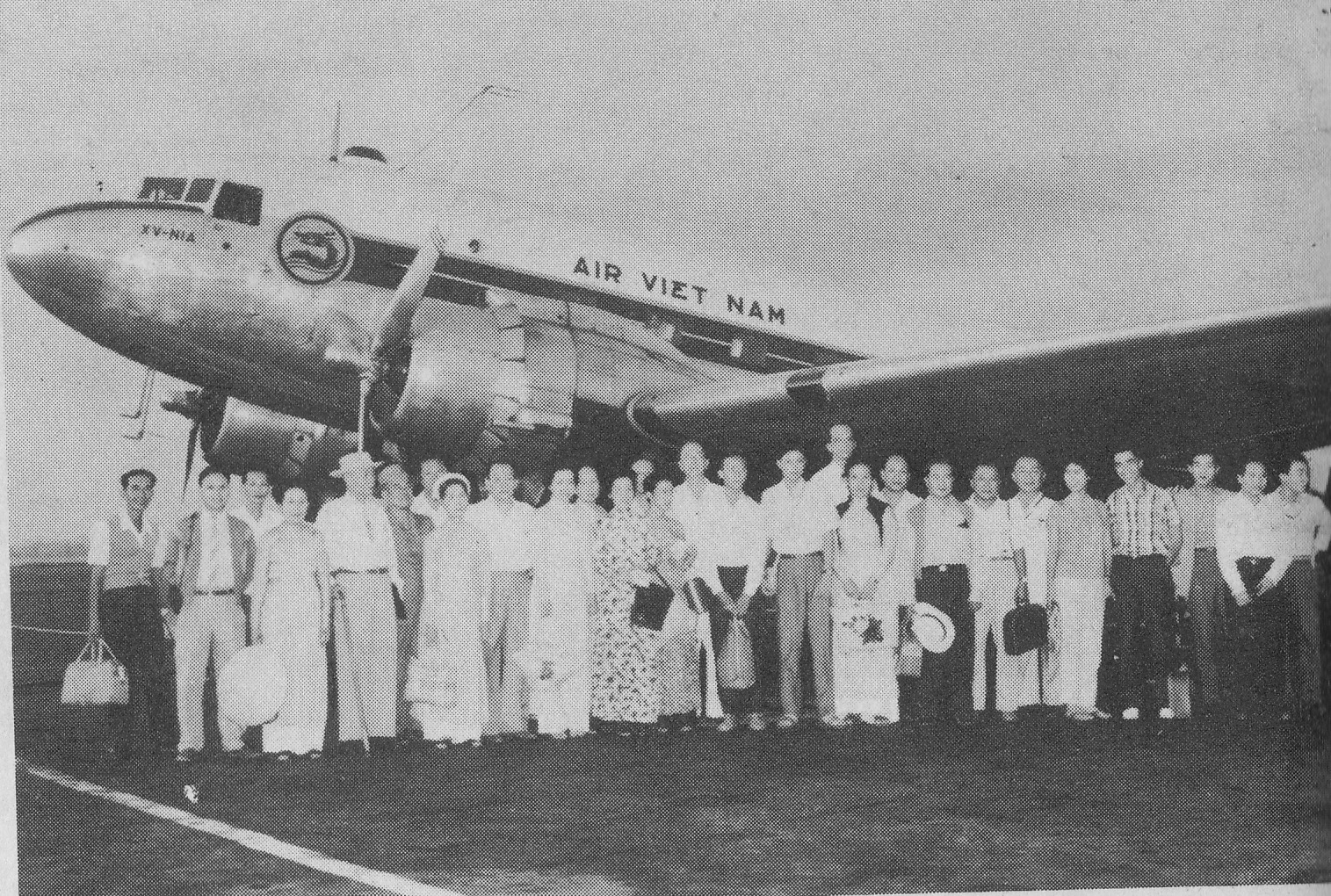
Air Viet Nam plane and passengers, 1961

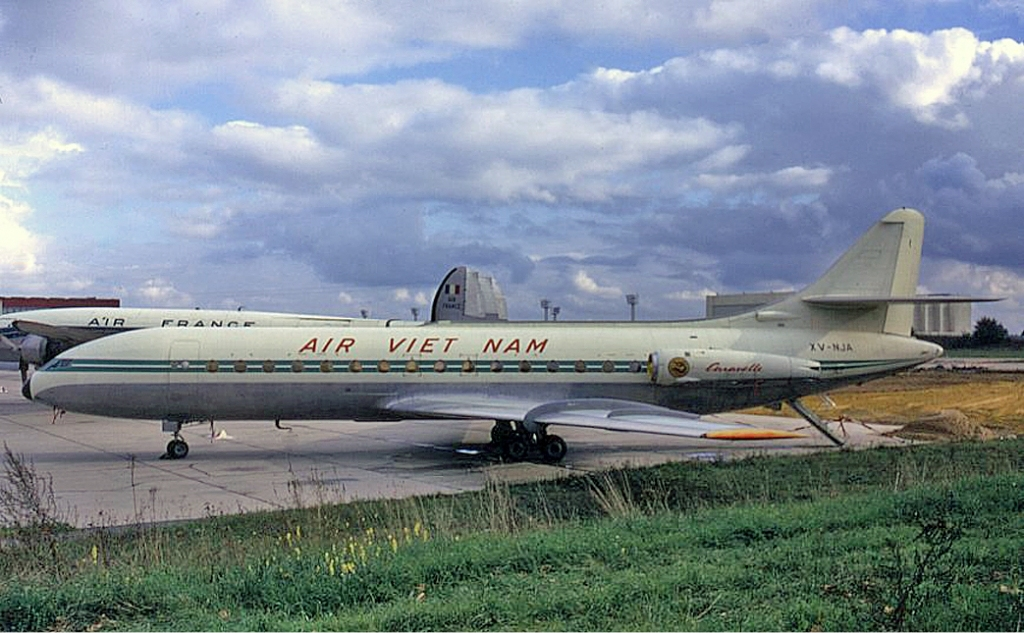
Caravelle in 1962

Founded on June 8, 1951, Air Viet Nam was the civil airline of the State of Vietnam. It had a capital of 18 million French Indochinese piastre (equivalent to 306 million French francs at that time). The Government of the State of Vietnam contributed 50%; the rest was contributed by Air France (33.5%), Indochina Air Transport (SITA) (11%), Messageries Maritimes (4.5%), Union aéronautique des transports (Union aéronautique des transports) (0.5%), and Aigle Azur Indochine (0.5%). October 15 was the inauguration day of Air Viet Nam. Following the partition of Vietnam, the State of Vietnam (South Vietnam) joined the International Civil Aviation Organization on 18 November 1954. Its Air Vietnam was therefore required to comply with the organization's regulations.

During the Republic of Vietnam era in the 1960s, Air Viet Nam began using Douglas DC-3 aircraft for domestic and international flights. In 1964, it was reinforced with French Sud Aviation Caravelle jets. Because of the war, domestic civilian passenger flights could not fly at night and had to fly during the day for security reasons. Air Viet Nam had flights to Phnom Penh, Bangkok, Singapore, Hong Kong and Vientiane. In 1965, it opened flights to Kuala Lumpur; in 1966, Taipei; in 1968, Manila, Osaka and Tokyo.

By 1968, the Republic of Vietnam (South Vietnam) government contributed 75% of the capital to Air Viet Nam while Air France reduced its share to 25%.

As passenger traffic increased with the start of the Vietnam War, Air Viet Nam added aircraft, initially Vickers Viscounts, DC-3s, and Douglas DC-4s. It eventually obtained more modern aircraft, including Boeing 727s, some of which were obtained from Air France and Pan Am. At least one C-46 Commando was leased from China Airlines, and was flown by a Taiwanese crew. That aircraft had a color scheme different from the rest of the Air Viet Nam fleet.

In an unusual joint venture, Air Viet Nam was joined by Continental Air Services (CASI), a subsidiary airline of Continental Airlines set up to provide operations and airlift support in Southeast Asia, in the mid-1960s. Under this agreement, CASI would share passengers and cargo routes with Air Viet Nam on certain domestic and international routes. In addition, CASI and Air Viet Nam would share hangars and flight lines. CASI also picked up a portion of aircraft maintenance. Heavy engine overhaul was done in Hong Kong, by China Airlines, and some in Taiwan by Air Asia (a subsidiary of Air America). CASI paid a portion of its revenues to Air Viet Nam for the routes and privileges. Many CASI aircraft operating from Saigon carried the dragon emblem of Air Viet Nam.

In 1972, Air Vietnam had one B747-200 leased from Air France and another B747-100 leased from Pan Am both of which were flown back to their owners within a few weeks of the Fall of Saigon.

Air Viet Nam's initial fleet consisted of five Cessna 170s, Douglas DC-3s and Douglas DC-4s with the airline flying mainly between cities and towns throughout Vietnam, used primarily to fly to large and small towns across Vietnam, including Hanoi, Hai Phong, Dong Hoi, Huế, Da Nang, Quy Nhon, Nha Trang and Ban Me Thuot. By 1975, Air Viet Nam was using a fleet of Boeing aircraft, some leased from Pan Am and China Airlines consisting of a number of Boeing 707s and Boeing 727s on both regional and international routes.

As passenger traffic increased during the Vietnam War, Air Vietnam added a number of aircraft, initially Viscounts, Douglas DC-3s and Douglas DC-4. From early 1962, Air Vietnam operated two Cessna 185 Skywagons and two Cessna 310.

In 1967, Air Viet Nam chose to buy two Boeing 727s from Pan American World Airways to transport international passengers for 1.440 billion VND (equivalent to 13.053 million USD) to pay Pan American World Airways in two installments in early and mid-January 1968. Air Viet Nam committed to repay the debt to the government within 10 years with an interest rate of 3% per year. This was a deal that received special attention from the Republic of Vietnam because it simultaneously purchased two modern commercial jets produced by the United States in the context of the wartime economic difficulties in the South at that time.

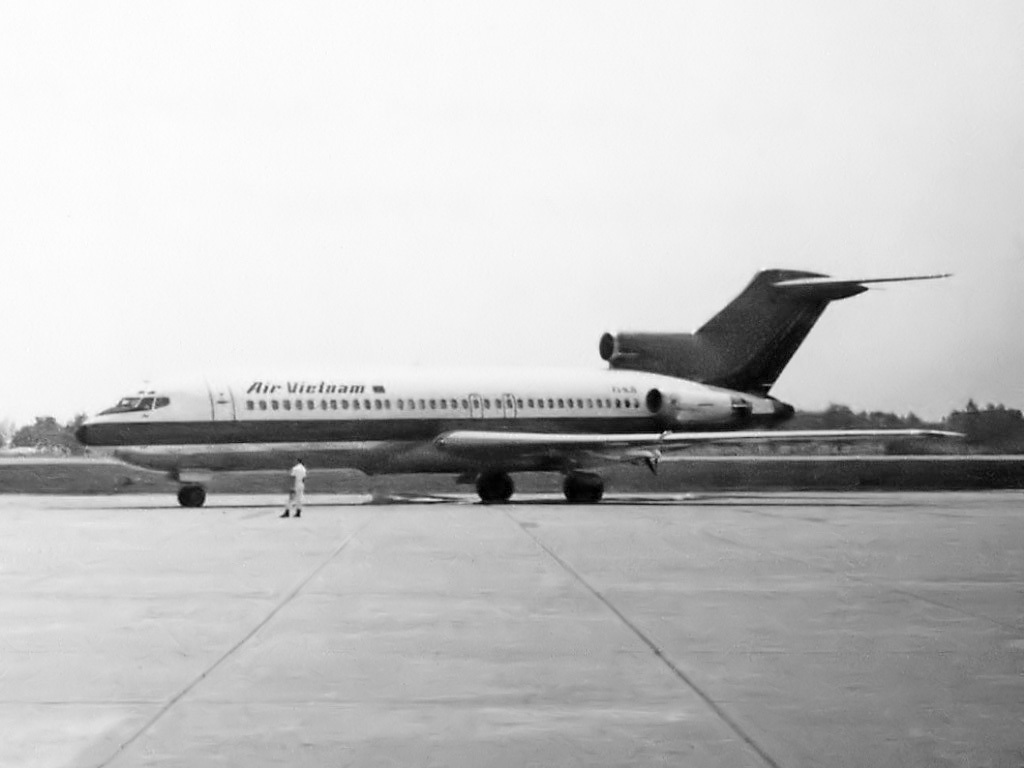
An Air Vietnam Boeing 727 in early 1974.

Air Viet Nam in 1974 had 16 cargo planes transporting fresh vegetables from Da Lat to Saigon when the railway connecting Da Lat and Thap Cham had stopped operating since 1972.

=== Fall of Saigon ===
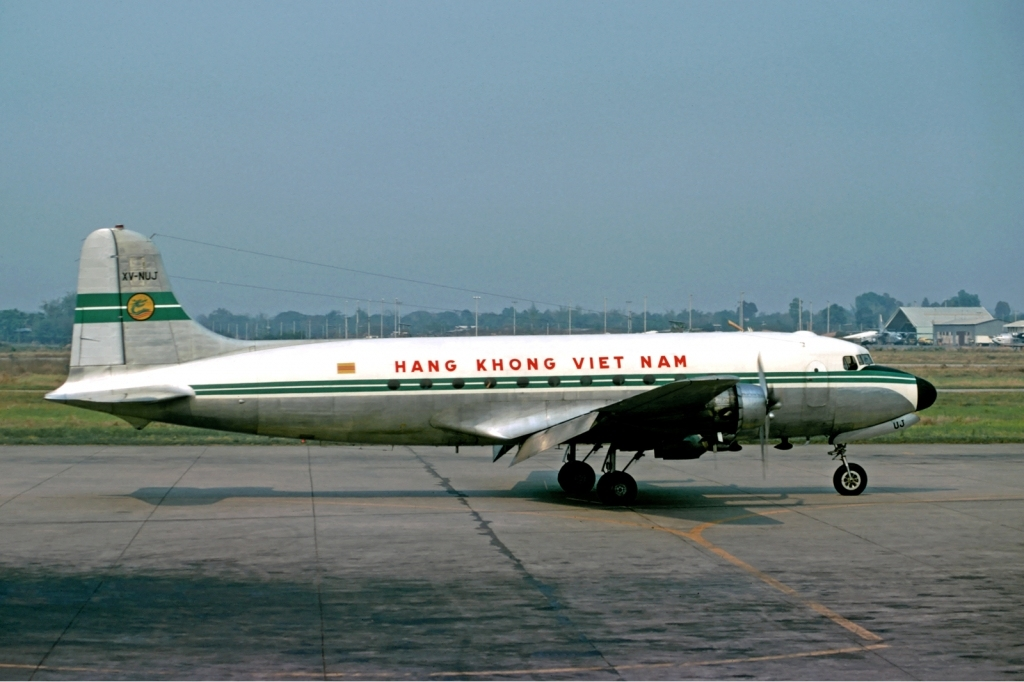
Douglas C-54D in 1975

During the Fall of Saigon and the impending invasion of North Vietnam into South Vietnam, Air Viet Nam decided to assist and help all South Vietnamese citizens to escape to neighboring countries. Many of their pilots and crew worked long hours ferrying South Vietnamese citizens to Thailand, Taiwan, the Philippines, and other Southeast Asian countries to escape the invading North Vietnamese army. One Boeing 707 flew to Taipei for the use of former President Nguyen Van Thieu and his wife, and close aides had been flown into exile on a CIA C-118 transport. Thieu was extended the courtesy once in exile of the Boeing jet as he went from first Taiwan, then the United Kingdom, before finally flying on to the United States where it was returned to Pan Am from which it had been leased. An Air Vietnam aircraft abandoned at the Songshan Airport was later handed over to a Taiwanese airline. One Air Vietnam Boeing 727 was returned to Vietnam from British Hong Kong in early June 1975.

After the war ended and fall of the Republic of Vietnam, in addition to the facilities previously taken over, in 1976 the Vietnamese government agreed to confiscate the remaining assets of Air Vietnam and transfer them to the General Department of Civil Aviation for management and use, including 282 airports of the Republic of Vietnam and 14 DC-type aircraft and many other types of transport aircraft. Among them were seven Douglas DC-3s, five Douglas DC-4s, two Douglas DC-6s and a Boeing 707. In addition, there was a Boeing 727 stranded in Hong Kong. At the same time, 2,166 employees were recalled to service.

The only commercial jet aircraft transferred from Air Vietnam to Vietnam Airlines were one Boeing 707 and one Boeing 727-100.

== Codeshare partners ==
According to the timetable published in 1969, Air Vietnam codeshared with the following airlines:

- Qantas
- Royal Air Cambodge
- Air France
- Union de Transports Aériens
- Air India
- Japan Air Lines
- Cathay Pacific
- KLM Royal Dutch Airlines
- China Air Lines
- Pan Am
- Northwest Orient Airlines
- British Overseas Airways Corporation

== Flight crew ==
Air Viet Nam flight crews were composed of civilians with a mixture of ex-military pilots, (mostly former Republic of Vietnam Air Force), along with a few Americans. However, one American CASI pilot reported that the Taiwanese crew of the leased C-46 always parked its aircraft separately at Tân Sơn Nhứt International Airport in Saigon and kept its distance from the regular Air Viet Nam and CASI crews.

=== Uniforms ===
Pilots for Air Viet Nam wore a distinctive gold/bronze wing with a center shield containing a colored enamel version of the dragon/flag. It can be presumed that some senior grades of pilot and crew existed, although how these were indicated is not clear.

Stewardesses, or flight attendants, wore a gold or bronze metal wing with an embossed dragon emblem. Uniforms consisted of the traditional áo dài in a variety of colors.

== Marketing ==
Advertisements used from the mid-1960s included South Vietnamese Olympians, such as Thach Thi Ngoc, and flamboyant military officer Nguyễn Cao Kỳ, whose wife Madame Nguyễn Cao Kỳ was a flight stewardess before they were married. These celebrities promoted the airline's operation of Viscounts on the "Green Dragon Route", alternating flights from Saigon to Siem Reap, Cambodia; Bangkok, Thailand; and Hong Kong. Timetables indicate domestic routes covering destinations as far north as Huế, as far south as Cà Mau, and including almost every major city in between.

== Destinations ==
=== Domestic ===
- Buôn Ma Thuột
- Cà Mau
- Can Tho
- Đà Lạt
- Đà Nẵng
- Huế
- Kon Tum
- Nha Trang
- Phan Rang
- Phan Thiết
- Phú Quốc
- Pleiku
- Quảng Đức
- Quảng Nam
- Quảng Ngãi
- Quy Nhơn
- Rạch Giá
- Saigon (Hub)
- Tuy Hòa

=== International ===
- Cambodia: Phnom Penh
- Japan: Osaka, Tokyo
- Laos: Vientiane
- Malaysia: Kuala Lumpur
- Philippines: Manila
- Republic of China: Taipei
- Singapore: Singapore International Airport
- Thailand: Bangkok

== Incidents and accidents ==
- 16 August 1954: Bristol Freighter 21E F-VNAI crashed on the bank of the Sedone River (a tributary of the Mekong River) while on approach to Pakse for an emergency landing following engine failure, killing 47 of 55 on board. The aircraft was flying Red River refugees from Hanoi to Saigon.
- 10 November 1962: Douglas C-47B XV-NID crashed into a mountain 19.6 km (12.2 mi) northwest of Da Nang Airport due to a navigation error in bad weather, killing all 27 on board. The aircraft was operating on a flight route from Phu Bai Airport to Da Nang Airport.
- 1962: Douglas C-54B XV-NUA was reportedly written off at an unknown location. No casualties were reported.
- 16 September 1965: Douglas C-47A XV-NIC was shot down by Communist ground fire shortly after takeoff and crashed 11 km (6.8 mi) northeast of Quảng Ngãi, killing all 39 on board; one passenger who was found alive after the crash died a few hours later.
- 2 April 1969: Douglas DC-6B XV-NUC was destroyed on the ground at Hue-Citadel Airfield during a Communist attack.
- 1 May 1969: Douglas C-54B F-BELL burned out on the ground while parked at Saigon Airport.
- 20 September 1969: Douglas C-54D XV-NUG collided with US Air Force McDonnell Douglas F-4 Phantom II 67-0393 and crashed into a field near Da Nang, killing 75 of the 77 on board and two people working in the field. The Phantom was able to land safely and its two crew members were uninjured, while the survivor from the C-54 was a 12-year-old boy and a man. The C-54 was operating on a flight route from Saigon to Pleiku Airport to Da Nang Airport. When the pilot of the Phantom was cleared to land on Runway 17R by ATC, the pilot of the C-54, cleared to land on Runway 17L, thought that the message was addressed to his aircraft and turned right for approach to Runway 17R. This brought the C-54 in the path of the Phantom and the two aircraft collided.
- 22 December 1969: Douglas DC-6B B-2005 suffered an explosion and hydraulic failure while descending for Nha Trang Airport. After a low level pass to check the landing gear, a nose-high flapless approach was made. The aircraft touched down, but became airborne again after application of reverse thrust. The throttles were closed and the aircraft landed again, but overran the runway, struck a concrete pylon and caught fire, killing 10 of 77 on board and 24 on the ground. A bomb placed in the front left lavatory detonated during approach, blowing a 1.5 m (4.9 ft) hole in the fuselage and damaging hydraulic lines.
- 22 July 1970: A 20-year-old U.S. Army private, George M. Hardin, hijacked a DC-4 en route from Pleiku to Saigon. Hardin allowed the 65 passengers aboard to disembark from the plane before moving to the cockpit and threatening the pilot with a small knife. He was detained in Saigon after attempting to force the pilot, Floyd R. Derieux, to take him to Hong Kong, but the pilot told him the DC-4 could not carry enough fuel to make the trip. There were no fatalities.
- 30 September 1970: Douglas DC-3DST-318A B-305 crashed into a hill in the Hai Van Mountains at 970 m (3,180 ft) near Da Nang while attempting to divert to Da Nang Airport due to weather conditions at its intended destination of Phu Bai Airport, Huế. Three of the 38 people on board were killed.
- 1 November 1970: Curtiss C-46 B-1543 force-landed on a beach at Quy Nhơn due to fuel system problems; the aircraft sank in sand and flooded out at high tide. The aircraft was operating on a flight from Saigon to Quang Ngai.
- 22 August 1971: Douglas DC-3A-375 B-304 was written off at Kampot Airport.
- 24 September 1972: Douglas C-54D XV-NUH crashed into a marshy area 23 miles from Saigon following a loss of control due to mechanical failure, killing 10 of 13 on board. The aircraft was operating a flight from Vientiane Airport to Tan Son Nhat International Airport.
- 19 March 1973: Douglas C-54D XV-NUI crashed 4.1 mi S of Buon Ma Thuot Airport following an unexplained mid-air explosion, killing all 58 on board. The aircraft was operating a flight from Tan Son Nhat International Airport to Da Nang. A bomb explosion was not ruled out.
- 5 September 1973: Boeing 727-121C XV-NJC suffered an explosion in the galley at 15,000 ft (4,600 m) 15 minutes after takeoff from Bangkok, injuring two passengers and a stewardess; the aircraft was able to return and land safely at Bangkok. Although it was thought that a bomb exploded, a Royal Thai Air Force investigation concluded that a defective broiler in the galley caused the explosion. Although the aircraft was repaired and returned to service, it was written off following the hijacking and crash of Flight 706 in 1974.
- 17 November 1973: Douglas C-47B XV-NIE struck a mountain at 400 m (1,300 ft) 20 kilometres (12 mi) NNW of Quảng Ngãi killing all 27 people on board. The crew, flying VFR in IMC, had gotten lost and flew too low in a mountainous area while attempting to reach Chu Lai, near the crash site. The aircraft was operating a domestic scheduled passenger flight from Tan Son Nhat International Airport to Quảng Ngãi Airport.
- 20 February 1974: Douglas C-54A XV-NUM was hijacked en route from Quy Nhơn to Da Nang. The hijacker was a 19-year-old South Vietnamese man demanding to go to Đồng Hới, North Vietnam. The pilot stated that the aircraft had to stop at Đông Hà to refuel, but flew to Huế instead. The hijacker realized he had been tricked and detonated explosives in the front part of the aircraft, killing three passengers and injuring several others. The explosion also blew a 2 m × 3 m (6.6 ft × 9.8 ft) hole in the port side of the fuselage and broke three starboard side windows. The aircraft was written off.
- 15 September 1974: Flight 706 - Le Duc Tan, a ranger in the South Vietnamese army who had recently been demoted from captain to lieutenant for the theft of two cars in Da Nang, smooth-talked his way past security checkpoints and hijacked the Boeing 727 en route from Da Nang to Saigon, demanding to go to Hanoi. The pilot explained that it was not possible and needed to stop at Phan Rang. During the approach, Tan detonated two hand grenades, and the aircraft crashed when it overshot the runway on an attempted landing. All 75 persons on board, including 67 passengers and eight crew members, were killed.
- 12 March 1975: Douglas C-54D XV-NUJ crashed 16 mi from Pleiku, killing all 26 on board; the wreckage was not examined due to hostile conditions in the area.

== See also ==
- Royal Air Cambodge
- Royal Air Lao
