= Tho Xuan Airport =

Airport in Vietnam

Thọ Xuân Airport Sân bay Thọ Xuân Cảng hàng không Thọ Xuân
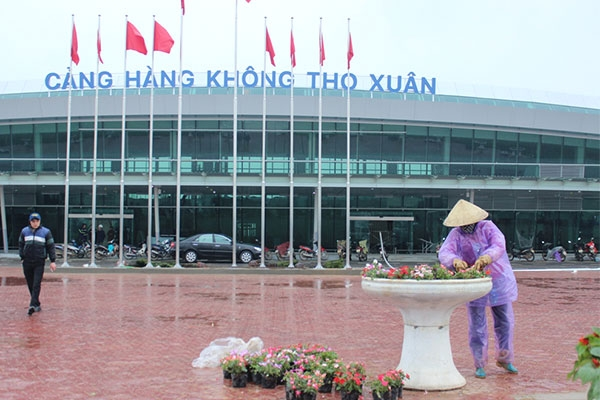
- IATA: THD; ICAO: VVTX

Summary
- Airport type: Public / military
- Operator: Vietnam People's Air Force
- Serves: Thanh Hóa
- Location: Sao Vàng
- Elevation AMSL: 59 ft (18 m)
- Coordinates: 19°54′6″N 105°28′4″E

Map
- Location of airport in Vietnam

Runways
Direction	Length		Surface
Direction	m	ft	Surface
13/31	3,200	10,498	Concrete

Statistics (2022)
- Passengers: 1,612,958 (▲128.44%)

Thọ Xuân Airport (IATA: THD, ICAO: VVTX) — also known as Thanh Hoá Air Base or Bái Thượng Air Base, formerly Sao Vàng Airport (Vietnamese: Sân bay Sao Vàng) — is an airport located in Sao Vàng Commune, Thanh Hóa Province, 40 km northwest of the provincial capital Thanh Hóa. The airport is currently operated by Vietnam People's Air Force (VPAF).

This airport handled 90,000 passengers in 2013, 160,000 passengers in 2014 and is estimated to serve 550,000 passengers in 2015, an increase of more than 300%

== History ==
=== Vietnam War ===
The air base was built in 1968 and was used as a forward staging bases with MiGs temporarily deployed from other VPAF bases.

On the morning of 13 April 1972 the airfield was attacked by B-52s, destroying one MiG-17 and cratering the runway. The base was attacked again by US Navy A-6s in May 1972. On 15 June U.S. fighter-bombers again attacked the base cratering the runway. The base was attacked again on 18 June with further damage to the runway. The base was attacked again on 11 and 12 November 1972 with six craters reported in the runway.

=== Current use ===
The base is home to the VPAF 923rd Fighter-bomber Squadron operating the Sukhoi Su-30MKK.

The government of Vietnam implemented an upgrading project to add more civil facilities in order to turn the airport into a mixed civilian/military airport in early 2013. It is planned to become a relief airport for Hanoi's Noi Bai International Airport.

== Airlines and destinations ==
Airlines	Destinations
Bamboo Airways	Con Dao, Ho Chi Minh City, Phu Quoc, Quy Nhon
Pacific Airlines	Ho Chi Minh City
VietJet Air	Buon Ma Thuot, Can Tho, Da Lat, Da Nang, Ho Chi Minh City
Vietnam Airlines	Buon Ma Thuot, Da Lat, Da Nang, Ho Chi Minh City
