= Da Nang International Airport =

Commercial airport serving Da Nang, Vietnam

Da Nang International Airport Sân bay quốc tế Đà Nẵng Cảng hàng không quốc tế Đà Nẵng
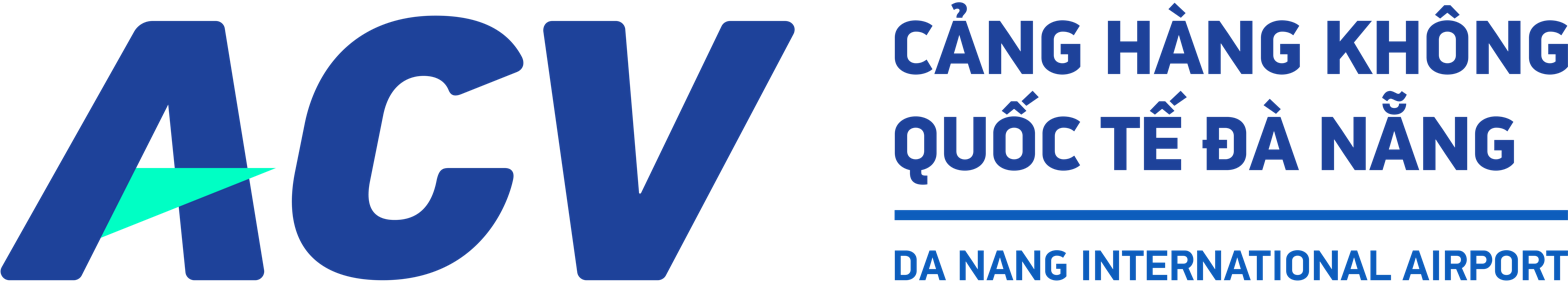

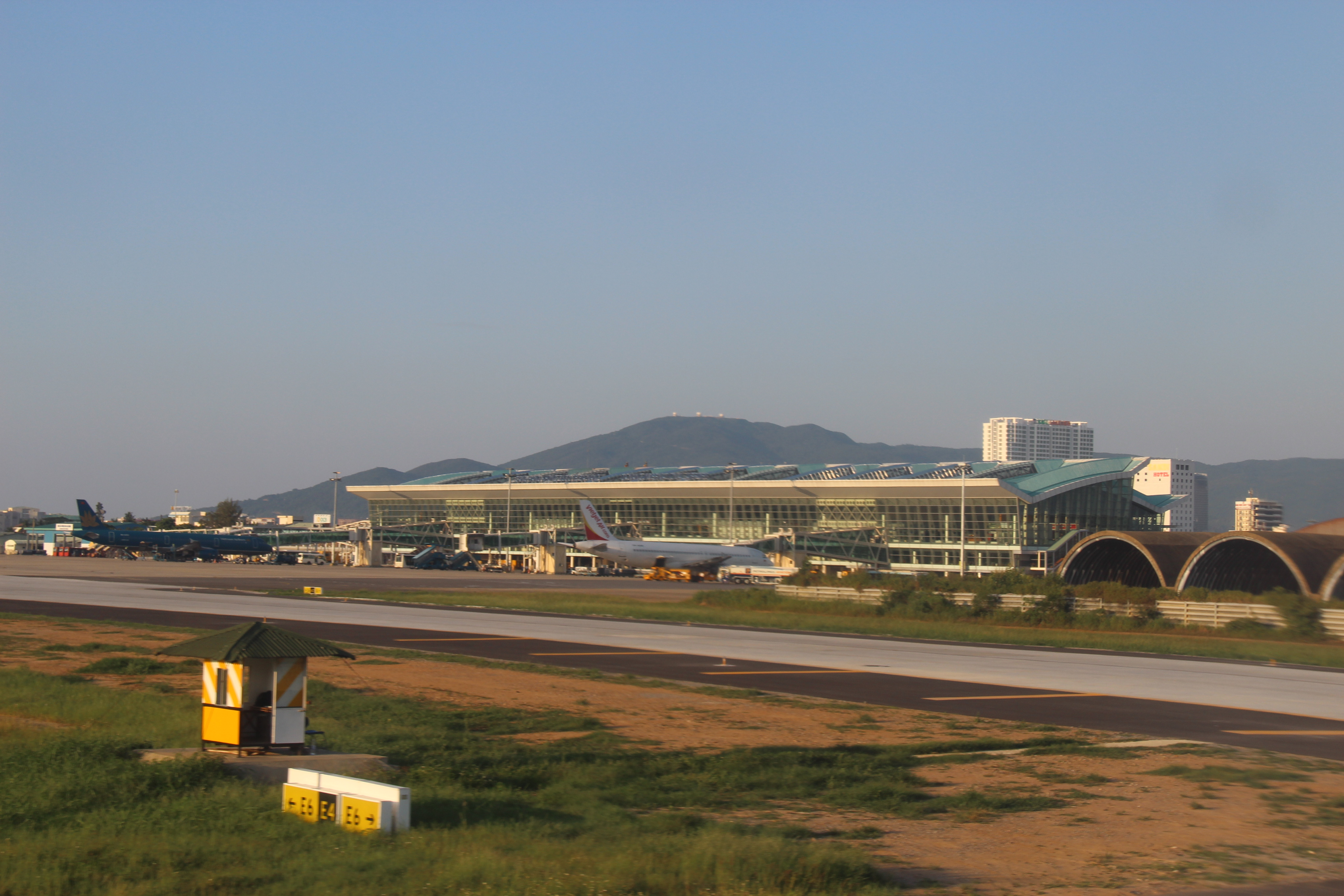
- The airport's terminal, as seen in 2012.
- IATA: DAD; ICAO: VVDN

Summary
- Airport type: Public / military
- Owner/Operator: Airports Corporation of Vietnam
- Serves: Da Nang
- Location: Hòa Cường, Da Nang, Vietnam
- Hub for: Vietnam Airlines; VASCO
- Operating base for: Bamboo Airways; VietJet Air
- Elevation AMSL: 10 m (33 ft)
- Coordinates: 16°02′38″N 108°11′58″E
- Website: www.danangairport.vn

Maps
- 2030 masterplan
- Location of airport in Da Nang DAD/VVDN (Vietnam)

Runways
Direction	Length		Surface
Direction	m	ft	Surface
17L/35R	3,500	11,483	Concrete
17R/35L	3,048	10,000	Asphalt

Statistics (2019)
- Total passengers: 15,543,598 ▲17.5%
- Source: Taseco Airs

Da Nang International Airport (IATA: DAD, ICAO: VVDN) is an international airport serving the area of Central Vietnam and the region's largest city Da Nang. It is the third international airport in the country, after Tan Son Nhat International Airport (Ho Chi Minh City) and Noi Bai International Airport (Hanoi).

In addition to its civil aviation, the runway is shared with the Vietnamese People's Air Force (VPAF, the Không Quân Nhân Dân Việt Nam), although military activities are now extremely limited. The airport served 5 million passengers in 2014, reaching that passenger count around six years sooner than expected. An expansion of the new terminal is currently considered to increase its capacity to 10 million passengers per annum by 2020. This airport handled 6,722,587 passengers in 2015, an increase of 34.7% compared with that of 2014.

This airport handled 11 million passengers in 2017, an increase of 24.1% compared to that of 2016. The airport has two separate terminals for international and domestic passengers, with a total passenger capacity of 11 million per annum as at 2018. The Hanoi-Danang and Ho Chi Minh City-Danang routes have respectively 319 and 250 weekly flights and are, in order, the second and third busiest air routes in Vietnam after the Hanoi-Ho Chi Minh route (475 flights).

In 2024, it was ranked 94th in the list of World's Top 100 Airports by Skytrax, certified as a 3-star airport with its international terminal rated a 5-star. It is set to have the first smart terminal in Vietnam, under a partnership signed with FPT Software.

== History ==
=== Colonial French ===
Situated on flat, sandy ground on the south side of the major port city of Da Nang, the area was ideal for an airfield, having unobstructed approaches to its north–south runways. Tourane Airport was built by the French colonial government in the 1940s as a civilian airport. During World War II, and the Japanese occupation of French Indochina, the Imperial Japanese Army Air Force used it as a military air base.

B-26C Serial 44-34109 of the French Air Force over Indochina, 1952. This aircraft was returned to the USAF in October 1955 and scrapped.

After the war, the facility was used by the French Air Force during the French Indochina War (1945–1954). In 1953/54 the French laid a NATO-standard 7,800-foot (2,400 m) asphalt runway at Tourane and stationed loaned American B-26s "Invaders" of the Groupe de Bombardement 1/19 Gascogne. In 1954 after the Geneva Peace Accords, these B-26s were returned to the United States.

=== Vietnam War ===
In 1955, the newly established Republic of Vietnam Air Force (VNAF) inherited from the French a token force of fifty-eight aircraft. These included a few squadrons of Cessna L-19 observation aircraft, C-47 transports and various utility aircraft. Tourane Airfield was turned over to civilian use, with the South Vietnamese using facilities at Bien Hoa, Nha Trang and at Tan Son Nhut, near Saigon.

In 1957 the VNAF re-established a presence at the renamed Da Nang Airport, stationing the 1st Liaison Squadron with Cessna L-19s. The South Vietnamese Army (ARVN) also used Da Nang as a ranger training facility.

Air Vietnam also used the facility from 1951 to 1975 for civilian domestic and international flights within Southeast Asia.

During the Vietnam War (1959–1975), the facility was known as Da Nang Air Base, and was a major United States military base. Once little more than a provincial airfield, the facility was expanded to 2,350 acres (950 ha) with two 10,000-foot (3,048 m) asphalt runways with concrete touchdown pads, parallel taxiways, and a heliport.

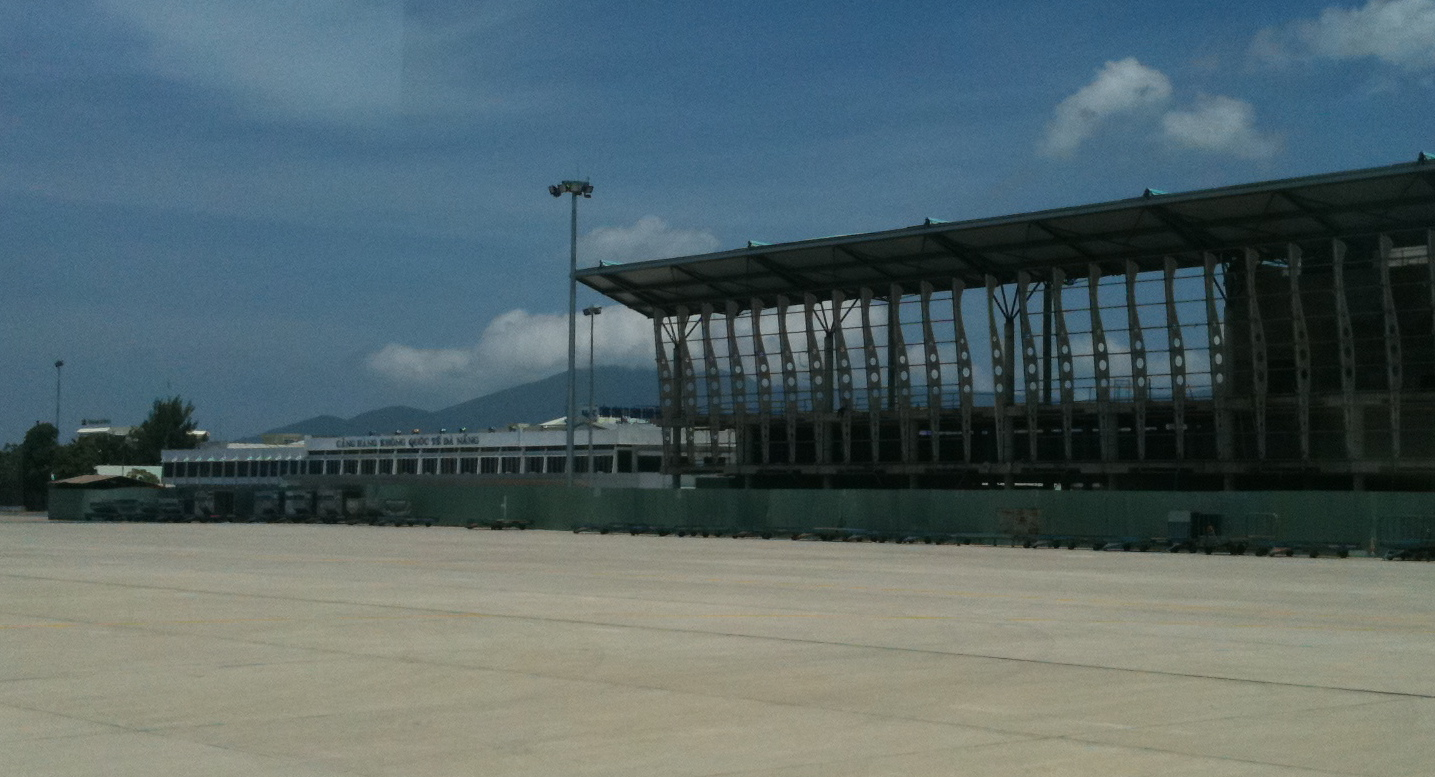
The airport in 2010, with the ongoing construction of the new terminal while the old facility was still there.

During the war the VNAF's 1st Air Division, and the USAF's 23d Air Base Group, 6252nd Tactical Wing, 35th Tactical Fighter Wing, 366th Tactical Fighter Wing, 362nd Tactical Electronic Warfare Squadron, and the U.S. Navy (a detachment of VQ-1) operated from the base.

The Vietnam-US joint project to clean dioxin pollution was completed in 2018. The airport had previously seen high concentrations of dioxin in soil and sediment samples from the airport following the handling of Agent Orange and other herbicides during the Vietnam War.

=== COVID-19 pandemic ===
According to the regulation of the Ministry of Transport issued on 27 July 2020, the airport was temporarily closed from 28 July to 7 September to prevent an outbreak in the city.

== Facilities ==
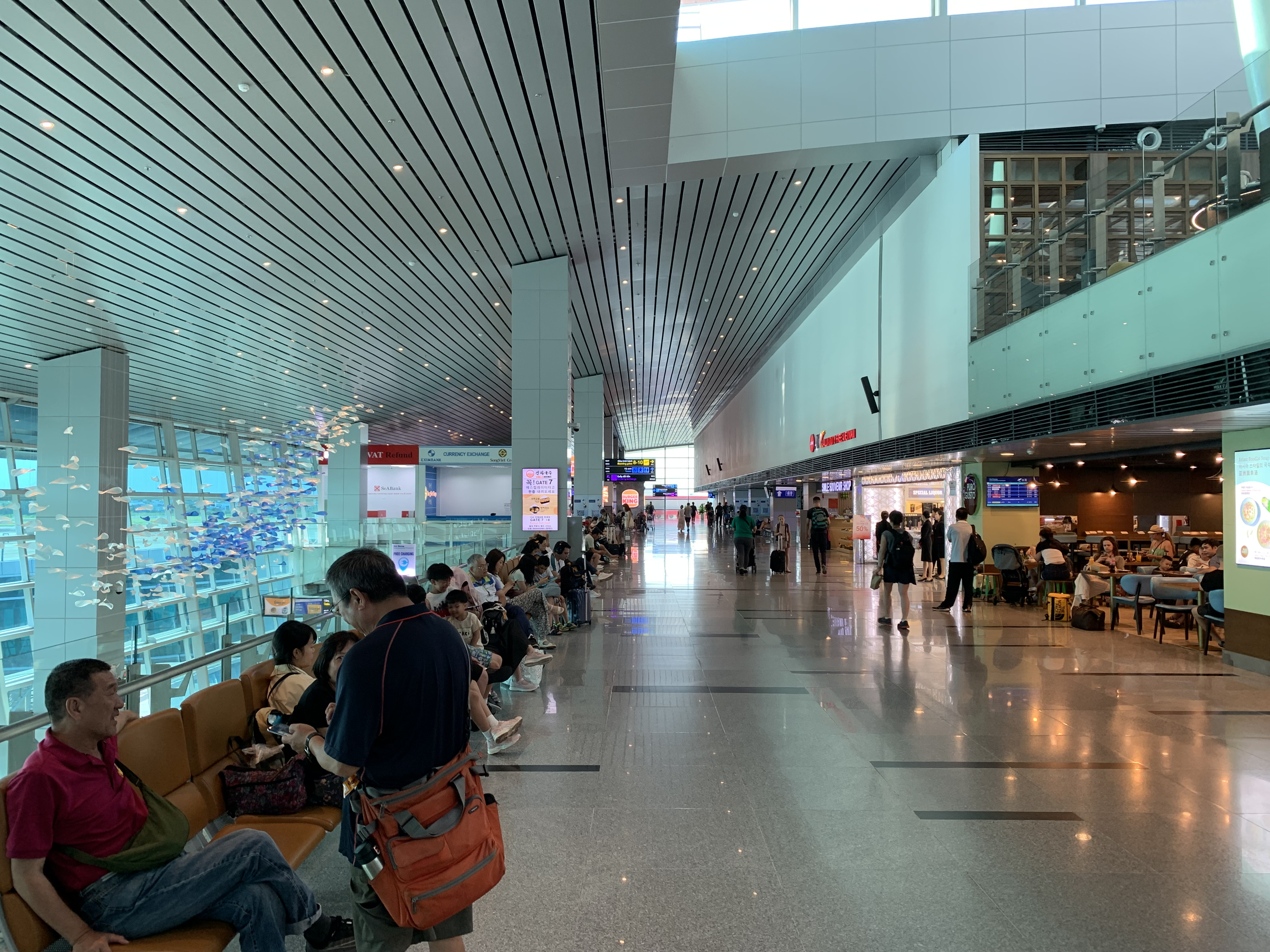
Inside the International Terminal of Da Nang Airport

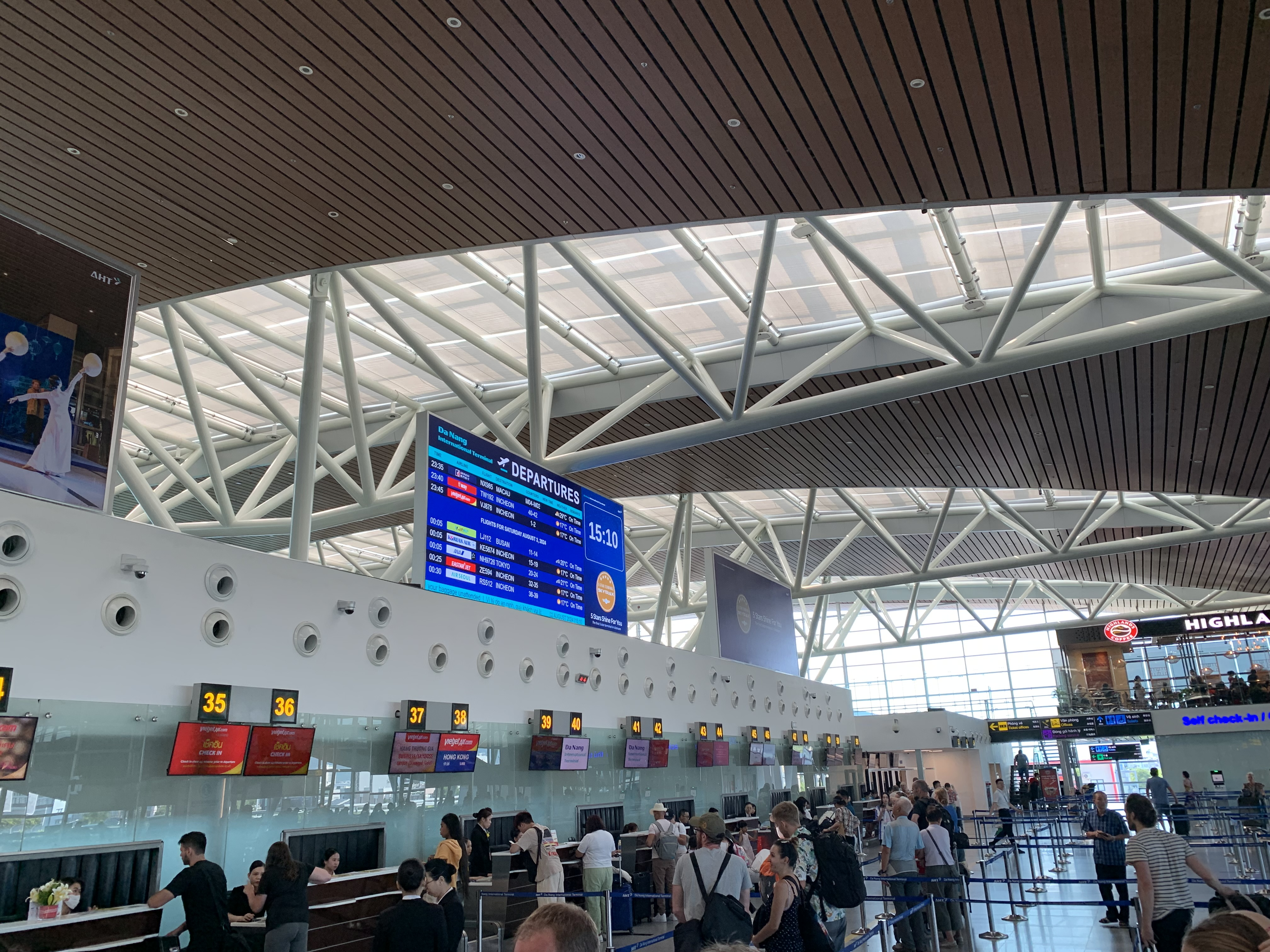
Departures hall

Da Nang International Airport has two 10,000-foot (3,048 m) paved, parallel runways (17–35 orientation) capable of handling large, modern aircraft such as Boeing 747s, 767s and Airbus A320s. Traffic volume at Da Nang averages 100 to 150 flights every 24 hours. Annual traffic was circa 1.45 million in 2007 and was expected to reach four million by 2020.

A new 20,000m² terminal, costing US$84 million with a capacity of 4 million passengers per year, opened to receive its first domestic flight on 15 December 2011. The feasibility study for the renovation of the airport was partially sponsored by the United States Trade and Development Agency (USTDA), and was completed by PriceWaterhouseCoopers in 2006. The new terminal includes five boarding gates, baggage handling systems, departure and arrivals areas, flight information display system (FIDS), common user terminal equipment (CUTE), fire detection systems and comprehensive public address and security systems, including screening equipment. Additionally, one of the airport's two runways was extended from 3,048 metres (10,000 ft) to 3,500 metres (11,483 ft). After completion, and at a cost of US$160 million, the airport now has a total capacity of six million passengers per year.

A new international terminal 2, covering 48,000m2, with a total investment sum of US$154 million and a designed capacity of 6 million passenger per year was put into use on 5 May 2017. In 2026, Airports Corporation of Vietnam proposed major renovations for Da Nang, which includes the total reconstruction of the 35L/17R runway, which is structurally degraded, alongside the eventual expansion and upgrade of the 2 terminals.

== Airlines and destinations ==
Airlines	Destinations
Aero K	Cheongju
Air Astana	Seasonal: Almaty
Air Busan	Busan, Seoul–Incheon
Air Cambodia	Phnom Penh, Siem Reap
Air Macau	Macau
Air Premia	Seoul–Incheon
Air Seoul	Seoul–Incheon
AirAsia	Kuala Lumpur–International
Asiana Airlines	Busan, Seoul–Incheon
Bamboo Airways	Hanoi, Ho Chi Minh City, Macau
Batik Air Malaysia	Kuala Lumpur–International
Belavia	Seasonal charter: Minsk
Cambodia Airways	Phnom Penh
Cebu Pacific	Manila
China Airlines	Taipei–Taoyuan
Eastar Jet	Seoul–Incheon
Emirates	Bangkok–Suvarnabhumi, Dubai–International
EVA Air	Taipei–Taoyuan
Hai Au Aviation	Dong Hoi, Hue
HK Express	Hong Kong
Hong Kong Airlines	Hong Kong
Jeju Air	Seoul–Incheon
Jin Air	Busan, Seoul–Incheon
Korean Air	Seoul–Incheon; Seasonal Charter: Busan
Lao Airlines	Vientiane
Malaysia Airlines	Kuala Lumpur–International
Myanmar Airways International	Yangon
Philippine Airlines	Manila
Philippines AirAsia	Manila
Qanot Sharq	Tashkent
Royal Air Philippines	Manila
S7 Airlines	Irkutsk (begins 2 March 2027)
Scoot	Singapore
Singapore Airlines	Singapore
Starlux Airlines	Taipei–Taoyuan
Sun PhuQuoc Airways	Hanoi, Ho Chi Minh City, Phu Quoc
Thai AirAsia	Bangkok–Don Mueang
Thai Airways International	Bangkok–Suvarnabhumi (resumes 1 December 2026)
Thai VietJet Air	Bangkok–Suvarnabhumi
Tigerair Taiwan	Kaohsiung, Taipei–Taoyuan
Trinity Airways	Cheongju, Daegu, Seoul–Incheon
VietJet Air	Ahmedabad, Buon Ma Thuot, Busan, Can Tho, Da Lat, Hai Phong, Hanoi, Ho Chi Minh City, Jakarta–Soekarno-Hatta (begins 20 December 2026), Kuala Lumpur–International, Nha Trang, Phu Quoc, Seoul–Incheon, Singapore, Tokyo–Haneda, Vinh; Seasonal Charter: Almaty, Astana, Davao, Kazan, Khabarovsk, Krasnoyarsk, Minsk, Moscow–Sheremetyevo, Novokuznetsk, Novosibirsk, Manila, Vladivostok
Vietnam Airlines	Bangkok–Suvarnabhumi, Chengdu–Tianfu, Da Lat, Ha Long, Hai Phong, Hanoi, Ho Chi Minh City, Nha Trang, Osaka–Kansai, Phu Quoc, Seoul–Incheon, Shanghai–Pudong, Singapore, Thanh Hoa, Tokyo–Narita
Vietravel Airlines	Hanoi, Ho Chi Minh City

== Accidents and incidents ==
- On 30 September 1970, Douglas DC-3DST B-305 of Air Vietnam crashed into a hill near Da Nang while attempting to divert to Da Nang Airport due to weather conditions at its intended destination of Phu Bai Airport, Huế. Three of the 38 people on board were killed.
