= 1969 Da Nang mid-air collision =

Aviation accident in Vietnam

Accident
- Date: 20 September 1969
- Summary: Mid-air collision on approach
- Site: Near Da Nang Air Base, Da Nang, South Vietnam
- Total fatalities: 77
- Total injuries: 5
- Total survivors: 4

First aircraft
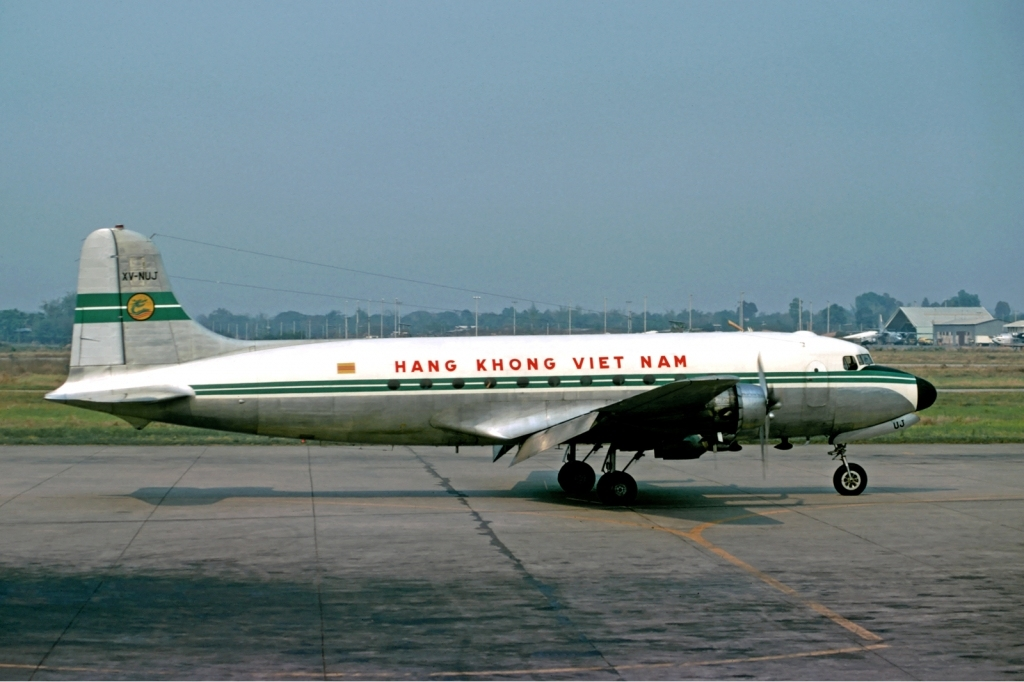
- A Douglas C-54, similar to the aircraft involved
- Type: Douglas C-54 Skymaster
- Operator: Air Vietnam
- Registration: XV-NUG
- Flight origin: Saigon, South Vietnam
- Stopover: Pleiku, South Vietnam
- Destination: Da Nang Air Base, Da Nang, South Vietnam
- Occupants: 77
- Passengers: 71
- Crew: 6
- Fatalities: 75
- Injuries: 2
- Survivors: 2

Second aircraft
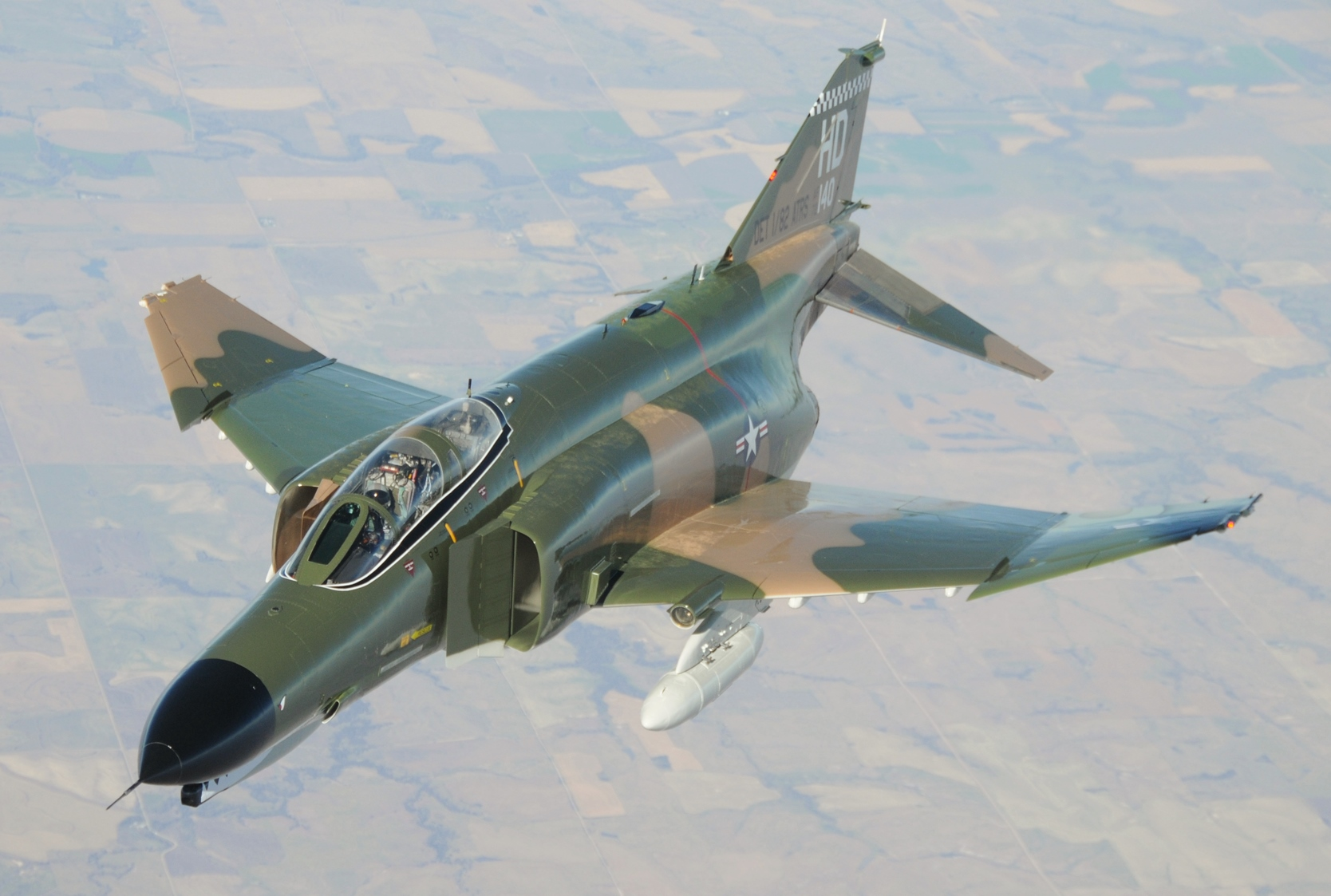
- An F-4 Phantom, similar to the aircraft involved
- Type: McDonnell Douglas F-4E Phantom II
- Operator: United States Air Force
- Registration: 67-0393
- Flight origin: Da Nang Air Base
- Destination: Da Nang Air Base
- Occupants: 2
- Crew: 2
- Fatalities: 0
- Injuries: 1
- Survivors: 2

Ground casualties
- Ground fatalities: 2
- Ground injuries: 2

On 20 September 1969, an Air Vietnam Douglas C-54 and a United States Air Force McDonnell Douglas F-4E Phantom II collided in mid-air on approach to Da Nang Air Base, Da Nang, South Vietnam. Although the navigator ejected from the F-4, injuring himself on landing, the remaining pilot managed to safely land the aircraft. The crew of the C-54 attempted to perform a go-around but were unable to do so because of damage sustained during the collision. The C-54 subsequently crashed into a field, killing 75 of the 77 passengers and crew as well as two people on the ground, and injuring two others.

The C-54 was operating a scheduled domestic passenger flight from Saigon to Da Nang Air Base via Pleiku while the F-4 was returning from a mission. Both aircraft were cleared to land on parallel runways at the base, but the crew of the C-54 mistakenly believed that they were cleared to land on the same runway as the F-4. The C-54 then entered the path of the F-4 and both aircraft collided, tearing off the C-54's starboard horizontal stabilizer.

== Background ==
The aircraft involved in the accident were an Air Vietnam Douglas C-54 Skymaster registered as XV-NUG and a United States Air Force McDonnell Douglas F-4E Phantom II registered as 67-0393. The C-54 was carrying 77 occupants, including 71 passengers and 6 crew members, while the F-4 carried two crew members.

The C-54's passengers were all Vietnamese except for an Indian citizen living in Saigon, while the crew consisted of three flight crew members from the Republic of China and three Vietnamese flight attendants. The flight crew comprised Captain Chen Yi, First Officer T. W. Liu, and Crew Chief W. M. Lee. The F-4's crew consisted of Colonel David Mellish, a deputy commander of the 366th Fighter Wing and the pilot in command, and Major Cornelius A. Thomas, the navigator.

Da Nang Air Base is 380 miles (610 km) northeast of Saigon. The air base was constantly in use by civilian and military aircraft and was at the time considered one of the world's busiest airfields. The air base had two parallel runways: 17 Left and 17 Right. Runway 17 Left was used by commercial aircraft, while Runway 17 Right was used by military aircraft on missions.

== Accident ==
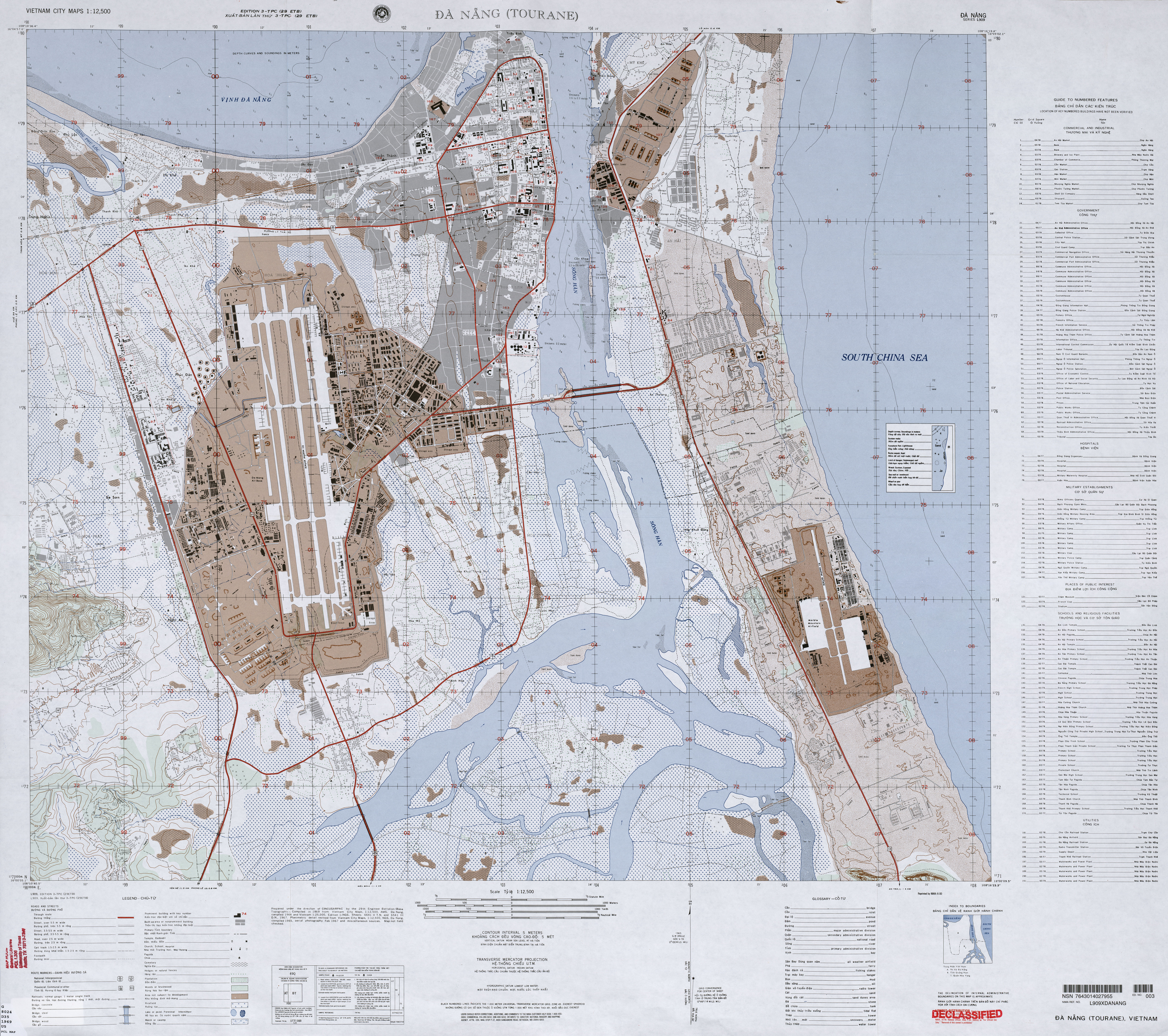
Map of Da Nang Air Base (left).

On 20 September 1969, the Air Vietnam C-54 was operating a scheduled domestic passenger flight from Saigon to Da Nang Air Base with a stopover in Pleiku, South Vietnam, while the F-4 had performed a combat mission and was on its way back to Da Nang Air Base, having expended its payload of bombs and rockets. The C-54's flight from Saigon to Pleiku had been uneventful. The weather was clear, with a high overcast, scattered clouds at lower altitudes, and visibility up to 10 miles (16 km).

At around 16:00, the air base's air traffic control (ATC) cleared both aircraft to land on its parallel runways, with the C-54 scheduled to land on Runway 17 Left and the F-4 on Runway 17 Right. However, the C-54's crew did not fully hear the ATC's instructions, due to either an incorrect interpretation of the instructions or overlapping communications, and believed that the message intended for the F-4, "You are cleared to land on 17-Right", was addressed to them. The C-54's crew subsequently responded, "Roger, 17-Right", which indicated that the crew believed the message was addressed to them. Following the reply, as the C-54 approached Runway 17 Right, it strayed into the path of the descending F-4. At an altitude of 300 feet (91 m), the two aircraft collided, and the F-4 tore off the C-54's starboard horizontal stabilizer and left wing tip.

Following the collision, the F-4 navigator ejected and was injured upon landing, while the pilot successfully landed the damaged aircraft at Da Nang Air Base. The C-54 retracted its landing gear and attempted a go-around, but the missing stabilizer caused the aircraft to crash into a paddy field. The crash killed 69 of the 71 passengers and all six crew members, leaving two passengers injured. The C-54's wreckage was scattered about 200 yards (180 m) from the village of Hoa An; two villagers were killed and two others were injured by flying debris.

== Aftermath ==
U.S. helicopters, ambulances, fire trucks, and other emergency vehicles were deployed to the scene shortly after the crash, and two helicopters arrived within two minutes. South Vietnamese military officials ordered troops to the crash site to prevent looting. One of the C-54's propellers was found more than 100 yards (91 m) away in a paddy field.

The two C-54 survivors were a 12-year-old boy and a man. American rescue teams found the boy in the tail section, while the man had reportedly been thrown from the aircraft on impact. The boy was taken to the Da Nang civil hospital reportedly in good condition, while the man was admitted to the air base's hospital in critical condition with head and leg injuries. The two victims killed on the ground were a mother and her daughter.

The day after the crash, the United States Air Force and the South Vietnamese government opened investigations into the collision. It was the first collision in Vietnam involving a civilian aircraft and an American military aircraft.
