= Vinh International Airport =

Airport in Vietnam

Vinh International Airport Sân bay quốc tế Vinh Cảng hàng không quốc tế Vinh
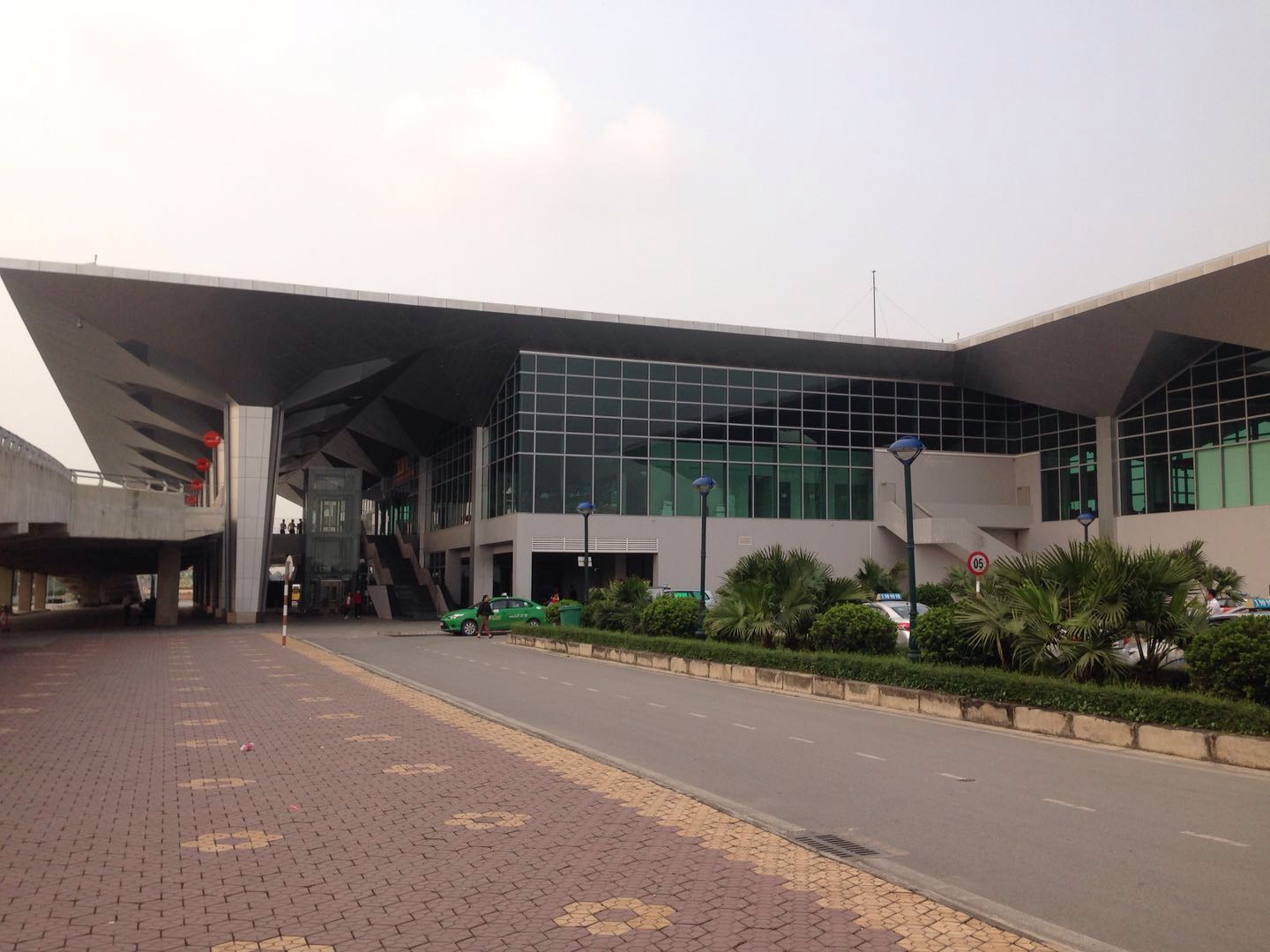
- External view of Vinh International Airport
- IATA: VII; ICAO: VVVH

Summary
- Airport type: Public / military
- Operator: Middle Airport Authority
- Serves: Vinh and Hà Tĩnh
- Location: Vinh Hưng, Nghệ An, Vietnam
- Elevation AMSL: 6 m (20 ft)
- Coordinates: 18°44′12.21″N 105°40′15.17″E
- Website: www.vietnamairport.vn/vinhairport/en/

Map
- Location of airport in Vietnam

Runways
Direction	Length		Surface
Direction	m	ft	Surface
17/35	2,400	7,874	Asphalt

Vinh International Airport (IATA: VII, ICAO: VVVH) is located in Vinh Hưng ward (formerly Vinh city) of Nghệ An province in northern Vietnam. It is a mixed military/civil airport. It used to be one of the two major military airbases in Vietnam, along with Gia Lam Airbase in Hanoi.

During 2002–2015, the airport saw an annual increase of passengers of 43.89%, the highest rate out of all airports in Vietnam. The airport served 1.8 million passengers in 2018.

== History ==
The airport was built by the French in 1937. At first it included a 1,400 m × 30 m (4,593 ft × 98 ft) landing strip, aprons and fuel storage. In 1994, the Vietnamese government invested 20 billion VND to renovate the airport to receive commercial flights. In 1995, the Hanoi - Vinh - Da Nang flight route was inaugurated.

During 2001 — 2003, the airport saw a major upgrade to its infrastructure. The runway was extended to 2,400 m × 45 m (7,874 ft × 148 ft).

A new passenger terminal was constructed in 2014 and opened in 2015, serving domestic flights. The old terminal was converted to a temporary international terminal. In 2019, renovations to the old terminal were completed for it to be fully capable of handling international flights and bigger aircraft.

=== International flights ===
International services at the airport commenced in 2014 with scheduled flights by Vietnam Airlines to Vientiane, Laos using ATR 72 airplanes. Despite a strong demand on road between Vinh and Vientiane with up to 180,000 people passing through border ports in Nghe An province annually, the air service only saw 50% load factor against a 10,000-seat annual capacity. Vietnam Airlines reported a $750,000 loss on the route in 2014. The route was ended on October 25, 2015.

In June 2016, Vietnamese travel agency Vietravel introduced charter service between Vinh and Bangkok, Thailand using Airbus A320 and A321, but the service was ended by June 2017 due to insufficient infrastructure at Vinh Airport. The service was reintroduced in February 2019 when the renovated international terminal at the airport was inaugurated.

== Facilities ==
A new terminal with a designed capacity of 3 million passengers per year and an estimated cost of 800 billion VND (around $37.65 million) was opened in 2015.

== Airlines and destinations ==
Airlines	Destinations
Bamboo Airways	Buon Ma Thuot, Can Tho, Con Dao, Da Lat, Hanoi, Ho Chi Minh City, Quy Nhon
Pacific Airlines	Ho Chi Minh City, Nha Trang
VietJet Air	Buon Ma Thuot, Can Tho, Da Lat, Da Nang, Ho Chi Minh City, Nha Trang, Phu Quoc
Vietnam Airlines	Buon Ma Thuot, Can Tho, Da Lat, Hanoi, Ho Chi Minh City, Nha Trang, Phu Quoc
Vietravel Airlines	Ho Chi Minh City

== Statistics ==
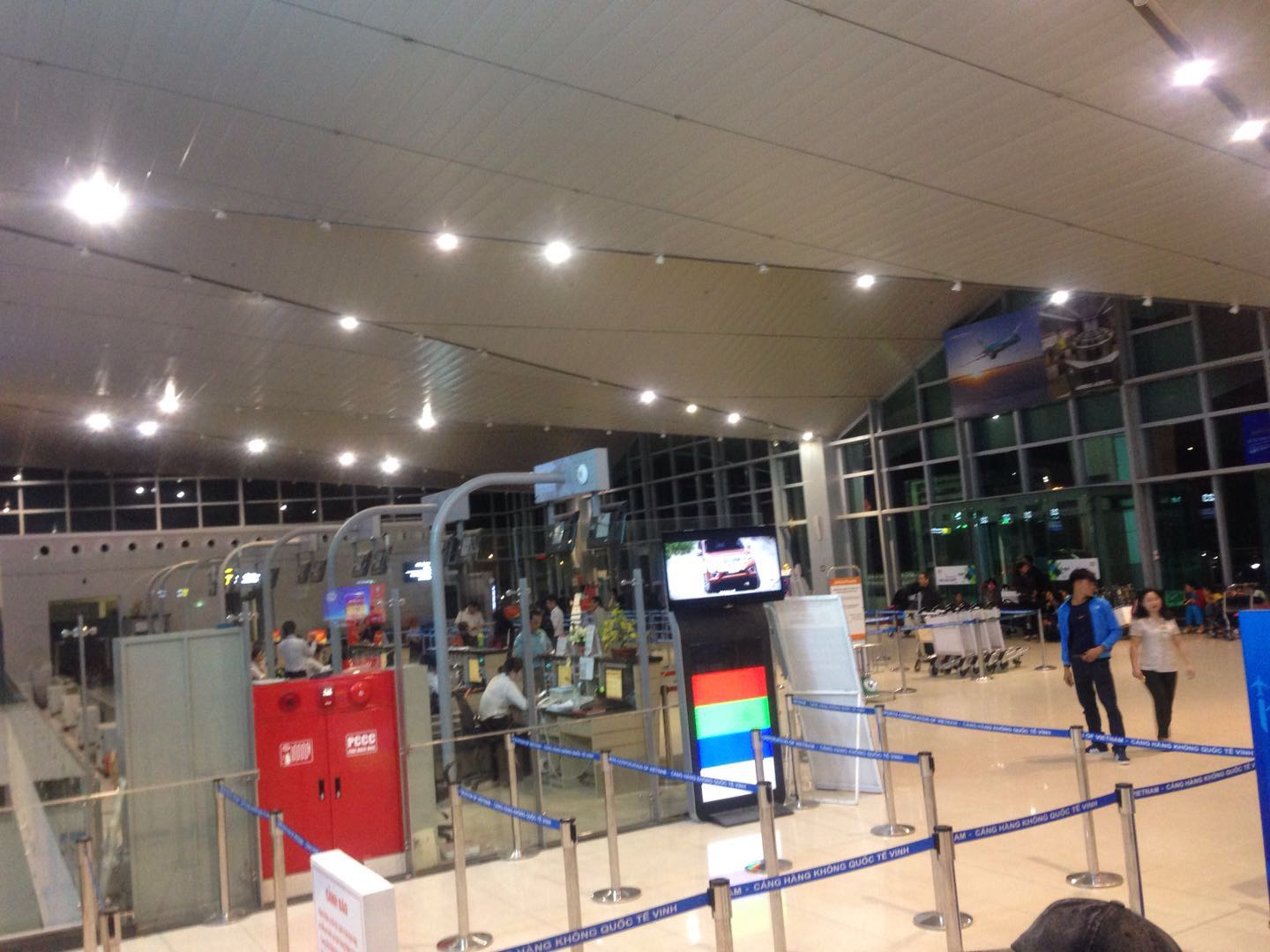
Vinh International Airport interior

Operational statistics of Vinh Airport
Year	Passengers handled	Passenger % change	Cargo (tonnes)	Cargo % change	Aircraft movements	Aircraft % change
2010	276,612	—N/a	—N/a	—N/a	—N/a	—N/a
2011	535,000	▲93.4	1,600	—N/a	4,400	—N/a
2012	635,000	▲18.7	1,800	▲12.5	5,500	▲25
2013	918,000	▲44.4	1,500	▼16.7	7,000	▲27.3
2014	1,220,000	▲33.2	2,900	▲93.3	8,760	▲25.1
2015	1,330,000	▲9.0	—N/a	—N/a	—N/a	—N/a
2016	1.563.387	▲17.3	—N/a	—N/a	—N/a	—N/a

== See also ==
- List of airports in Vietnam
- Gia Lam Airbase
