= Vietnam Air Services Company =

Regional airline of Vietnam

Vietnam Air Services Company Công ty bay Dịch vụ Hàng không

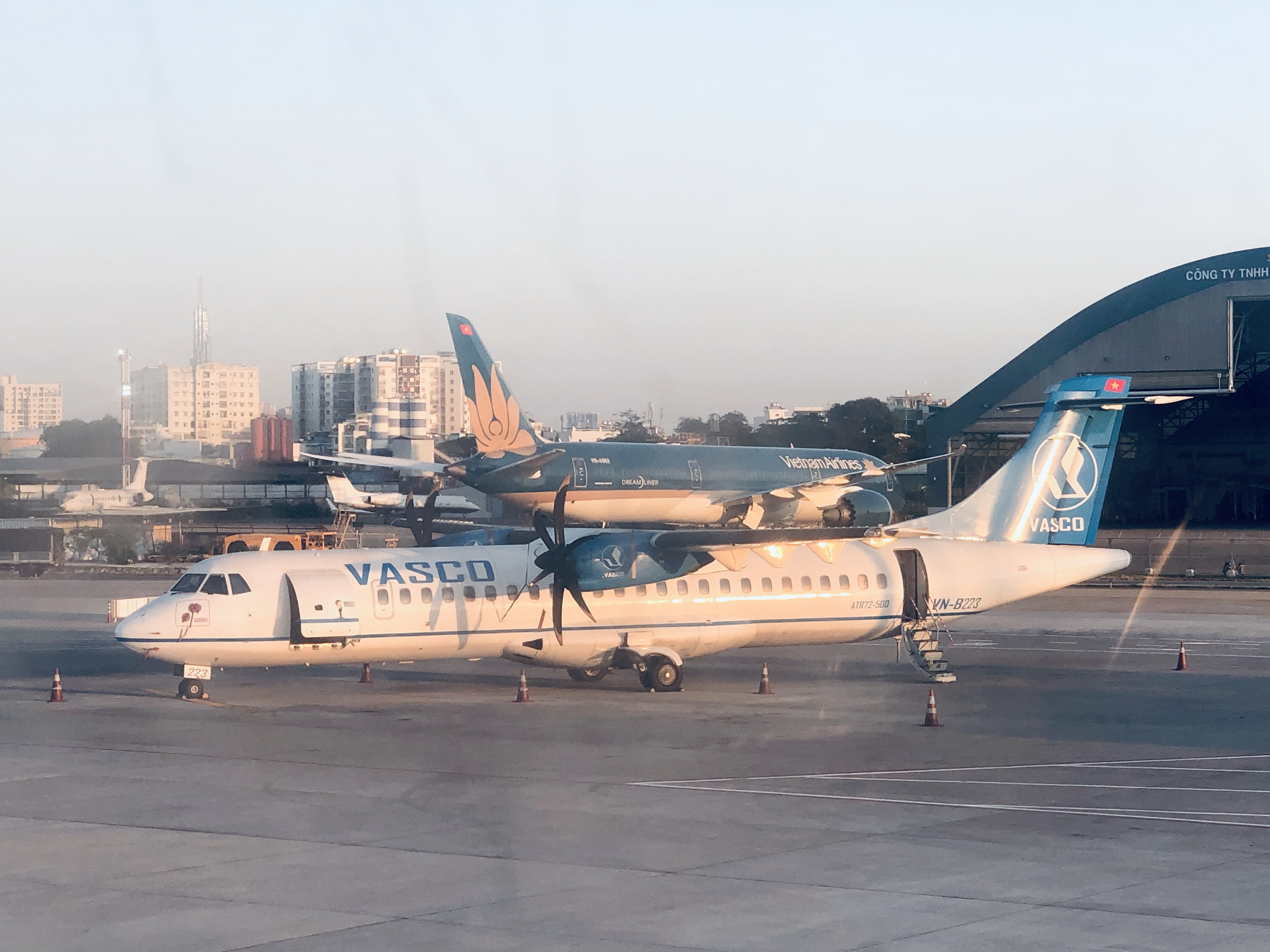
IATA	ICAO	Call sign
0V	VFC	VASCO AIR
- Founded: 1987; 39 years ago
- Hubs: Tan Son Nhat International Airport
- Focus cities: Con Dao Airport
- Frequent-flyer program: Lotusmiles
- Fleet size: 6
- Destinations: 10
- Parent company: Vietnam Airlines
- Headquarters: Ho Chi Minh City, Vietnam
- Key people: Bui Ngoc Hoang
- Website: www.vasco.com.vn

The Vietnam Air Services Company (Vietnamese: Công ty Bay Dịch vụ Hàng không, lit. 'Aviation Service Flying Company'), operating as its acronym VASCO, is an airline headquartered in Tân Bình district, Ho Chi Minh City, Vietnam. A fully-owned division of Vietnam Airlines, it mainly operates regional scheduled flights on behalf of Vietnam Airlines. It also conducts charter flights, medical evacuations, search and rescue (SAR) operations, oil platforms flights, and other aviation services.

VASCO was established by a government directive in 1987, and has always been a part of Vietnam Airlines, the national carrier. It began scheduled passenger flights independently of Vietnam Airlines in 2004, and there were plans for it to be partially privatized. VASCO's flights are largely marketed and fly under Vietnam Airlines identity, with VASCO being the affiliated regional operator.

== Destinations ==
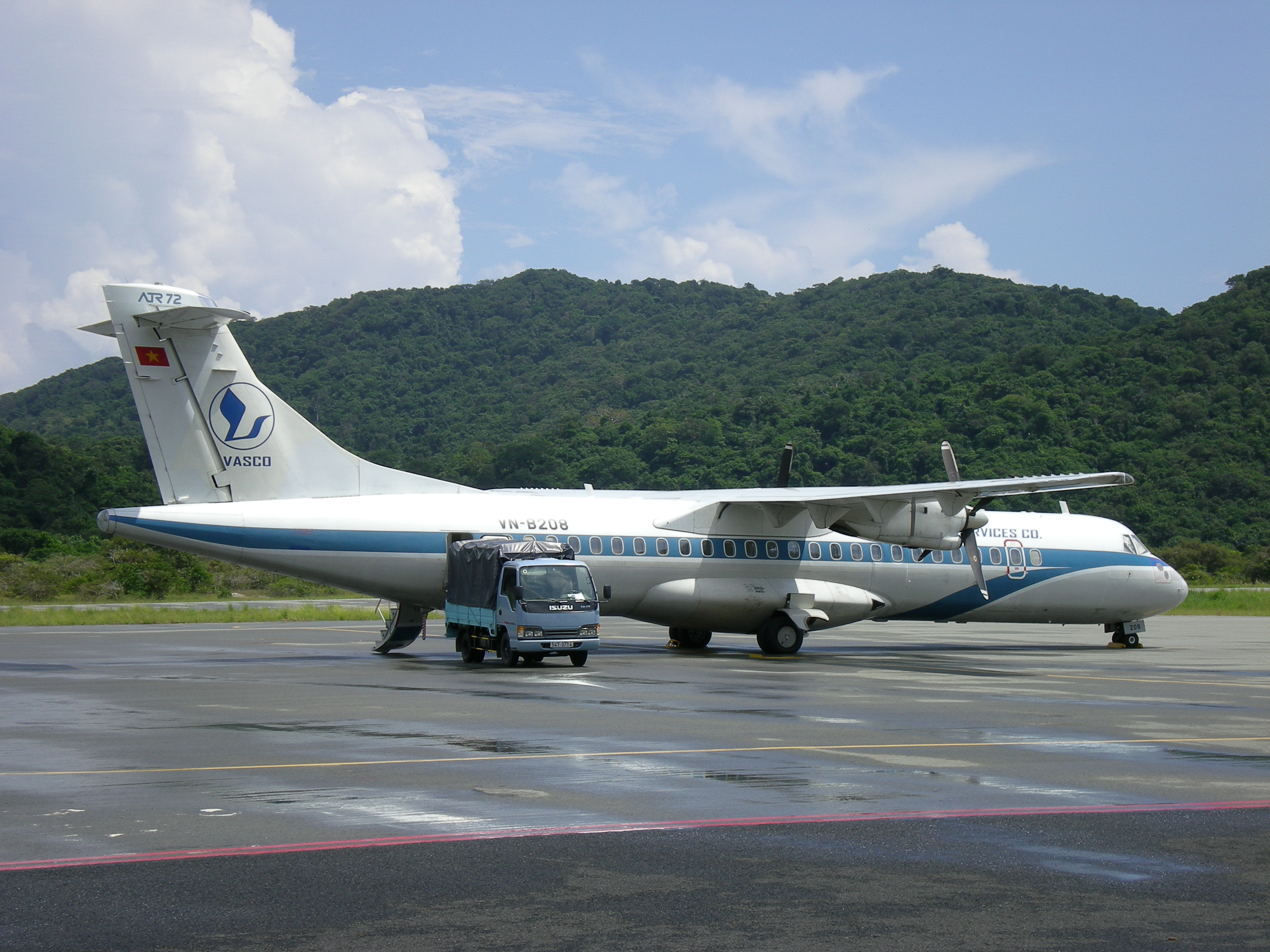
VASCO ATR 72-500 on the ground with old livery at Con Dao Airport, Vietnam

As of 2024, VASCO currently flies to ten destinations in Vietnam.

Country	City	Airport	Notes	Refs
Vietnam	Cần Thơ	Can Tho International Airport		
Vietnam	Côn Đảo	Con Dao Airport	Focus city	
Vietnam	Cà Mau	Ca Mau Airport		
Vietnam	Ho Chi Minh City	Tan Son Nhat International Airport	Hub	
Vietnam	Phu Quoc	Phu Quoc International Airport		
Vietnam	Rạch Giá	Rach Gia Airport		

=== Codeshare agreements ===
Vietnam Air Services Company has codeshare agreements with the following airlines:

- Vietnam Airlines

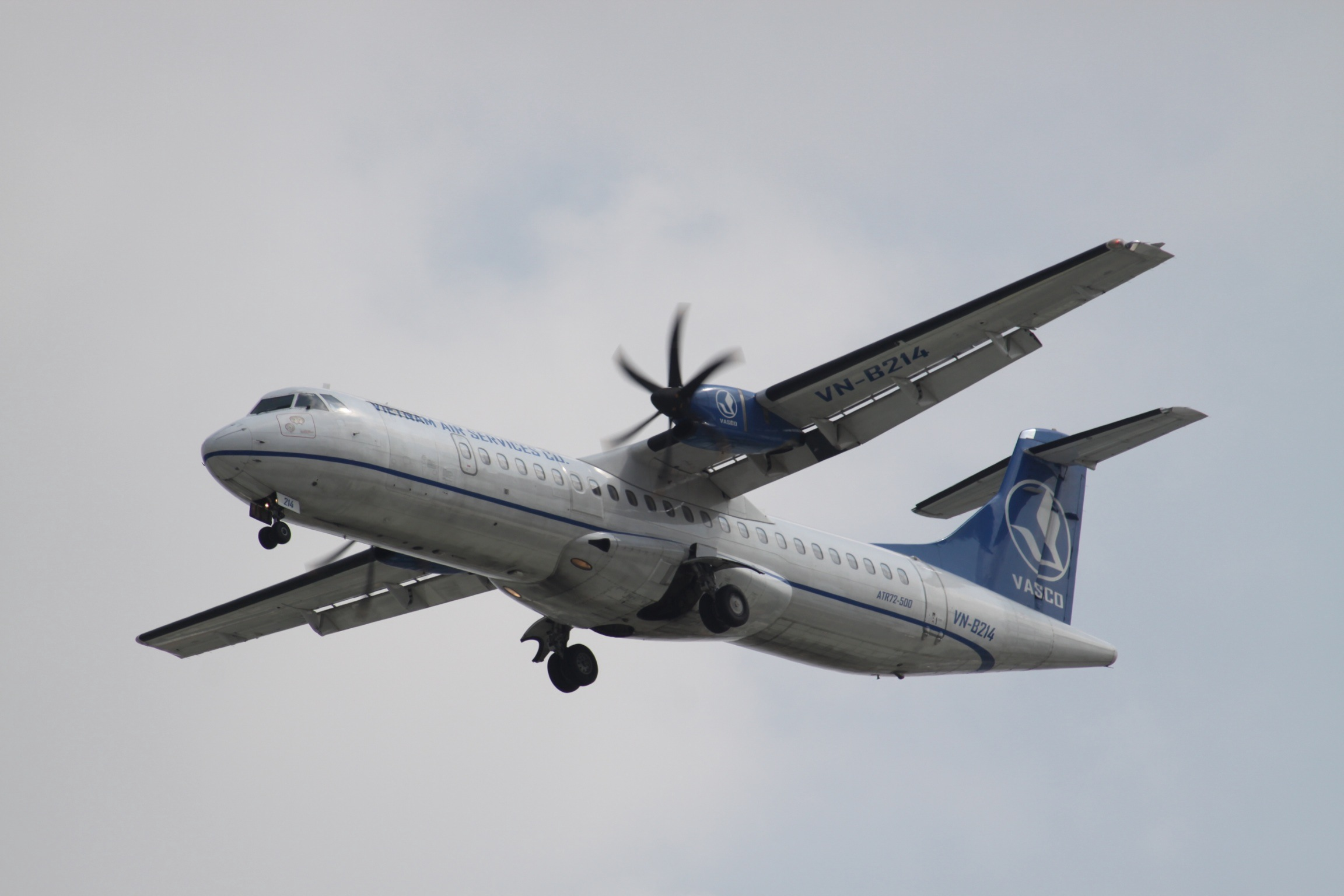
VASCO ATR 72-500 in 2012

== Fleet ==
=== Current fleet ===
As of April 2024, VASCO operates the following aircraft:

VASCO fleet
Aircraft	Total	Order	Passengers	Notes
ATR 72-500	5	—	68	Transferred from Vietnam Airlines.

== Restructuring and rebranding ==
In April 2016, Vietnam Airlines announced the establishment of the new VNĐ300 billion (US$13.4 million) airline in the previous month, based on the restructuring of its subsidiary, VASCO, to a new brand: SkyViet. However, in 2017, the plan was ultimately cancelled due to the requests from the stakeholders.

== See also ==
- Indochina Airlines
- Pacific Airlines
- Southern Service Flight Company
- Transport in Vietnam
- VietJet Air
