= Lien Khuong International Airport =

Airport in Lâm Đồng province, Vietnam

Lien Khuong International Airport Sân bay quốc tế Liên Khương Cảng hàng không quốc tế Liên Khương
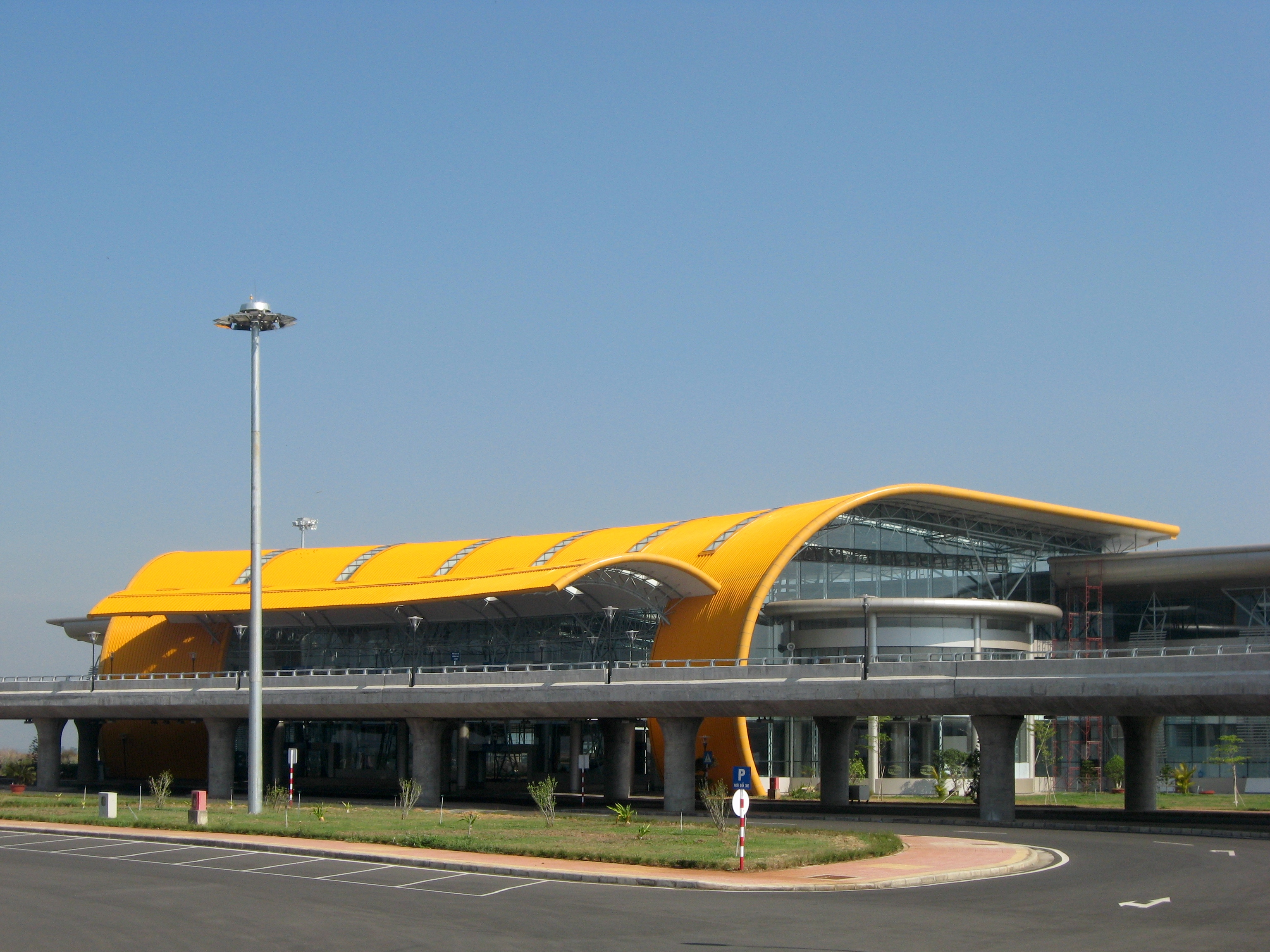
- IATA: DLI; ICAO: VVDL

Summary
- Airport type: Public
- Owner/Operator: Airports Corporation of Vietnam
- Serves: Da Lat
- Location: Đức Trọng, Lâm Đồng, Vietnam
- Elevation AMSL: 962 m (3,156 ft)
- Coordinates: 11°45′02″N 108°22′25″E

Map
- Location of airport in Vietnam

Runways
Direction	Length		Surface
Direction	m	ft	Surface
09/27	3,250	10,663	Asphalt

Statistics (2019)
- Passengers: 2,340,000

Lien Khuong International Airport (IATA: DLI, ICAO: VVDL) is an airport located in Đức Trọng commune, about 30 km (19 mi) south of Da Lat, Lâm Đồng province. It is the largest of four airports in the Central Highlands region of Vietnam. The major reconstruction in order to handle bigger aircraft was completed in December 2009. This airport handled 1,690,000 passengers in 2019, an increase of 18.3% against that of 2014.

== History ==
Lien Khuong International Airport (originally Lien Khang) was built by the French colonists in 1933 with a 700-meter-long soil runway.

From 1956 to 1960 the American army reconstructed and upgraded Lien Khuong Airport with rather completed facilities is not the infrastructure is quite complete. The terminal was designed in French architecture, with three stories. The terminal had a capacity of 50,000 passengers per year, or about 120 passengers/peak hour.

In 1957 there was a commercial flight five days a week from Saigon to Dalat, operated by Air Vietnam utilising a Douglas DC-3. The flight continued from Dalat to Banmethuot and then other cities before reversing its route. By 1962 the frequency had increased to two flights per day. By 1969 the DC-3 planes had been replaced by DC-4s and an additional flight per day was added to the schedule. By 1972 the frequency was reduced to one flight per day, utilising DC-3s and DC-4s.

During 1964–1972, the runway, apron, packing, and access roads went through improvement and reinforcement, the runway was refaced with asphalt from 8–10 cm in depth. As a result of this improvement, the runway was extended to 1,480 m long and 37 m wide, the apron was 23,100 square meters, the apron was 2,106 square meters, and the access road was 2,100 meters long. From the unification of Vietnam on 30 April 1975 until 1980, this airport was controlled and operated by the Vietnam People's Army. The airport mainly served high ranking governmental leaders on business and taking residents from northern Vietnam to Lâm Đồng in the so-called "New Economic Movement".

From 1981 to 1985 Lien Khuong Airport served civil service flights with Ho Chi Minh City - Lien Khuong route (one flight weekly) on Yak-40 aircraft, but all civil flights was suspended due to low passenger traffic.

Since 1992 Lien Khuong Airport resumed its civil services with Ho Chi Minh - Lien Khuong, and Huế – Lien Khuong on Yak-40, later replaced by ATR 72. The Huế – Lieng Khuong route was later suspended.

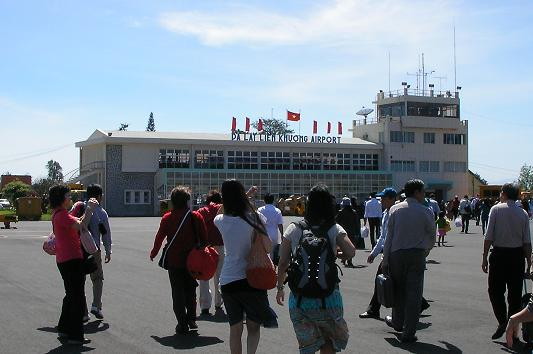
The old terminal

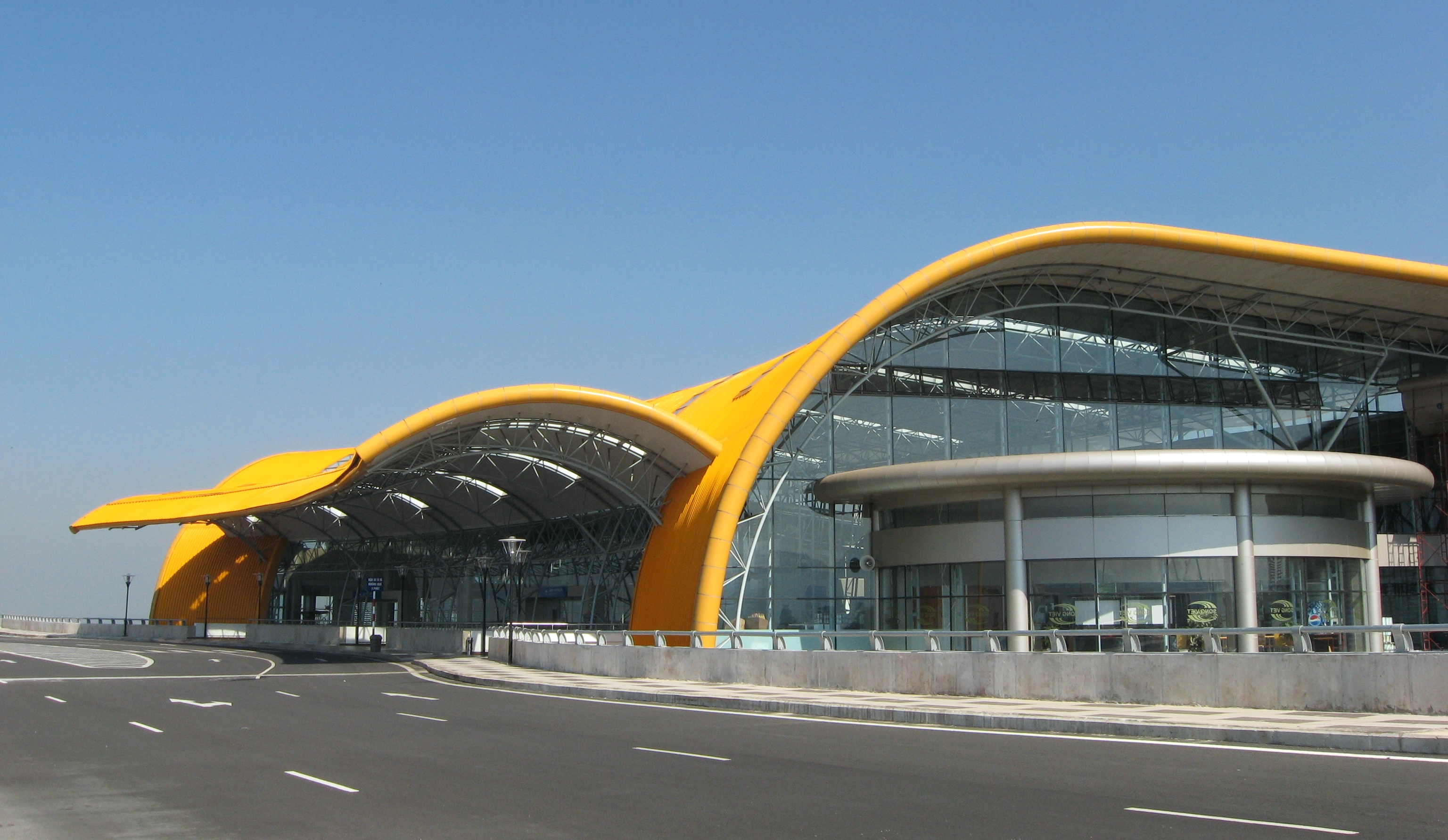
The new terminal

Since October 2004, this airport has served more air links with Hanoi's Noi Bai International Airport with Fokker 70 aircraft. As of December 2009, there were two daily flights to Ho Chi Minh City, and one flight daily to Hanoi.

On 4 March 2026, Lien Khuong Airport was temporarily ceased operations for all flights due to the construction of the runway extension project and upgrade facilities.

From 12:01 am on 19 August 2026, Lien Khuong Airport is officially resumed operation with resuming flight from Da Lat to Can Tho is operated by VASCO, a subsidiary of Vietnam Airlines.

== Military activity ==
Aeroflot Russia ran connection flights within Vietnam with Ilyushin Il-86 aircraft during 1981–89. It is suspected that the Soviet VVS Air Force carried out operations from Lien Khuong after the fall of Saigon in April 1975. Russia disbanded two of three defensive VVS interceptor squadrons consisting of Su-27, MiG-25, and 13 Yak-50 within Da lat in the summer of 1999. The fate of the retired aircraft is unknown. Possible transfer to People's Army of Vietnam PAVN and/or People's Air Defense Force of Vietnam PADFV to Hanoi.

== Services ==
The new 12,400-square-meter passenger terminal was inaugurated on December 26, 2009.

The new two-floor terminal was expected to enable the Lien Khuong Airport to serve international flights in the region in 2010.

The terminal is capable of receiving 1.5-2 million passengers per year.

== Airlines and destinations ==
Airlines	Destinations
AirAsia	Kuala Lumpur–International
Bamboo Airways	Can Tho, Da Nang, Hanoi, Vinh
Pacific Airlines	Hanoi, Ho Chi Minh City
VietJet Air	Can Tho, Da Nang, Hai Phong, Hanoi, Ho Chi Minh City, Thanh Hoa, Vinh
VASCO	Can Tho
Vietnam Airlines	Can Tho, Da Nang, Hai Phong, Hanoi, Ho Chi Minh City, Thanh Hoa, Vinh

If passengers would fly internationally from this airport, they would need to transit in Ho Chi Minh City to get to other international destinations.

== Statistics ==
Flights out of Lien Khuong Airport by frequency
Rank	Destinations	Frequency (weekly)
1	Hanoi	63
2	Ho Chi Minh City	56
3	Da Nang	7
4	Vinh	7
5	Hue	3
6	Hai Phong	6
7	Bangkok	7
8	Seoul-Incheon	6
9	Can Tho	4
10	Kuala Lumpur	4
11	Lanzhou	2

Year	Number of passengers
2008	
2009	
2010	
2011	
2012	
2013	
2014	675,995
2015	862,164
2016	1,300,000
2017	1,600,000
2018	1,750,000
2019	2,340,000

== Ground transport ==
A shuttle van to Da Lat is available for 40,000 dong; tickets are available near baggage collection, but seats quickly fill up. A taxi is around 250,000 dong (15 US dollars).

== Accidents and incidents ==
- On 29 December 1973, Douglas C-53D EM-3 of Air America overran the runway on landing. The aircraft was substantially damaged and was not salvaged due to the presence of land mines in the area. It was operating a non-scheduled passenger flight. All nine people on board survived.

== See also ==
- List of airports in Vietnam
