= Buon Ma Thuot Airport =

Domestic airport in Vietnam

Buon Ma Thuot Airport Sân bay Buôn Ma Thuột
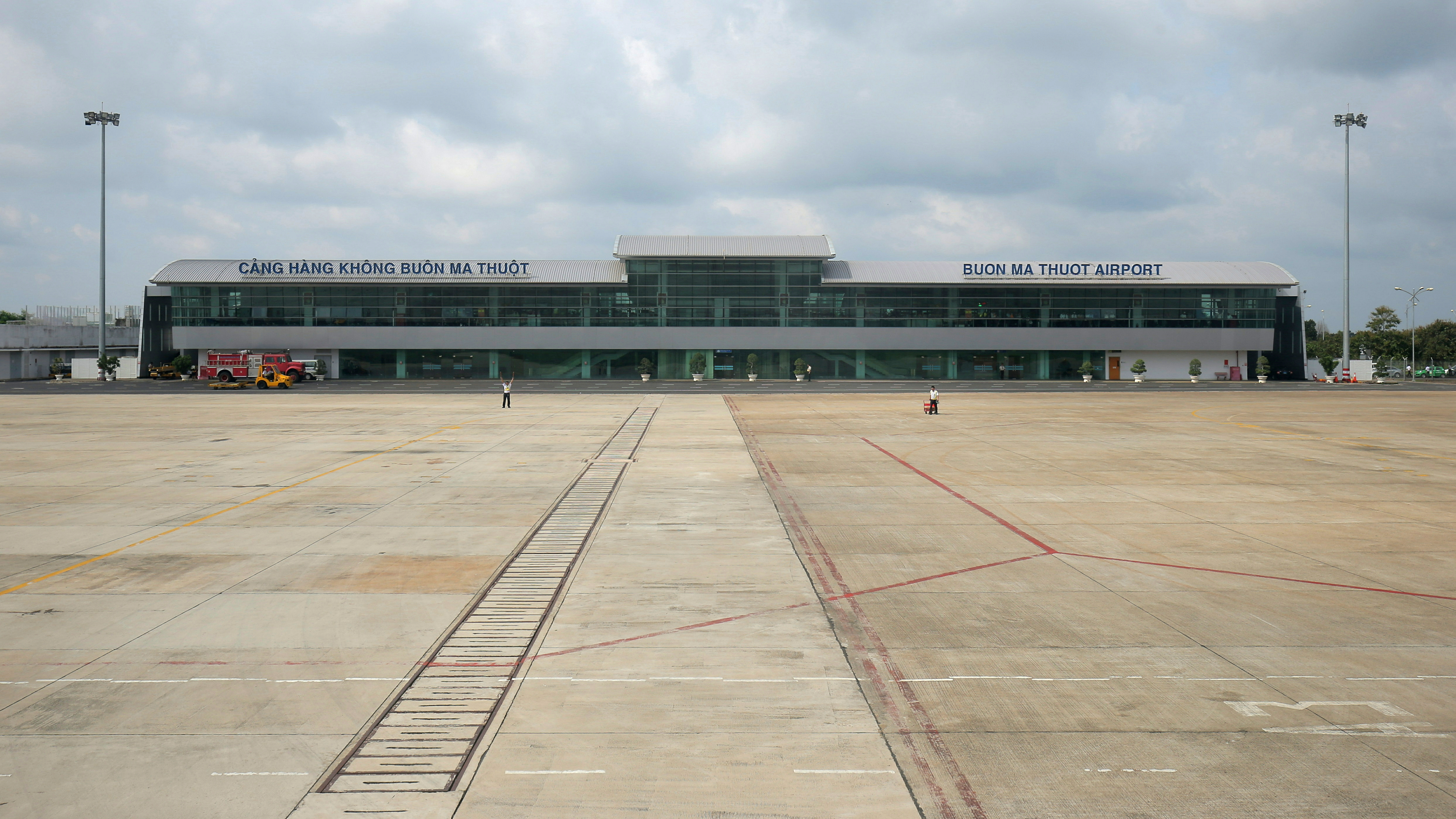
- IATA: BMV; ICAO: VVBM

Summary
- Airport type: Public
- Operator: Airports Corporation of Vietnam
- Serves: Buôn Ma Thuột
- Location: Tân Lập, Đắk Lắk, Vietnam
- Elevation AMSL: 1,736 ft (529 m)
- Coordinates: 12°40′05″N 108°07′12″E

Map
- Location of airport in Vietnam

Runways
Direction	Length		Surface
Direction	m	ft	Surface
09/27	3,000	9,843	Asphalt

Statistics (2015)
- Number of passengers: 860,000

Buon Ma Thuot Airport (IATA: BMV, ICAO: VVBM) is a public airport in Vietnam. The airport is located near the provincial capital Buon Ma Thuot in Đắk Lắk province. Another name for this airport is Phung-Duc Airport. It has one functional runway. A second incomplete runway (marked with a faded 27 R) is not in use. Two aprons are located on the south side of the airport with buildings that appeared to be used for aircraft storage. A barracks-like camp is located to the north side of the airport. This airport handled 860,000 passengers in 2016.

== Airlines and destinations ==
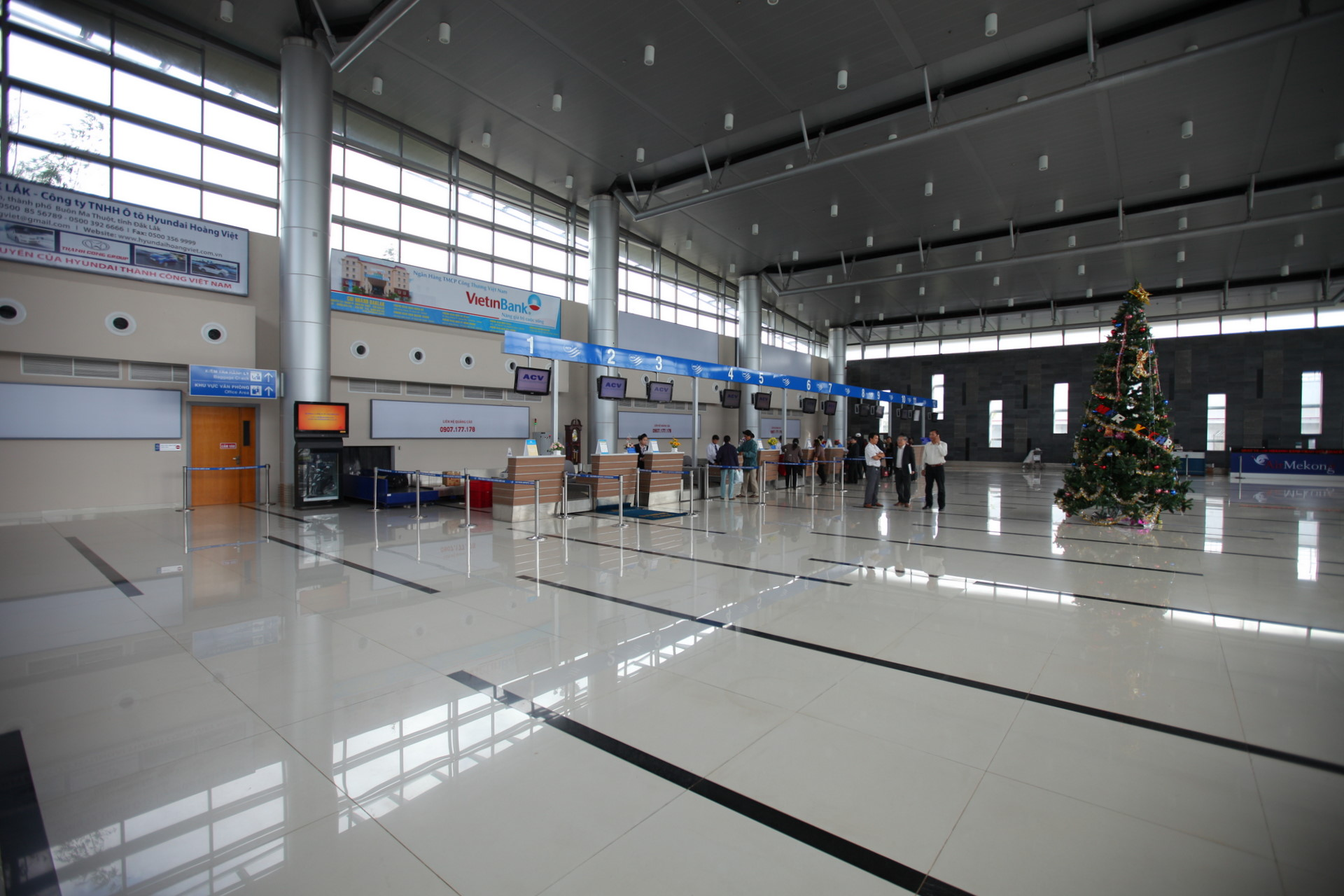
Inside the terminal

Airlines	Destinations
Bamboo Airways	Da Nang, Hai Phong, Hanoi, Vinh
Pacific Airlines	Da Nang, Ho Chi Minh City, Thanh Hoa
VietJet Air	Da Nang, Hai Phong, Hanoi, Ho Chi Minh City, Thanh Hoa, Vinh
Vietnam Airlines	Hai Phong, Hanoi, Ho Chi Minh City, Thanh Hoa, Vinh

The nearest international airport is Cam Ranh International Airport, which is located 226 km (140 mi) south east of Buon Ma Thuot Airport. The airport provides most domestic destinations to other parts of Vietnam as well as international routes to China, Kazakhstan, South Korea, Thailand, and Russia. However, if passengers would fly internationally from this airport, they would need to transit in either Hanoi or Ho Chi Minh City to get to other international destinations.

== See also ==
- List of airports in Vietnam
