= Can Tho International Airport =

Airport in Vietnam

Can Tho International Airport Cảng hàng không Quốc Tế Cần Thơ Sân bay Quốc tế Cần Thơ
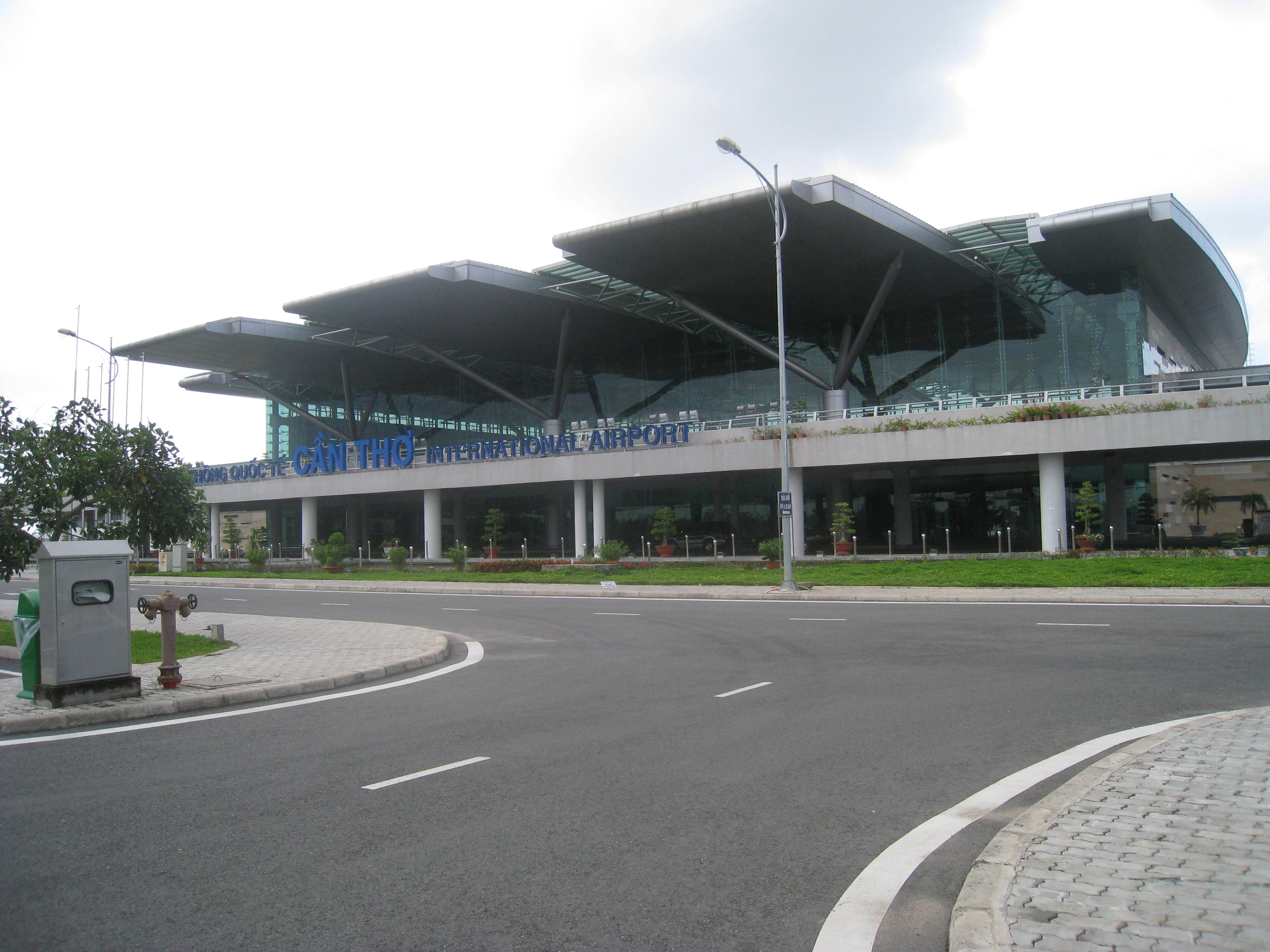
- IATA: VCA; ICAO: VVCT

Summary
- Airport type: Public
- Operator: Southern Airports Authority
- Serves: Can Tho and Mekong Delta
- Location: Thới An Đông, Can Tho, Vietnam
- Hub for: Vietnam Airlines
- Focus city for: Vietjet Air, Bamboo Airways, Sun PhuQuoc Airways, VASCO
- Elevation AMSL: 3 m (9.8 ft)
- Coordinates: 10°05′07″N 105°42′43″E

Map
- Location of airport in Vietnam

Runways
Direction	Length		Surface
Direction	m	ft	Surface
06/24	3,000	9,843	Asphalt

Statistics (2018)
- Passengers: 830,000

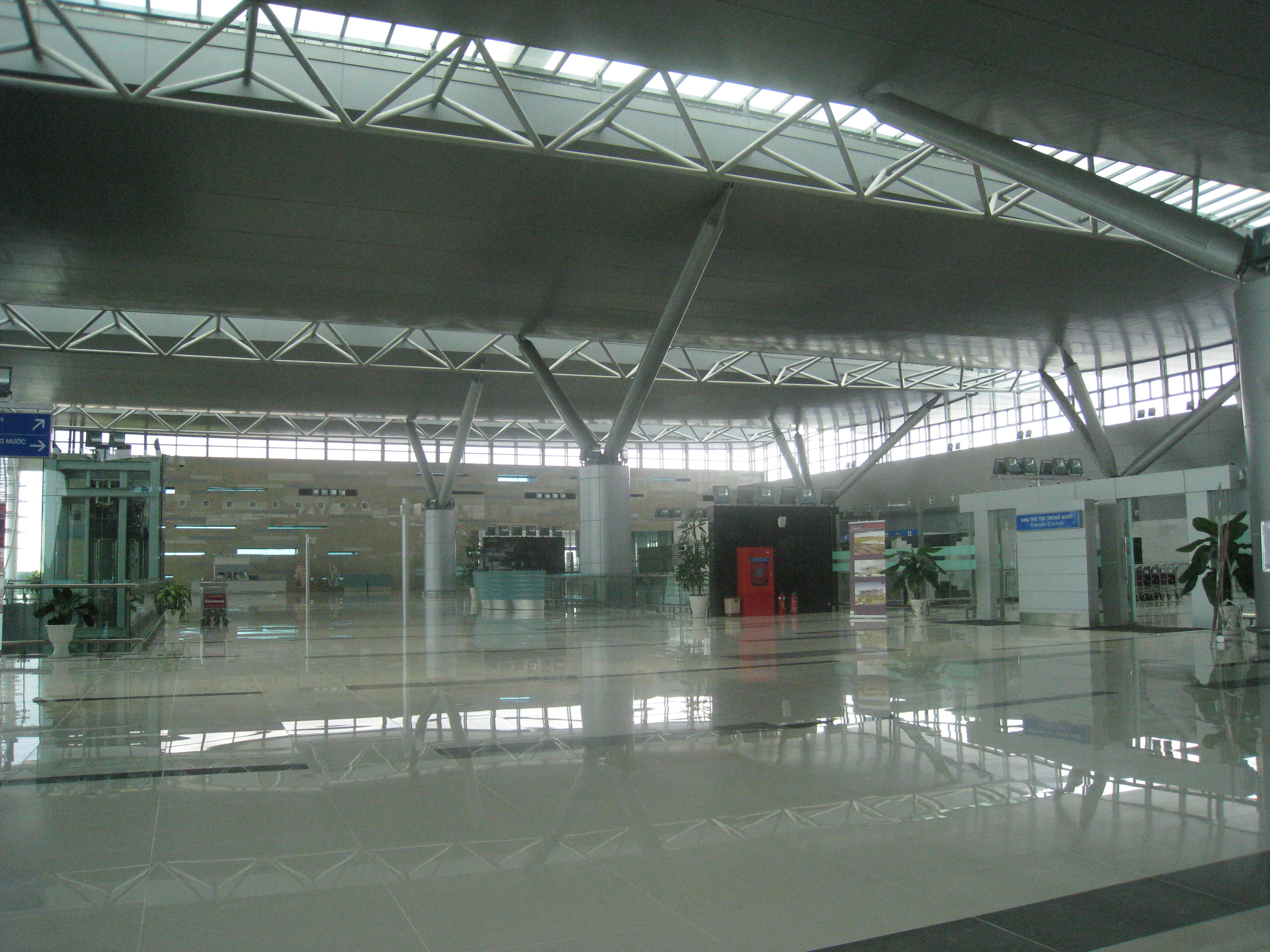
Inside the terminal of the Can Tho International Airport

Can Tho International Airport (IATA: VCA, ICAO: VVCT) — formerly Trà Nóc Airport — is an international airport located in Can Tho in Mekong Delta region of Vietnam.

The airport was inaugurated on 1 January 2011 and received US$150 million to build on 20,750 square metres (223,400 sq ft)(5.13 acres) of land. It aimed to be able to process up to 5 million passengers a year. It serves air travel in the region, boosting Mekong Delta's economy, improving defence, security and international integration.

== History ==
Trà Nóc Airport was originally constructed during the Vietnam War in 1965 by United States Air Force (USAF) civil engineering units as a military airfield, which became Binh Thuy Air Base. It was used by the USAF as well as being the Headquarters of the Republic of Vietnam Air Force (VNAF) 4th Air Division until 1975.

On 19 April 1969 the VAL-4 Light Attack Squadron began combat operations, flying air support for the Mobile Riverine Force in the Mekong Delta of South Vietnam. The missions included normal patrol, overhead air cover, scramble alert and gunfire/artillery spotting. On 31 March 1972 the squadron conducted its last combat mission prior to its disestablishment on 10 April 1972.

After 1975, the facility was initially unused, then later operated as a small regional airport for Can Tho. It was expanded and upgraded to international status, with completion due in 2008.

=== Upgrading of Trà Nóc airport ===
The expansion work of Trà Nóc airport started on 4 January 2006. The project was implemented in two phases, finishing on 1 January 2011.

=== Current status ===
The airport is operating at loss, serving only 20% of its designed capacity.

In 2017 the 917th Mixed Air Transport Regiment (a.k.a. Đồng Tháp Squadron) of 370th Air Force Division in the Vietnam People's Air Force was moved to Cần Thơ from Tan Son Nhut Air Base.

== Airlines and destinations ==
Airlines	Destinations
Bamboo Airways	Con Dao, Phu Quoc
VietJet Air	Da Nang, Ha Long, Hanoi, Vinh
VASCO	Da Lat
Vietnam Airlines	Hanoi, Phu Quoc

== See also ==
- List of airports in Vietnam
