= Con Dao Airport =

Airport in Vietnam

Côn Đảo Airport Sân bay Côn Đảo Cảng hàng không Côn Đảo
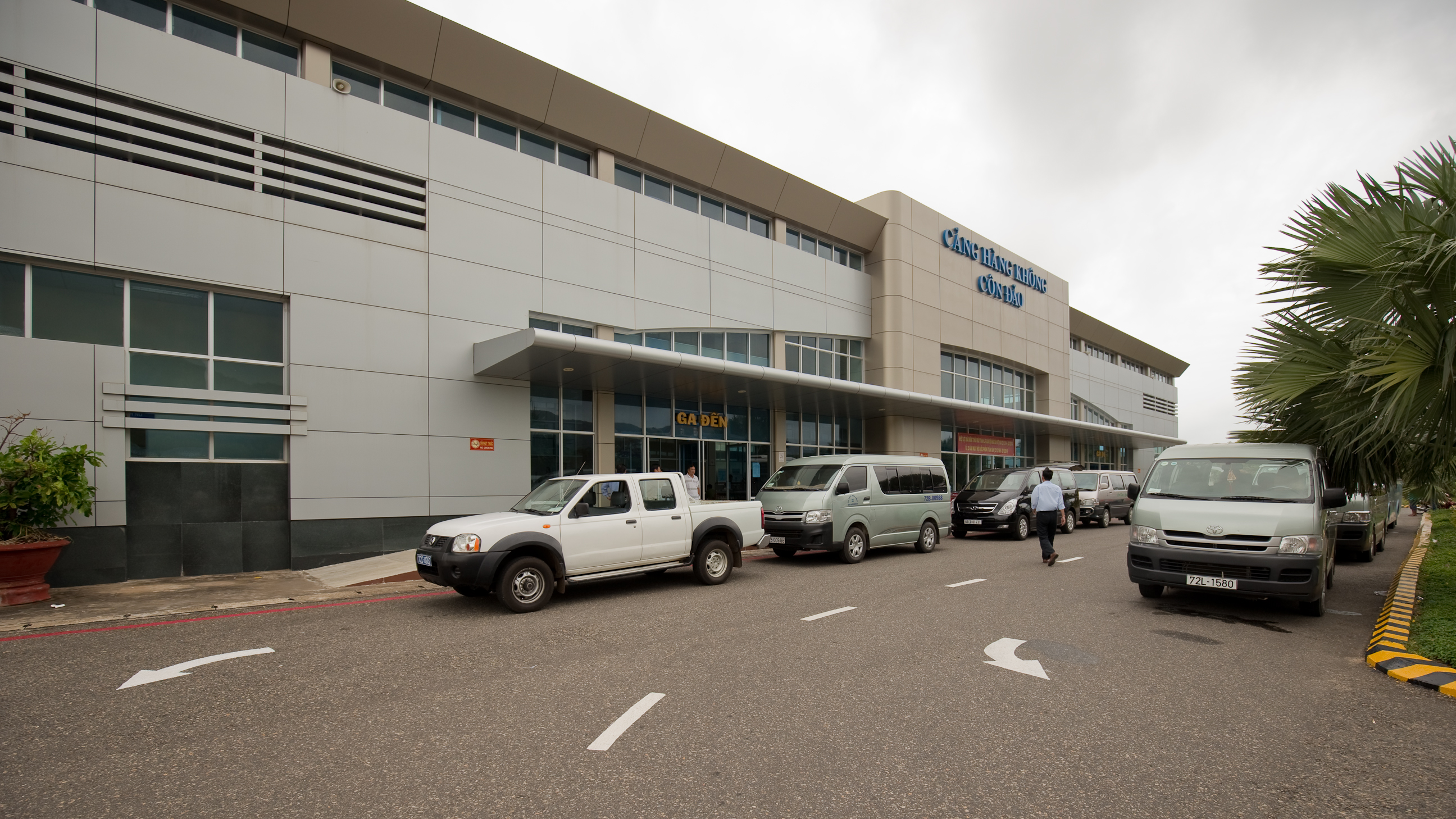
- Con Dao Airport
- IATA: VCS; ICAO: VVCS

Summary
- Airport type: Public
- Operator: Airports Corporation of Vietnam
- Serves: Côn Đảo
- Location: Côn Đảo, Ho Chi Minh City, Vietnam
- Elevation AMSL: 6 m / 20 ft
- Coordinates: 08°43′57″N 106°37′44″E

Map
- Location of airport in Vietnam

Runways
Direction	Length		Surface
Direction	m	ft	Surface
11/29	1,830	6,004	Asphalt

Côn Đảo Airport or Côn Sơn Airport (IATA: VCS, ICAO: VVCS) is located on Côn Sơn Island, the largest island of Côn Đảo archipelago off the coast of Ho Chi Minh City, Vietnam.

== Airlines and destinations ==
Airlines	Destinations
VietJet Air	Hanoi, Tan Son Nhat
Vietnam Airlines	Can Tho, Tan Son Nhat

If passengers would fly internationally from this airport, they would need to transit in Tan Son Nhat International Airport to get to other international destinations.

== Statistics ==
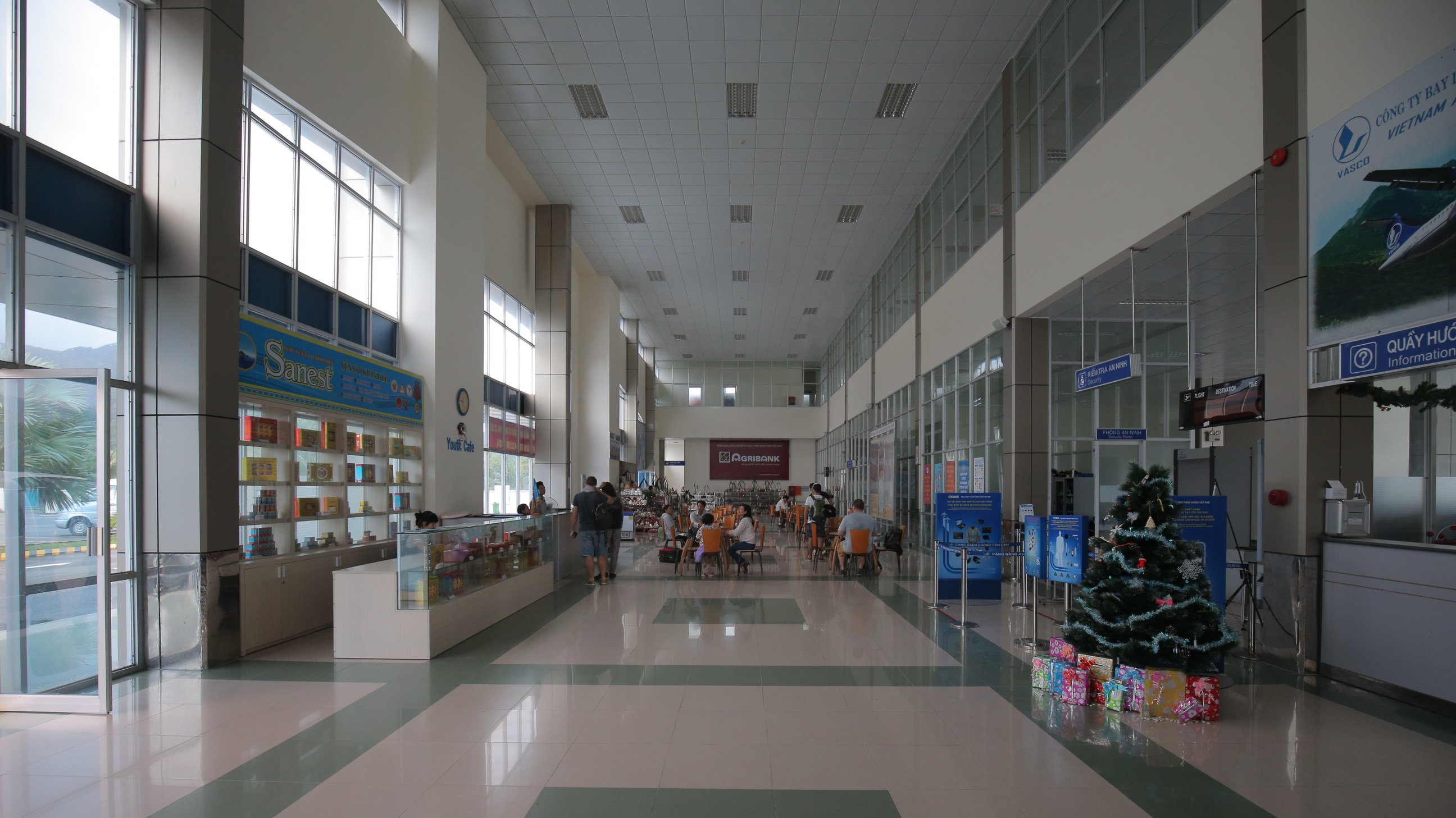
Côn Đảo Airport at Côn Sơn Island, the largest island of Côn Đảo archipelago, Vietnam

Flights out of Côn Đảo Airport by frequency
Rank	Destinations	Frequency (weekly)
1	Ho Chi Minh City	27
2	Ha Noi	6

== See also ==
- List of airports in Vietnam
