= List of Vietnamese people by net worth =

The following Forbes list of Vietnamese billionaires is based on an annual assessment of wealth and assets compiled and published by Forbes magazine in 2026.

== 2026 Vietnamese billionaires list ==
World Rank (2026)	Name	Citizenship	Residence	Net worth (USD)	Source of wealth	Company
93	Phạm Nhật Vượng	Vietnam	Hanoi	30 billion	real estate, retail, automotive, healthcare	Vingroup
1011	Nguyễn Thị Phương Thảo	Vietnam	Ho Chi Minh City	4.2 billion	airlines	Vietjet Air
1406	Phạm Thu Hương	Vietnam	Hanoi	3 billion	real estate, retail, automotive, healthcare	Vingroup
1440	Trần Đình Long	Vietnam	Hanoi	2.9 billion	steel	Hòa Phát
1676	Hồ Hùng Anh	Vietnam	Hanoi	2.5 billion	banking	Techcombank
1982	Phạm Thúy Hằng	Vietnam	Hanoi	2.1 billion	real estate, retail, automotive, healthcare	Vingroup
3017	Ngô Chí Dũng	Vietnam	Hanoi	1.2 billion	banking	VPBank
3017	Nguyễn Đăng Quang	Vietnam	Ho Chi Minh City	1.2 billion	consumer products, banking	Masan Group

== See also ==
- The World's Billionaires
- List of countries by the number of billionaires
