= Bùi Thành Nhơn =

Vietnamese businessman

- Born: 1958 (age 67–68); Đồng Tháp, Vietnam
- Citizenship: Vietnam
- Occupation: Property developer
- Organisation: Novaland

Bùi Thành Nhơn (born 1958) is a Vietnamese businessman and property developer billionaire. In 2016, he was listed as the 4th richest man in Vietnam, after Phạm Nhật Vượng, Trịnh Văn Quyết and Trần Đình Long.

He is currently the Chairman of Novaland Group.

== Biography ==
Bùi Thành Nhơn was born in 1958 in Long Khánh A commune, Hồng Ngự district, Đồng Tháp.

He holds a bachelor's degree in veterinary medicine, and a bachelor's degree in advanced business administration (from HSB Tuck School of Business in Dartmouth, Hanover, Germany).

== Career ==
From 1981 to 1983, Nhơn worked at the Agriculture Department of the People's Committee of Nhà Bè District, Ho Chi Minh City.

From 1983 to 1992, he worked at Level I Animal Husbandry and Veterinary Materials Company, Ho Chi Minh City.

In 1992, he founded Thành Nhơn Trading Company Limited. At that time, the company's main activities included selling veterinary drugs, pharmaceutical materials, and chemicals.

In 2007, Thành Nhơn Trading Company Limited was restructured into two units: Anova Joint Stock Company and No Va Real Estate Investment Group Joint Stock Company (Novaland). Novaland operates mainly in the real estate industry. Nhơn has been the Chairman of Novaland since then.

On December 28, 2016, Novaland was officially listed on Vietnam's stock market – with the stock code "NVL" on Ho Chi Minh Stock Exchange (HOSE). At that time, Novaland's equity was VND29,500 billion (about $1.3 billion), making it the 2nd largest real estate company, just behind Vingroup. That same year, Nhơn was recognized by Vietnamnet as the 4th richest person in Vietnam, after Phạm Nhật Vượng, Trịnh Văn Quyết and Trần Đình Long.

== Personal life ==
Nhơn is married to Cao Thị Ngọc Sương.

The couple have two children, one of whom is Bùi Cao Nhật Quân.

== See also ==
- Phạm Nhật Vượng
