= Novaland Group =

Vietnamese real estate developer

- Native name: Tập đoàn Đầu tư Địa ốc No Va
- Formerly: Thành Nhơn Trading Company Limited
- Type: Public
- Traded as: NVL
- Industry: Real estate
- Founded: 2007
- Founder: Bùi Thành Nhơn
- Headquarters: Ho Chi Minh City; Vietnam
- Area served: Vietnam
- Key people: Bùi Thành Nhơn, Chairman
- Products: Real estate development
- Services: Property development, investment
- Website: www.novaland.com.vn

Novaland Group or Novaland, formally the Novaland Investment Group Corporation, is a real estate developer in Vietnam. It was founded by entrepreneur Bùi Thành Nhơn.

== History ==
Nhơn established Thành Nhơn Trading Company Limited with a charter capital of 400 million VND. Initially, the company sold veterinary drugs, pharmaceuticals and chemicals. In 2007, it was restructured into two units - Anova Joint Stock Company and No Va Real Estate Investment Group Joint Stock Company (Novaland).

On December 28, 2016, Novaland was officially listed on Vietnam's stock market - with stock code "NVL" on Ho Chi Minh Stock Exchange (HOSE). At this time, its market capitalization was VND29,500 billion (about $1.3 billion).

Novaland was alleged to have a connection with Phan Văn Anh Vũ (aka Vũ “nhôm”) – a Vietnamese businessman who was accused of having abused his authority and worked with various Vietnamese real estate developers to appropriate “tons of money”.

== Controversies ==
In 2007-2009, the People's Committee of Ho Chi Minh City ordered to take 30.1 hectares of resettlement land for people in Thủ Thiêm New Urban Area to exchange for 30.2 hectares of land in Bình Khánh and Bình Trưng Tây ward, District 2 - which 21st Century International Development Joint Stock Company (a subsidiary of Novaland) owned.

Then, in July 2017, this 30.2-hectare area was again assigned to 21st Century International Development Joint Stock Company for a real estate project.

In September 2018, the Government Inspectorate issued a notice of inspection, which concluded that the People's Committee of the City had approved the use of this area for wrong purposes. After that, the People's Committee of the City again approved the use of this resettlement area for housing and business - without conducting an auction as regulated.

In November 2020, an article on ThuongTruong24h.vn reported that Novaland had not finished issuing house ownership certificates in 11 real estate projects.

In January 2021, Ho Chi Minh City Inspectorate was reported to have discovered many wrongdoings of the Tân An Huy Residential Area project's investors, including those related to Phú Mỹ Hưng Co. Ltd and Novaland Group.

== See also ==
- Vingroup
- Sun Group (Vietnam)
- Phu My Hung Corporation
