= Lê Viết Lam =

Vietnamese businessman

- Born: 1969 (age 56–57); Thanh Hóa, Vietnam
- Citizenship: Vietnam
- Occupation: Property developer
- Organisation: Sun Group Vietnam

Lê Viết Lam (born 1969) is a Vietnamese businessman, entrepreneur, and property developer. He is the founder of Sun Group Vietnam.

== Biography ==
Lê Viết Lam was born in 1969 in Hoằng Quang commune, Hoằng Hóa district, Thanh Hóa province.

In 1987, after studying for a year at the Faculty of Textile Energy Engineering at Hanoi University of Science and Technology, he was sent to Russia to study and obtained a master's degree in 1992.

In 1993, he and Phạm Nhật Vượng, together with a group of young people, established the Barabarosha market.

Later, Lam and Vượng founded Technocom company. Initially, the company sold instant noodles under the brand name Mivina. Technocom then became a market leader in dehydrated culinary products in Ukraine, before being sold to Nestlé in 2009.

While Vượng remained with Technocom for a while before returning to Vietnam to found Vingroup, Lam and a few partners soon left the company to establish Sun Group in 2007.

== See also ==
- Phạm Nhật Vượng
