= Van Don International Airport =

Airport serving Ha Long, Vietnam

Van Don International Airport Cảng hàng không quốc tế Vân Đồn

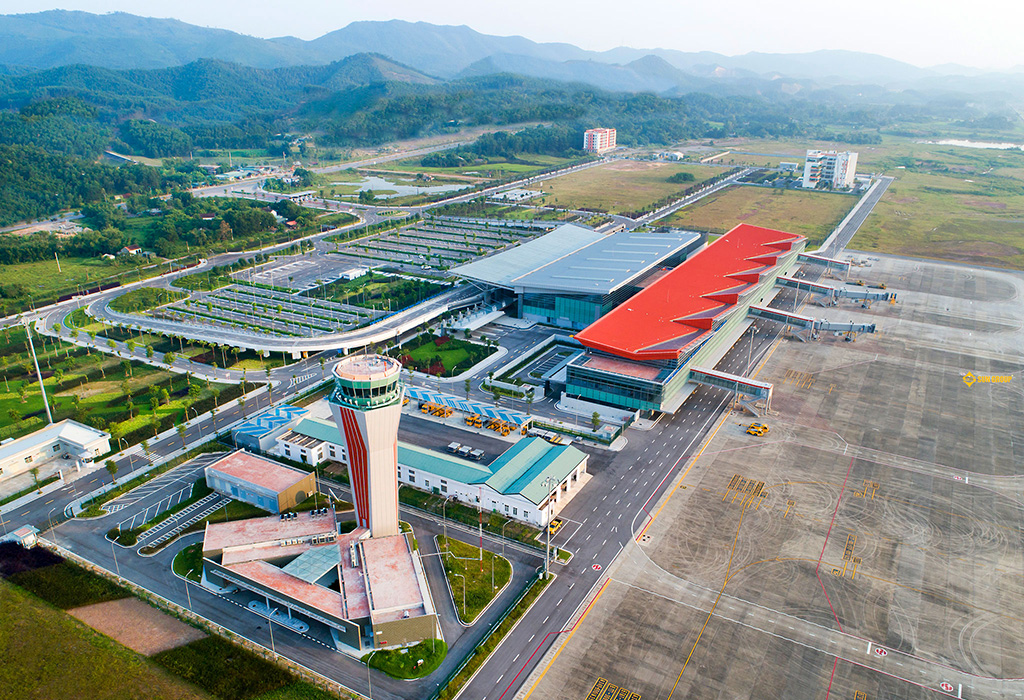
- IATA: VDO; ICAO: VVVD

Summary
- Airport type: Public
- Owner: Sun Group
- Operator: Van Don Investment and Development JSC; Northern Airports Authority
- Serves: Hạ Long
- Location: Vân Đồn, Quảng Ninh, Vietnam
- Hub for: Sun PhuQuoc (nominal HQ); Vietnam Airlines
- Operating base for: Bamboo Airways; VietJet Air; Vietravel Airlines; Sun Air
- Coordinates: 21°07′04″N 107°24′51″E
- Website: www.vandonairport.vn

Map
- Location of airport in Vietnam

Runways
| Direction | Length | | Surface |
| Direction | m | ft | Surface |
|---|---|---|---|
| 03/21 | 3,600 | 11,811 | Concrete |

Statistics (2019)
- Total passengers: 260,434
- Source: Taseco Airs

Van Don International Airport (IATA: VDO, ICAO: VVVD) is an airport in Vân Đồn special administrative region, Quảng Ninh, Vietnam. It is located about 50 km (31 mi) away from Hạ Long ward and 20 km (12 mi) from Cẩm Phả. It is the first private airport in Vietnam, built and operated by Sun Group, and is now serving as the nominal operating base for its parent's Sun PhuQuoc Airways.

== Background ==
According to Decision No. 1296/QD-TTg approving the Prime Minister's Plan of 19/07/2009; Decision No. 21/QD-TTg approving the Transport Ministerial Decision 2020-2030 of 08/01/2009 and Decision 576/QD-BGTVT approving the planning of an airport in Quang Ninh of 16/03/2012, Van Don airport was built with standard grade 4E, military airfield level II; acting as a domestic airport and receiver of international flights; with shared civil and military use.

According to the announcement of Prime Minister Nguyen Xuan Phuc at the meeting with the leaders of Quang Ninh province in early February 2014, the adjustment of the planning of Quang Ninh airport into an international airport was approved. The Ministry of Transport is assigned to complete the planning adjustment procedures and submit them to the Prime Minister for approval; Quang Ninh People's Committee soon accelerated investment and put Van Don International Airport into operation.

Vân Đồn is the first airport in Vietnam to be developed under a build–operate–transfer format with its payback period expected to last for 45 years. Construction on the airport commenced in 2015. The 3-phase project has an estimated total budget of 7.5 trillion VND (US$330 million). Upon completion of all three phases in 2030, the airport will be capable of handling 5 million passengers per year.

On July 11, 2018, a King Air 350 from Noi Bai International Airport landed in Van Don for a calibration flight, marking it the first flight that the airport received.

On December 30, 2018, the airport officially opened for operations, with a flight from Hanoi by Vietnam Airlines. Prime Minister Nguyễn Xuân Phúc was present on the flight and pressed the button to formally open the airport for airline operations.

Since the start of the COVID-19 pandemic in Vietnam, Van Don International Airport has been serving as a designated airport for repatriation flights of Vietnamese citizens from abroad in the North, alongside Phu Cat in the Central region and Can Tho in the South. Notable flights include from Wuhan, China, Kyiv, Ukraine, Toronto, Canada and San Francisco, United States. The flight to San Francisco is considered to be the first flight from a Vietnamese carrier to the United States. Airlines participating in the repatriation flights include Vietnam Airlines, Bamboo Airways and VietJet Air. Normal passenger flights resumed from May 4, 2020.

== Facilities and infrastructure ==
Located on the coast of Quảng Ninh, Van Don International Airport covers an area of 325 ha (800 acres) and contains one single runway:

- Runway 03/21: 3,600 m × 45 m (11,811 ft × 148 ft) with a 300 m x 300 m (984.3 ft x 984.3 ft) runway safety area

Runway 03/21 is certified for Cat II Instrument Landing operations. The airport has 7 aircraft parking stands and an air traffic control tower 42 m (138 ft) tall.

=== Passenger Terminal ===
Van Don is building one passenger terminal capable of handling 2.5 million passengers and 10,000 cargo tons per year The terminal has an area of almost 27,000 m^{2} (290,000 sq ft). It is equipped with 4 jet bridges (1 Code E and 3 Code C), 4 baggage carousels, 8 security gates and 31 check-in counters.

== Airlines and destinations ==
=== Passenger ===
| Airlines | Destinations |
|---|---|
| Sun PhuQuoc Airways | Ho Chi Minh City |

The airport doesn't provide direct flights to Hanoi's Noi Bai International Airport, passengers will have to either take a shuttle bus, train or private car to get to Noi Bai International Airport.

== Ground transport ==
The Ninh Binh–Haiphong–Quang Ninh Expressway connects the airport to Hạ Long. It was built at a cost of over US$500 million, and went into operation in December 2018; the Haiphong–Quang Ninh section was split off to the Haiphong–Ha Long–Van Don–Mong Cai Expressway by 2021.
