= Trần Đình Long =

Vietnamese billionaire

- Born: 22 February 1961 (age 65); Hải Dương, Vietnam
- Citizenship: Vietnam
- Occupations: Businessman, entrepreneur
- Organisation: Hòa Phát
- Known for: Vietnamese billionaire, chairman of Hòa Phát
- Spouse: Vũ Thị Hiền
- Children: 2

Trần Đình Long (born 22 February 1961) is a Vietnamese businessman and billionaire. He is the chair of Hoa Phat Group Joint Stock Company (HPG). He is considered among the most successful businessmen in Vietnam's steel industry.

== Early life and education ==
Trần Đình Long was born on 22 February 1961. He was born and raised in Hải Dương. He currently resides in Hai Bà Trưng District, Hanoi.

Long graduated from Vietnam's National Economics University with a bachelor's degree in economics in 1986.

== Career ==
Long became the Chairman of Hòa Phát group in 1996.

In March 2019, Long was listed in the real-time list of billionaires by Forbes magazine – with a fortune of 1 billion USD, making him the 1756th richest man in the world at that time.

In 2021, he was listed in Forbes' list of billionaires as the 1444th richest man in the world, and the 3rd richest man in Vietnam – after Phạm Nhật Vượng and Nguyễn Thị Phương Thảo.

== Personal life ==
Long has a wife named Vũ Thị Hiền. The couple has two children, Trần Vũ Minh and Trần Huyền Linh.

== See also ==
- Trần Bá Dương
- Nguyễn Đăng Quang
