= Sun PhuQuoc Airways =

Airline of Vietnam

- SPA Airbus A321neo
IATA	ICAO	Call sign
9G	SPQ	SUN LUX
- Founded: 21 January 2025; 22 months ago
- Commenced operations: 15 October 2025; 13 months ago
- AOC #: 2025-669/CAAV
- Operating bases: Van Don
- Hubs: Phu Quoc; HCMC Tan Son Nhat; Hanoi Noi Bai
- Frequent-flyer program: Sun Signature
- Fleet size: 21
- Destinations: 15
- Parent company: Sun Group
- Headquarters: Hanoi
- Key people: Lê Viết Lam (Chairman); Nguyễn Mạnh Quân (CEO)
- Total assets: ▲US$ 98.81 million (2025)
- Website: sunphuquocairways.com

Sun PhuQuoc Airways LLC (SPA; Vietnamese: Công ty TNHH Hàng Không Mặt Trời Phú Quốc) is a Vietnamese leisure-focused full-service carrier founded by Sun Group. The airline received its air operator's certificate in September 2025 and commenced official commercial operations from November 2025.

== History ==
On 21 January 2025, Vietnamese conglomerate Sun Group founded Sun PhuQuoc Airways (SPA/SPQ) as a leisure carrier. On 25 September 2025, the airline got its Air Operators Certificate (AOC) and was cleared to launch ticket sales on 15 October 2025.

On 1 November 2025, Sun PhuQuoc Airways was cleared to commence commercial operations.

On 15 January 2026, Sun Group announced that SPA will start flying internationally starting March 29 to Taipei, Seoul, and more.

On 16 February 2026, the airline received two A320neos from defunct Icelandic carrier Play Airlines.

On 17 February 2026, Sun Group announced that SPA will start charters to Mumbai and Vijayawada.

On 18 February 2026, Sun PhuQuoc Airways signed a deal with Boeing for 20 787 Dreamliners and options for up to 40 airframes totally. As of April 2026, airline will also take delivery of used Airbus A330s formerly operated by American Airlines.

== Destinations ==
From November 1 until the end of 2025, Sun PhuQuoc Airways operated routes from Phú Quốc to Ho Chi Minh City, Hanoi, and Da Nang; as well as Hanoi–Ho Chi Minh City and Ho Chi Minh City–Da Nang.

Official ticket sales began on 15 October 2025, for flights connecting popular tourist destinations such as Phú Quốc, Ho Chi Minh City, Hanoi, and Da Nang.

On 15 January 2026, Sun PhuQuoc Airways launched its first international direct flight to Taipei starting on the 29th of March.

As of July 2026, Sun PhuQuoc Airways operates or has operated to the following destinations:

Country or region	City	Airport	Notes	Refs
China	Chengdu	Chengdu Tianfu International Airport		
China	Shanghai	Shanghai Pudong International Airport		
India	Ahmedabad	Sardar Vallabhbhai Patel International Airport	Begins 2 December 2026	
India	Mumbai	Chhatrapati Shivaji Maharaj International Airport	Terminated	
Hong Kong	Hong Kong	Hong Kong International Airport		
Malaysia	Kuala Lumpur	Kuala Lumpur International Airport		
Kazakhstan	Almaty	Almaty International Airport	Seasonal charter	
Kazakhstan	Astana	Nursultan Nazarbayev International Airport		
Russia	Moscow	Sheremetyevo International Airport	Begins 13 November 2026	
Singapore	Singapore	Changi Airport		
South Korea	Seoul	Incheon International Airport		
Taiwan	Taipei	Taoyuan International Airport		
Thailand	Bangkok	Suvarnabhumi Airport		
Vietnam	Da Nang	Da Nang International Airport	Focus city	
Vietnam	Hanoi	Noi Bai International Airport	Hub	
Vietnam	Haiphong	Cat Bi International Airport		
Vietnam	Ho Chi Minh City	Tan Son Nhat International Airport	Hub	
Vietnam	Nha Trang	Cam Ranh International Airport		
Vietnam	Phu Quoc	Phu Quoc International Airport	Focus city	
Vietnam	Quang Ninh	Van Don International Airport	Focus city	
Vietnam	Quang Tri	Dong Hoi Airport		

== Fleet ==
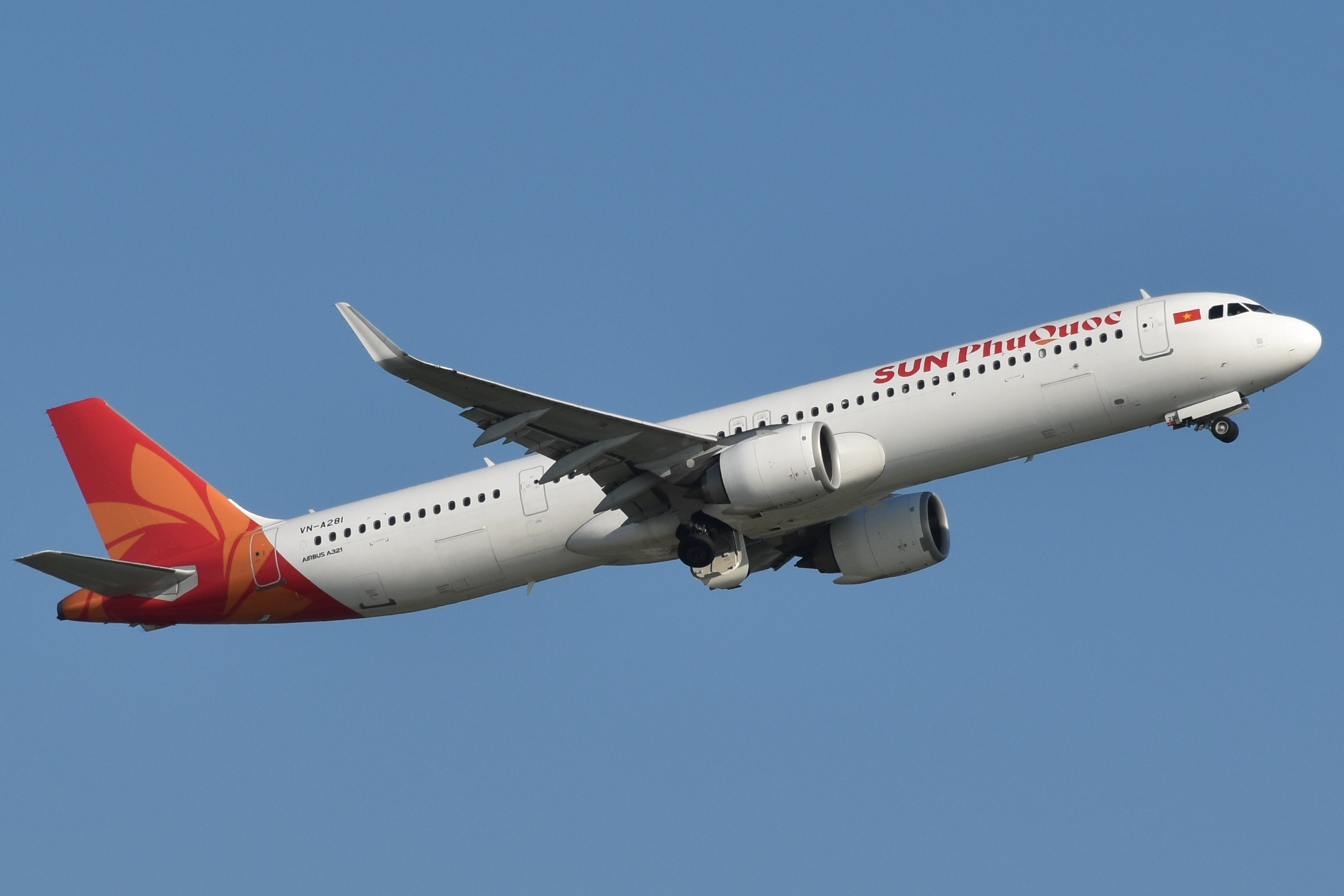
A Sun PhuQuoc A321neo flying under the carrier's original livery in 2026.

On 19 August, SPA simultaneously welcomed its first two Airbus A321ceo aircraft at Nội Bài International Airport in Hanoi, just more than a week after the first A321neo.

As of September 2026, Sun PhuQuoc Airways operates the following aircraft:

Sun PhuQuoc Airways fleet
Aircraft	In service	Orders	Passenger				Notes
Aircraft	In service	Orders	C	W	Y	Total	Notes
Airbus A320-200	—	4	—	—	180	180	
Airbus A320neo	4	12	—	—	174	174	
Airbus A320neo	4	12	—	—	186	186	
Airbus A321-200	2	—	8	—	212	220	
Airbus A321neo	12	22	—	—	236	236	6 leased from Qatar Airways.
Airbus A321neo	12	22	8	—	204	212	6 leased from Qatar Airways.
Airbus A321neo	12	22	8	—	200	208	6 leased from Qatar Airways.
Airbus A321LR	2	–	—	—	236	236	
Airbus A330-200	1	7	20	21	206	247	Acquired former American Airlines aircraft. Deliveries from 2026 to 2027.
Boeing 787-9	—	20	TBA				With options for up to 40.
Total	21	65					

== See also ==
- List of airlines of Vietnam
