= Sun Group (Vietnam) =

Large Vietnamese real estate developer

Sun Group Corporation
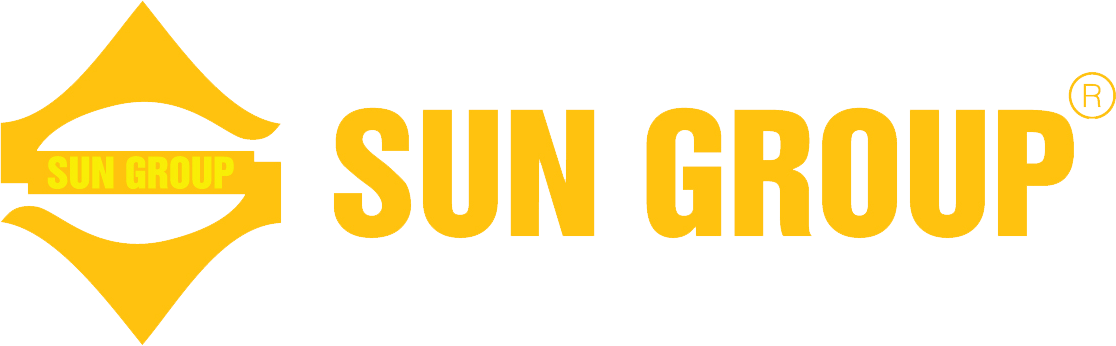
- Trade name: Sun Group
- Native name: Công ty cổ phần Tập đoàn Mặt trời
- Type: Conglomerate
- Industry: Real estate, tourism
- Founded: 2007 in Vietnam
- Founder: Lê Viết Lam
- Headquarters: Da Nang, Vietnam
- Area served: Vietnam, Ukraine
- Key people: Lê Viết Lam (Chairman)
- Number of employees: 4,000 (2015)
- Subsidiaries: Sun PhuQuoc Airways
- Website: https://sungroup.com.vn/

Sun Group Corp (Vietnamese: CTCP Tập đoàn Mặt trời, lit. 'Sun Group JSC') is a major services and real estate developers in Vietnam. Its main activities are the development of holiday resorts, attraction parks and luxury real estate.

Sun Group was founded in 2007 by four Vietnamese who lived in the former Soviet Union. One of them being Lê Viết Lam, who was a business partner of Vingroup's founder – Phạm Nhật Vượng – in the Technocom instant noodle business they set up in Kharkiv, Ukraine. After establishing a supermarket, hotel and water park in Kharkiv, in 2007, Lam went back to Vietnam to build Sun Group's first Vietnamese theme park, Ba Na Hills.

On 21 January 2025, leisure airline Sun PhuQuoc Airways was founded and on 1 November 2025 was cleared to commence commercial operations.

== Sun World ==
Sun World is the entertainment brand of Sun Group and includes 7 different entertainment destinations:

- Sun World Ba Na Hills
- Asia Park
- Sun World Fansipan Legend
  - Fansipan Funiculars and Cable Car
- Sun World Halong Complex
- Sun World Hon Thom Nature Park
  - Aquatopia Water Park
  - Exotica Village
  - Kiss The Stars Show
- Sun World BaDen Mountain
- Sun World CatBa Cable Car

== Notable projects ==
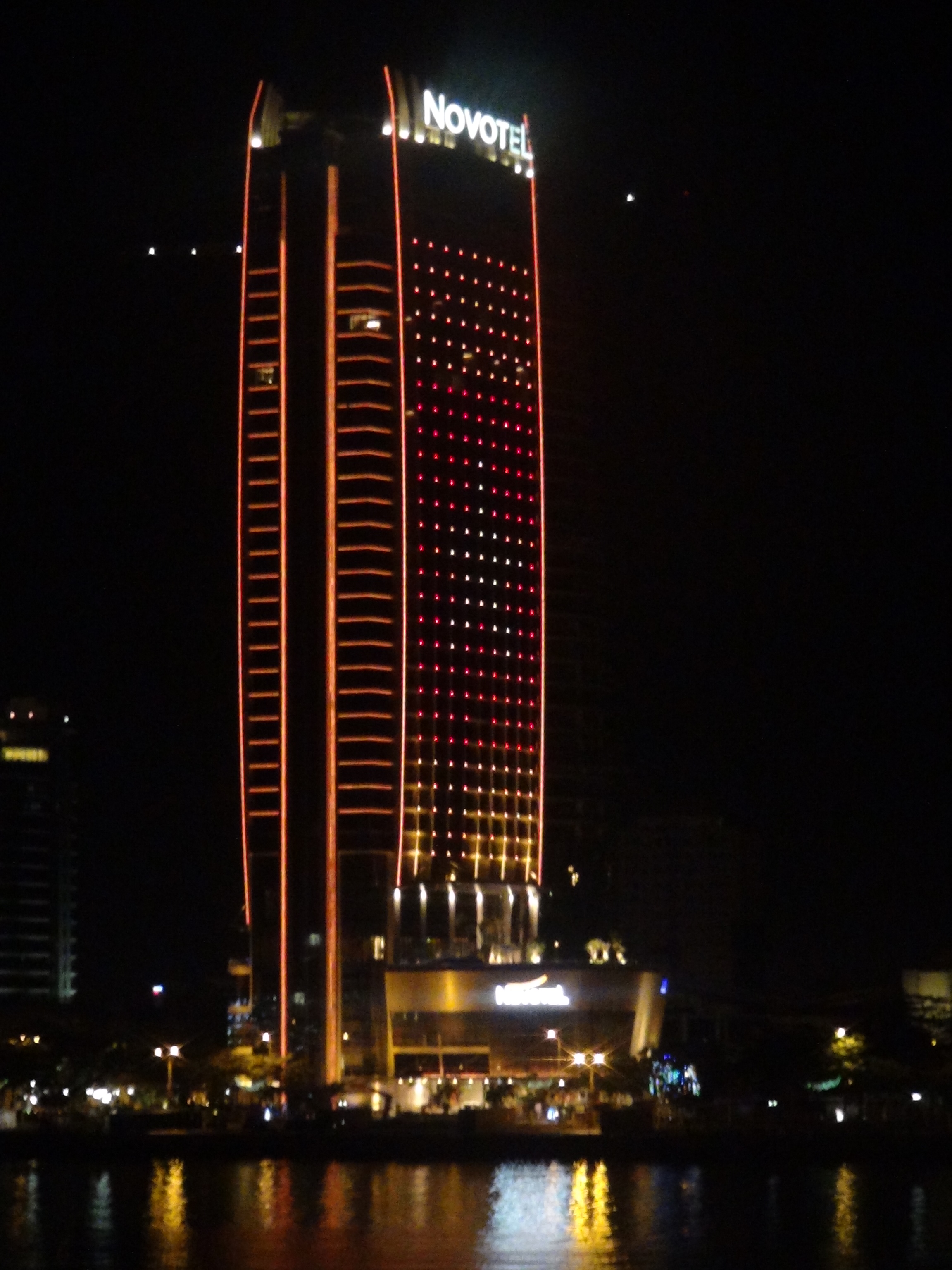
Novotel Danang, landmark building in Danang

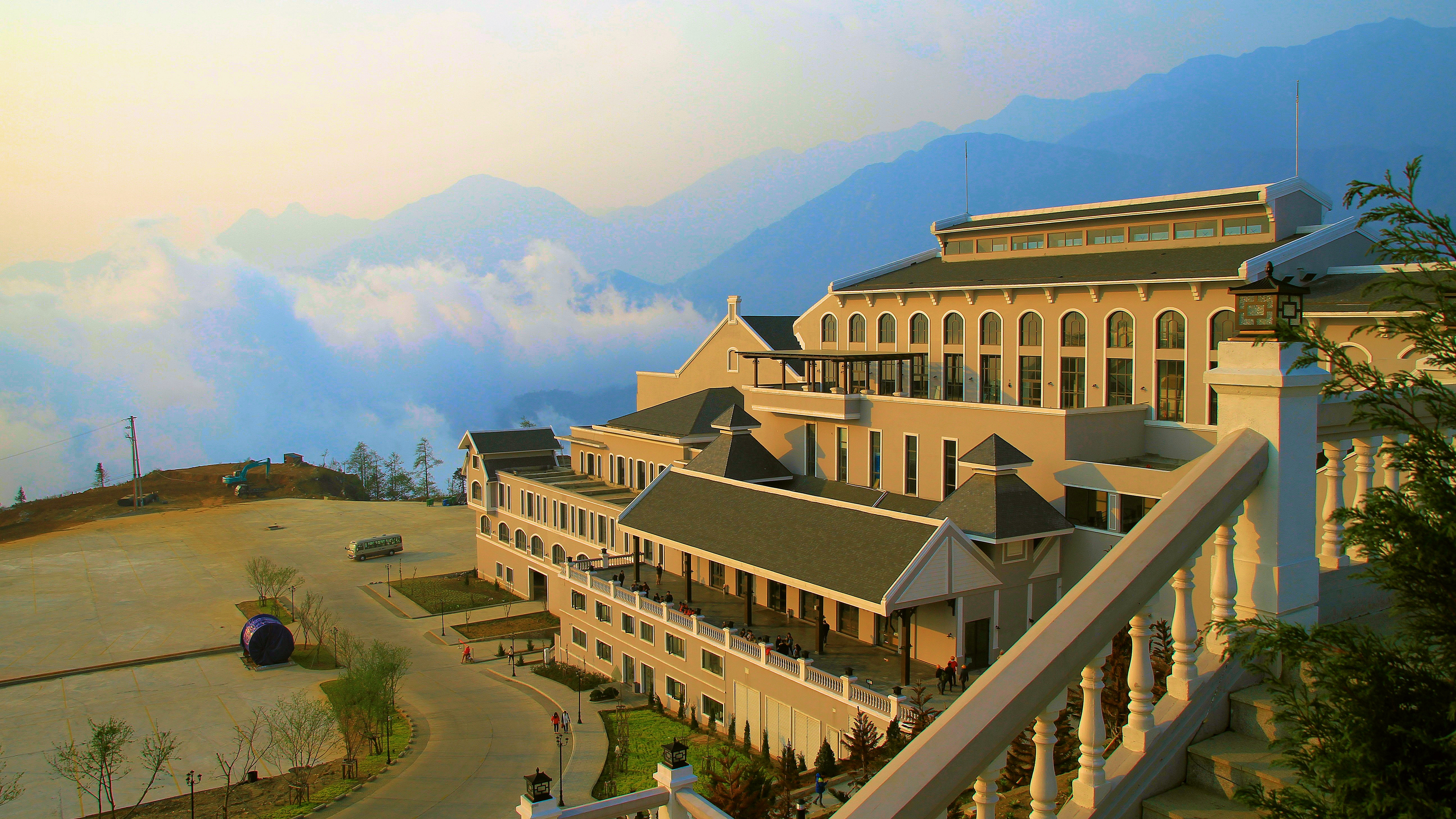
Mường Hoa Funicular Station, Fansipan

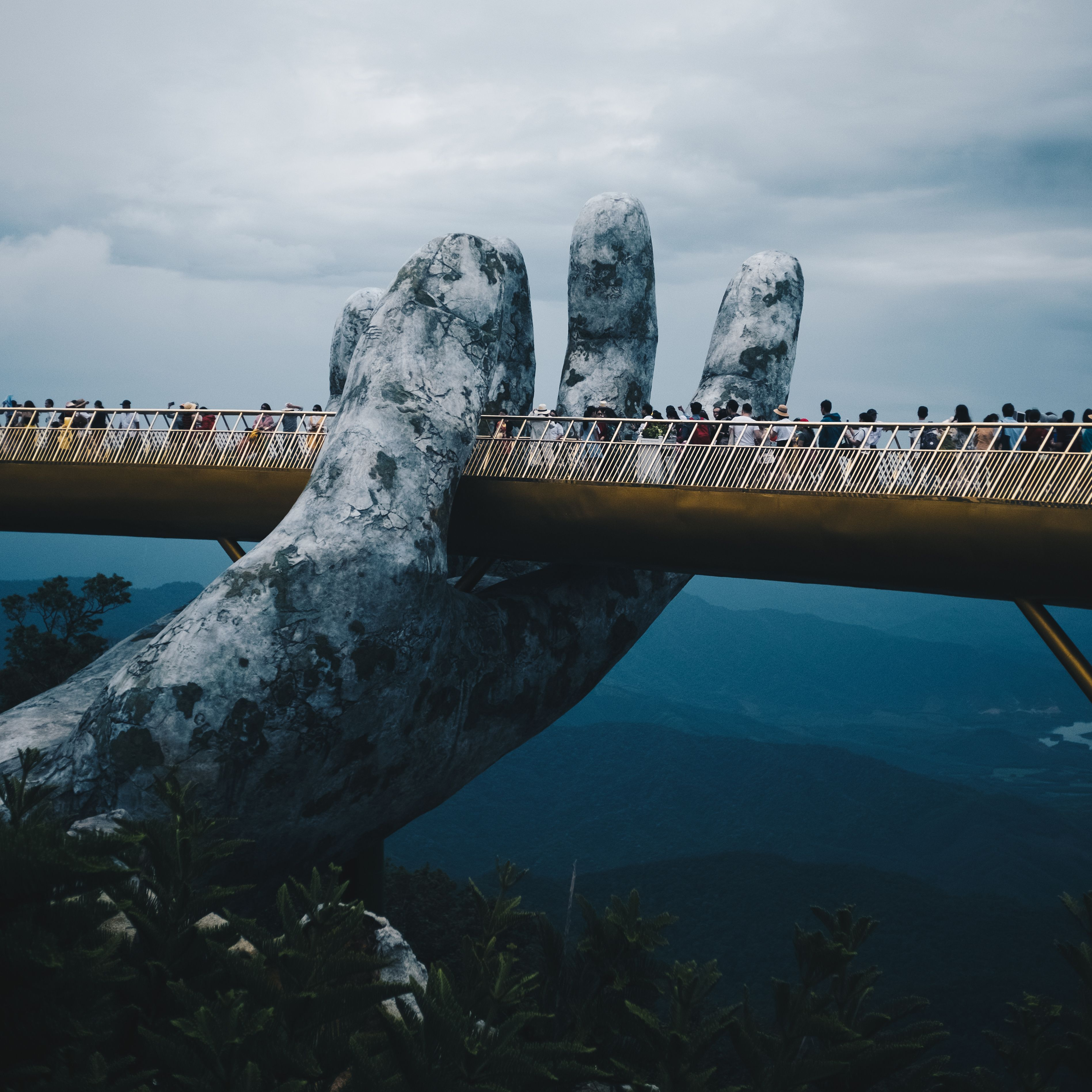
Sun World Ba Na Hills

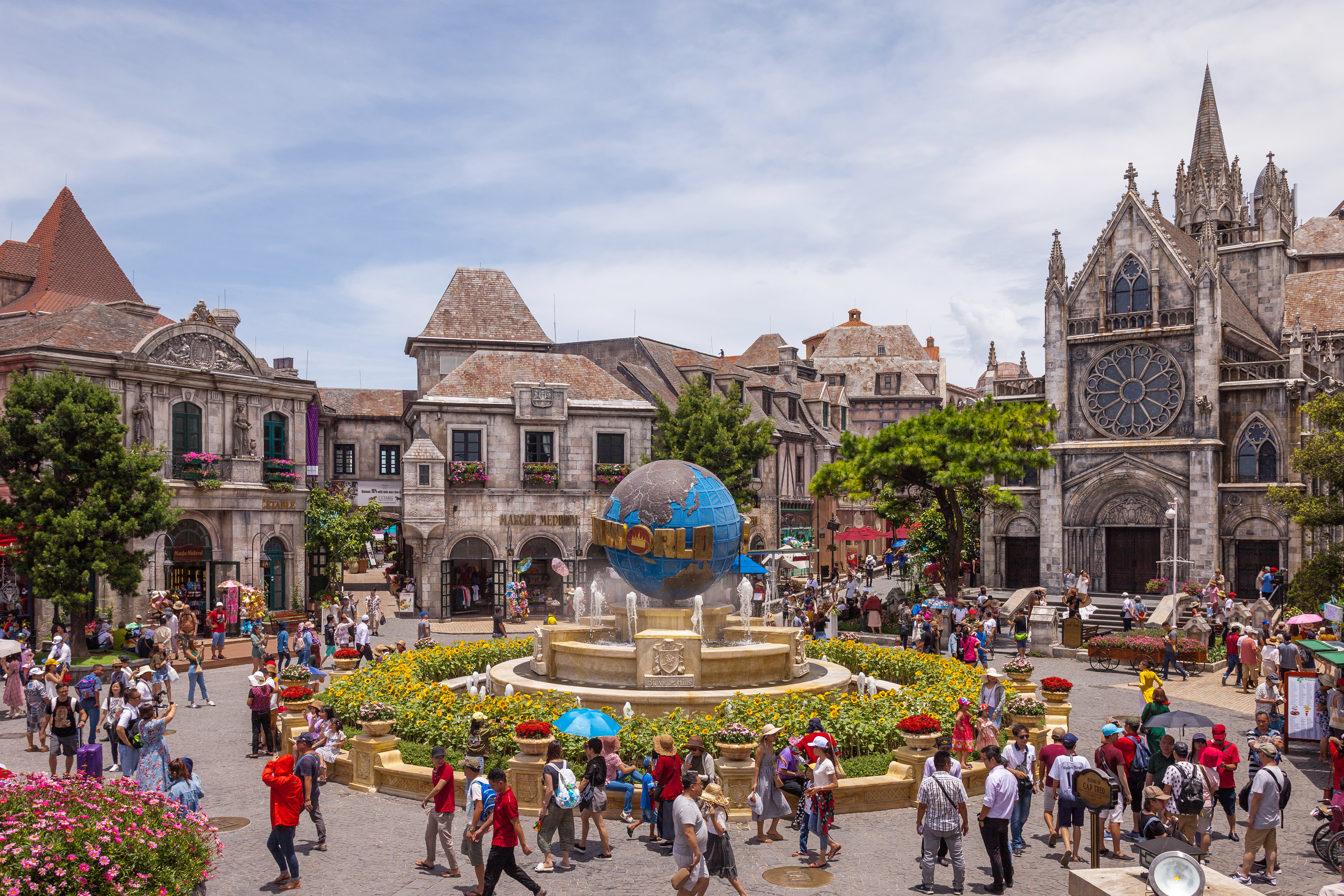
Sun World Ba Na Hills

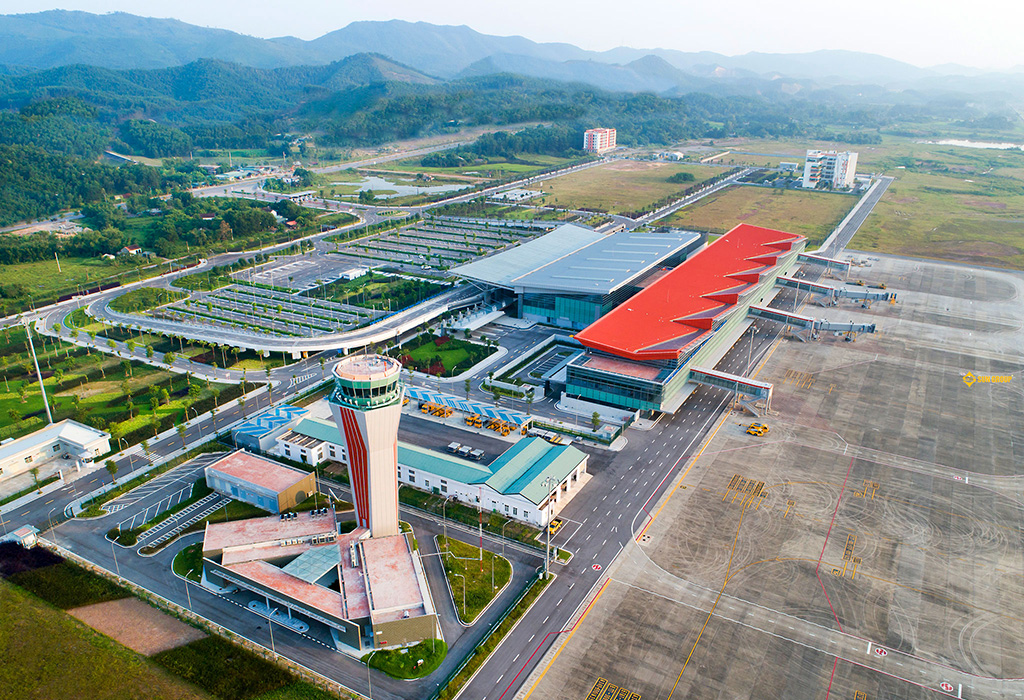
Van Don Airport, wholly owned by Sun Group

== See also ==
- Vinhomes
- Vingroup
