= Trinh Van Quyet =

Vietnamese entrepreneur

- Born: November 27, 1975 (age 50); Vĩnh Tường, Vĩnh Phúc, Vietnam
- Occupations: Chairman & CEO of FLC Group; Chairman of Bamboo Airways
- Known for: Owner of FLC Group; Owner of Bamboo Airways

Trinh Van Quyet (born November 27, 1975) is a Vietnamese entrepreneur, businessman, and billionaire.

Quyet has 108.86 million FLC and 279.5 million ROS shares. As of November 2016, with the combined value of ROS and FLC shares, Quyet's holding amounted to over 31 trillion dong ($1.395 billion). Quyet had taken the place of the richest man in Vietnam's stock market from Pham Nhat Vuong, Vingroup's chairman for a long time. However, with a surge in price, VIC shares have closed down the gap between Quyet's and Vuong's holdings. According to CafeF, the session will forever go down as the day of the "lightning fight" for the position of the richest man in the stock market.

At the close on November 11, 2016, Quyet's total holdings, which amounted to $1.371 billion, were only $31.86 million behind Vuong's.

In July 2014, Forbes Vietnam published the article "A lawyer doing business" focusing on Quyet who has attracted great attention with a series of major real estate projects. "A right time to invest and a right moment to get "risky" are what led to the successes of FLC Group's Chairman Trinh Van Quyet," states Forbes.

On March 29, 2022, spokesman for the Ministry of Public Security of Vietnam, Lieutenant General To An Xo announced that the Investigative Police Agency of the Ministry of Public Security of Vietnam had issued an arrest warrant for him for allegedly stock market manipulation.

== Family ==
Trinh Van Quyet was born and raised in Vinh Thinh, Vinh Tuong, Vinh Phuc. His father, Trinh Hong Quy, and mother, Do Thi Giap, were civil servants. "Studying at university, Trinh Van Quyet showed a great passion for business. In the second year of university, he founded the Tutor Office - one of the first tutor centers in Hanoi and gradually shifted to phone business. Phones or mobile phones back then were regarded as "hot" products generating fairly high profit which he used to support his sister's studying and open SMiC after graduating from university."

== Contribution ==
Forbes has regarded FLC Group's incredible growth as "a rare story in the real estate sector" and considered Quyet as a role model in the new entrepreneur generation.

"Last year, everyone is concerned if FLC Group can achieve what they promise. But this year, I see not a hint of worry. FLC Samson Beach & Golf Resort has greatly contributed to Thanh Hoa's tourism and the North Central Region," states Vice Chairperson of the Vietnamese National Assembly, Uong Chi Luu, at the inaugural ceremony of FLC Samson Beach & Golf Resort.

== Awards ==
At the age of 41, as FLC Group Chairman and the General Director of SMiC Company, Quyet has received a series of awards from trusted organization and the government.

== Scandals ==
=== Violation of the Law on Securities ===
From October 20 to October 24, 2017, Quyet, Chairman at the time, has sold 57 million of FLC Group's shares (Stock code: FLC) but did not report the sale to Vietnam's State Securities Commission (SSC) and the Ho Chi Minh City Stock Exchange (HoSE). The sale is conducted when FLC shares is at 7100-7700 VNĐ per share, with a combined value of more than 400 billion VNĐ. Right after the sale, FLC shares loses 10% of its value, dropping to 6500 VNĐ per share.

On November 10, 2017, the SSC has issued Decision No.1039/QĐ-XPVPHC, fining Quyet on violations in the securities field and the stock market. According to Point b, Article 1, Section 3; Point g in Articles 4 and 6 of Decree No.108/2013/NĐ-CP, supplemented by Articles 1 and 35 of Section 1 in Decree No. 145/2016/NĐ-CP, Quyet is fined 65 million VNĐ. Simultaneously, the SSC has also decided to fine FLC Faros Construction JSC (Stock code: ROS), with Quyet also as chairman, 130 million VNĐ for the same violations.

On December 11, 2017, in Official dispatch No. 896 sending to then-Minister of Finance Dinh Tien Dung, the Vice President of the Vietnam Association of Financial Investors (VAFI) had accused Quyet of selling 57 million shares, which equals to 9% of FLC's charter capital, "under the radar" and pointed out that Quyet had not purchased any of the shares, had not acted on the previously discussed plans of himself purchasing 37 million shares with the General meeting of shareholders and the entire stock market. Therefore, according to the VAFI, Quyet has violated Articles 1 and 2 of Section 9 "Outlining prohibited actions" in the June 29th 2006 edition of the Law on Securities.

Also during the time from October 20 to 24, FLC Faros had sold 13.6 million of AMD Group Investment and Minerals JSC. FLC Faros is considered an entity with ties to the AMD Group's CEO.

=== Making unannounced stock transactions ===
From January 10, 2022, Quyet suddenly announced the sale of 175 million FLC shares. According to the announcement, Quyet has registered to sell 175 million shares, with an estimated value of 1.75 trillion VNĐ. The transaction will last from January 10 to January 17. The reason behind the transaction according to Quyet is to restructure his assets. Before the transaction, Quyet is holding 215 million shares, which equals to about 30.34% of the company's charter capital. To date, FLC has over 710 million shares in circulation.

After the cancellation on January 11 by the HoSE and the block of Quyet stock account by the SSC on the previous day, on January 18, Quyet is fined 1.5 billion VNĐ and banned from any stock trading activities for 5 months by the SSC.

=== Prosecution and indictment ===
On March 29, 2022, Quyet was prosecuted and placed into temporary custody to be investigated on stock manipulating activities. Quyet was brought into criminal account by the Investigation Agency of the Ministry of Public Security (C01) on the charge of "stock market manipulation". The Ministry also arrested Trinh Thi Minh Hue and Trinh Thi Thuy Nga, Trinh Van Quyet's sisters, as accomplices in helping Mr' Quyet to manipulate the stock market.

On August 25, 2022, Quyet and his sisters were further prosecuted, this time on "Obtaining property by committing fraud" charges. Huong Tran Kieu Dung, former Deputy Chairwoman of FLC Group and former Chairwoman of BOS Securities JSC, is also prosecuted on the same charges.

Following a two-week trial, Quyet was convicted on August 5, 2024 by the Hanoi People’s Court of fraud and was sentenced to 21 years' imprisonment. His sisters as well as former Ho Chi Minh City Stock Exchange chair Tran Dac Sinh and former deputy CEOs Le Hai Tra and Tram Tuan Vu were also sentenced on related charges.
