= Masan Group =

Vietnamese conglomerate founded in 1993

- Type: Public
- Traded as: HOSE: MSN
- Industry: Conglomerate
- Founded: 1996
- Founder: Nguyễn Đăng Quang
- Headquarters: Techcombank Saigon Tower (or Masan Tower) 23 Lê Duẩn Boulevard, Ho Chi Minh City, Vietnam
- Key people: Nguyễn Đăng Quang (Chairman)
- Brands: Phuc Long Heritage; MEATDeli; Techcombank; Omachi
- Revenue: ▲83.178 trillion VND (2024)
- Net income: ▲1.999 trillion VND (2024)
- Total assets: ▲73.039 trillion VND (2017)
- Owner: Nguyễn Đăng Quang
- Subsidiaries: WinCommerce; Masan Consumer; Masan High-Tech Materials
- Website: https://www.masangroup.com/

Masan Group Corporation (Vietnamese: Công ty Cổ phần Tập đoàn Ma San) is a Vietnamese publicly-traded conglomerate. The group was founded and is headquartered in Ho Chi Minh City, and is now among the top three largest conglomerate of the private sector in Vietnam in terms of market capitalization. Its subsidiaries include Masan Consumer Holdings (consumer staples), Techcombank (financial services) and Masan Resources (mining). The company was listed on the Ho Chi Minh Stock Exchange since 2009.

Masan Group was among the first domestic Vietnamese corporations to adopt a growth strategy that taps foreign sources of capital for acquisition-driven expansion. In April 2011, the group's subsidiary Masan Consumer Corp. became the recipient of Vietnam's largest private-equity investment when KKR paid US$159 million for a 10% stake in the company. This investment was viewed as a validation of Vietnam's M&A potential.

The company was founded by its chairman, Nguyen Dang Quang, who following a doubling of the share price in the six months to January 2018, had a net worth of US$1.2 billion.

In December 2019, Masan Group acquired a controlling stake in Vingroup's retail division VinCommerce, which operates under the VinMart brand.
