= Nguyễn Thị Phương Thảo =

Vietnamese businesswoman and billionaire

- Born: June 7, 1970 (age 56); Hanoi, North Vietnam
- Education: Plekhanov Russian University of Economics (BA); D. Mendeleev University of Chemical Technology of Russia (PhD)
- Occupations: President & CEO, VietJet Air
- Spouse: Nguyễn Thanh Hùng
- Children: 2

Nguyễn Thị Phương Thảo (born June 7, 1970) is a Vietnamese businesswoman, and the president and CEO of VietJet Air, president of Sovico Group and vice president of HDBank. After Phạm Nhật Vượng, she is the second Vietnamese person (and the first Southeast Asian woman) to be recognized by Forbes as a US$ billionaire.

== Biography ==
Thảo became a millionaire at age 21 while studying finance and economics in Moscow, where she began distributing fax machines, plastic and rubber from Japan, Hong Kong and South Korea in the then Soviet Union. Since then she has developed a portfolio of business interests, including VietJet and Sovico Holdings, that itself holds a 90 per cent stake in Ho Chi Minh City's Dragon City development. She holds bachelor's degrees in financial credit management and labor economics at the Plekhanov Russian University of Economics and a doctorate in economic management from the D. Mendeleev University of Chemical Technology of Russia.

She ranked 62nd in the list of Power Women 2016. She was listed in Asia's 50 Power Businesswomen 2016.

After she took VietJet Air public in February 2017, she became Vietnam's first self-made woman billionaire, second billionaire overall (after Phạm Nhật Vượng) and Southeast Asia's only female billionaire. In early 2021, her net worth was estimated at US$2.1 billion. She also has investments in HD Bank and real estate, including three beach resorts. In 2021, she signed a memorandum of understanding with the University of Oxford's Linacre College for a donation of GBP£155million. The college intends to petition the Privy Council to change its name to Thao College. In June 2022, she was featured on the list of the Global 100 by the International Hospitality Institute as one of the 100 Most Powerful People in Global Hospitality.

== Personal life ==
Thảo has a daughter and a son, Tommy Nguyen. Her son has previously studied at Oxford University's economics & management department and has founded an express delivery company with investment from VietJet.

== Awards and honors ==
- Knight of the Legion of Honour (France, 2021)
