= Nguyen Dang Quang =

Vietnamese businessman

Nguyễn Đăng Quang
- Born: 23 August 1963 (age 62); Quảng Trị
- Education: Plekhanov Russian University of Economics; National Academy of Sciences of Belarus
- Occupation: Businessman
- Known for: Founder and chairman, Masan Group
- Spouse: Married

Nguyễn Đăng Quang (born 23 August 1963) is a Vietnamese billionaire businessman.

Quang is the co-founder and chairman of Masan Group, a consumer goods company best known for selling fish sauce, instant noodles, chili sauce, sausages, and animal feed.

== Early life ==
Quang earned an MBA from the Plekhanov Russian University of Economics in Moscow, followed by a doctorate in technical sciences from the National Academy of Sciences of Belarus.

== Career ==
Quang founded Masan in the 1990s.

Quang and his wife own 49% of the company's share, and his co-founder Hồ Hùng Anh, the vice chairman, owned 47.6% as of September 2015, although his holding as of January 2018 was not known.

Following a doubling of the share price in the six months to January 2018, Quang had a net worth of US$1.2 billion, according to Bloomberg L.P. He became Vietnam's third billionaire.
