= VietJet Air =

Low-cost airline of Vietnam

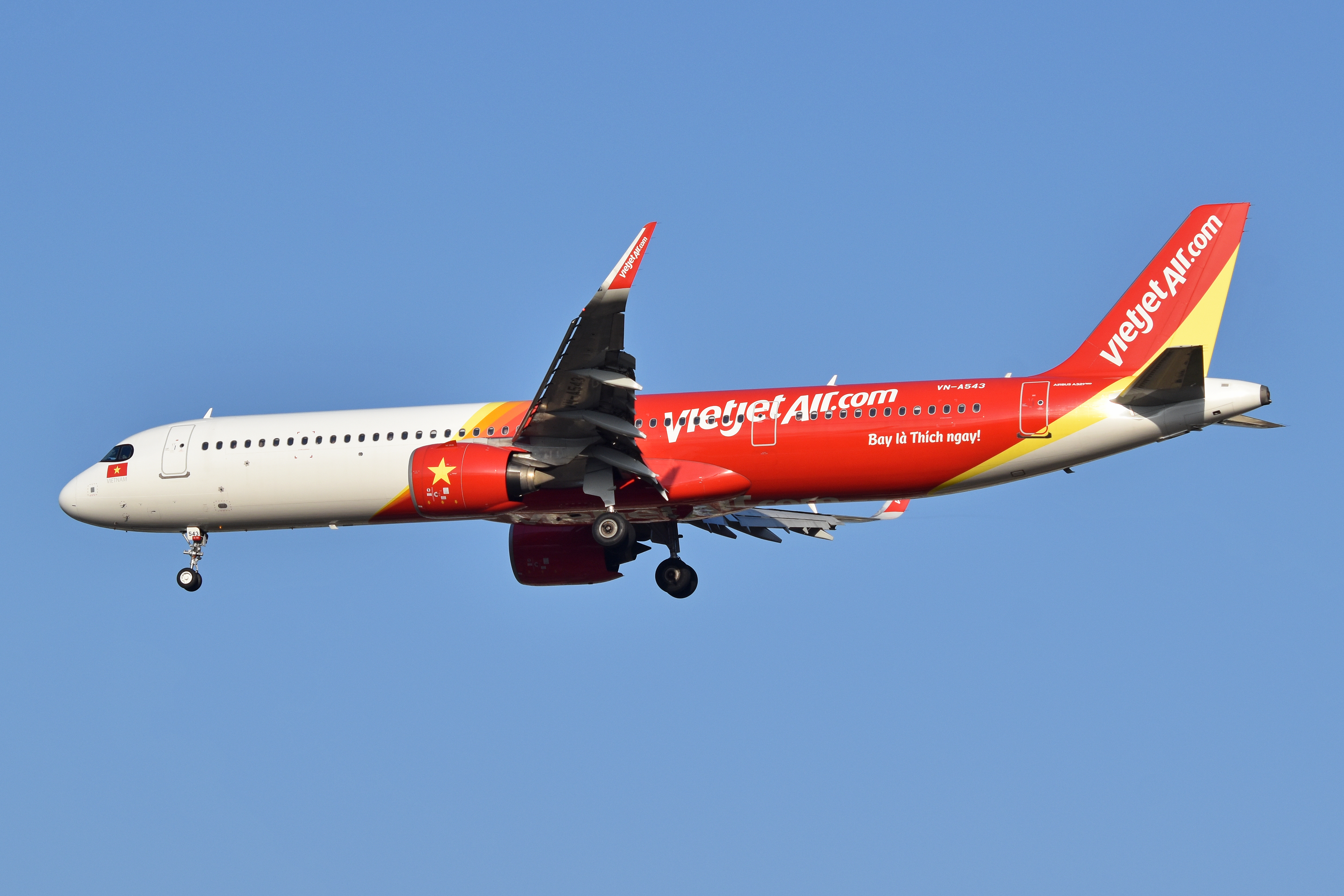
- VietJet Air Airbus A321neo
IATA	ICAO	Call sign
VJ	VJC	VIETJET
- Founded: 30 November 2007; 18 years ago
- Commenced operations: 25 December 2011; 14 years ago
- Operating bases: Da Nang; Hai Phong; Hanoi; Ho Chi Minh City; Nha Trang
- Frequent-flyer program: Skyjoy
- Subsidiaries: Thai VietJet Air; VietJet Qazaqstan
- Fleet size: 104
- Destinations: 56
- Parent company: Sovico Holdings, HDBank
- Traded as: HOSE: VJC
- Headquarters: Tân Sơn Hòa (Tân Bình District), Ho Chi Minh City, Vietnam
- Key people: Nguyễn Thị Phương Thảo (CEO)
- Revenue: 40.414 trillion VNĐ ($1.722 billion USD)
- Total assets: 68 trillion VNĐ ($2.557 billion USD)
- Employees: 2,000
- Website: www.vietjetair.com

Vietjet Aviation JSC (Vietnamese: CTCP Hàng không Vietjet), operating as VietJet Air, is a Vietnamese low-cost airline based in Hanoi. It was the first privately owned airline to be established in Vietnam, being granted its initial approval to operate by the Vietnamese Ministry of Finance during November 2007. As of its launch in December 2011, it became the second private airline to offer domestic service in Vietnam, as well as the fifth airline overall to offer civil domestic flights. VietJet Air is owned by Sovico Holdings, HDBank, other organisational investors, and individual stakeholders.

Originally planned to be AirAsia's franchise in Vietnam, the carrier's launch was beset by long delays attributed to various causes, such as the Great Recession and regulatory issues as well as other disputes that resulted in the withdrawal of AirAsia, making VietJet an independent business. Despite the setbacks, VietJet Air's first flight was operated on December 25, 2011, flying from Ho Chi Minh City to Hanoi. The carrier carried its 10 millionth passenger in December 2014, and the 25 millionth passenger in December 2015.

== History ==
=== Foundation delays ===
Founded in 2007, the airline's founding team included Robert Hughes, an American who led the company through its initial year. The airline has its head office in the Vạn Phúc Diplomatic Corps in Ba Đình district, Hanoi It was the first privately owned airline to be established in Vietnam, and as of its launch in December 2011, it became the second private airline (after Air Mekong) to offer domestic service in Vietnam, as well as the fifth airline overall not counting Indochina Airlines, which ceased operations in November 2009 to offer civil domestic flights, after Vietnam Airlines, Pacific Airlines, Air Mekong and the Vietnam Air Service Company (VASCO). During its initial plan, the Hanoi-based airline stated its intention to offer flights to Ho Chi Minh City and Da Nang, gradually expanding its network to include other Asian destinations, such as Hong Kong, Bangkok, Singapore, Melbourne, and cities in South China like Beijing. Nguyen Thi Phuong Thao has been the airline's President and CEO since December 2011.

Initially, VietJet had shown the intention to commence flights in late 2008 or early 2009. Throughout the next few years, the expected launch date was repeatedly pushed back, first to late 2009, then mid-2010. Airline officials gave different reasons for the delays, including increased fuel prices and other financial problems, as well as unresolved branding conflicts with the Civil Aviation Administration of Vietnam (CAAV).

Although Malaysian budget carrier AirAsia announced in February 2010 that it planned to purchase a 30% stake in the airline through a joint venture agreement, the carrier rescinded its plans in October 2011, citing "a failure to obtain Vietnamese regulatory approvals".

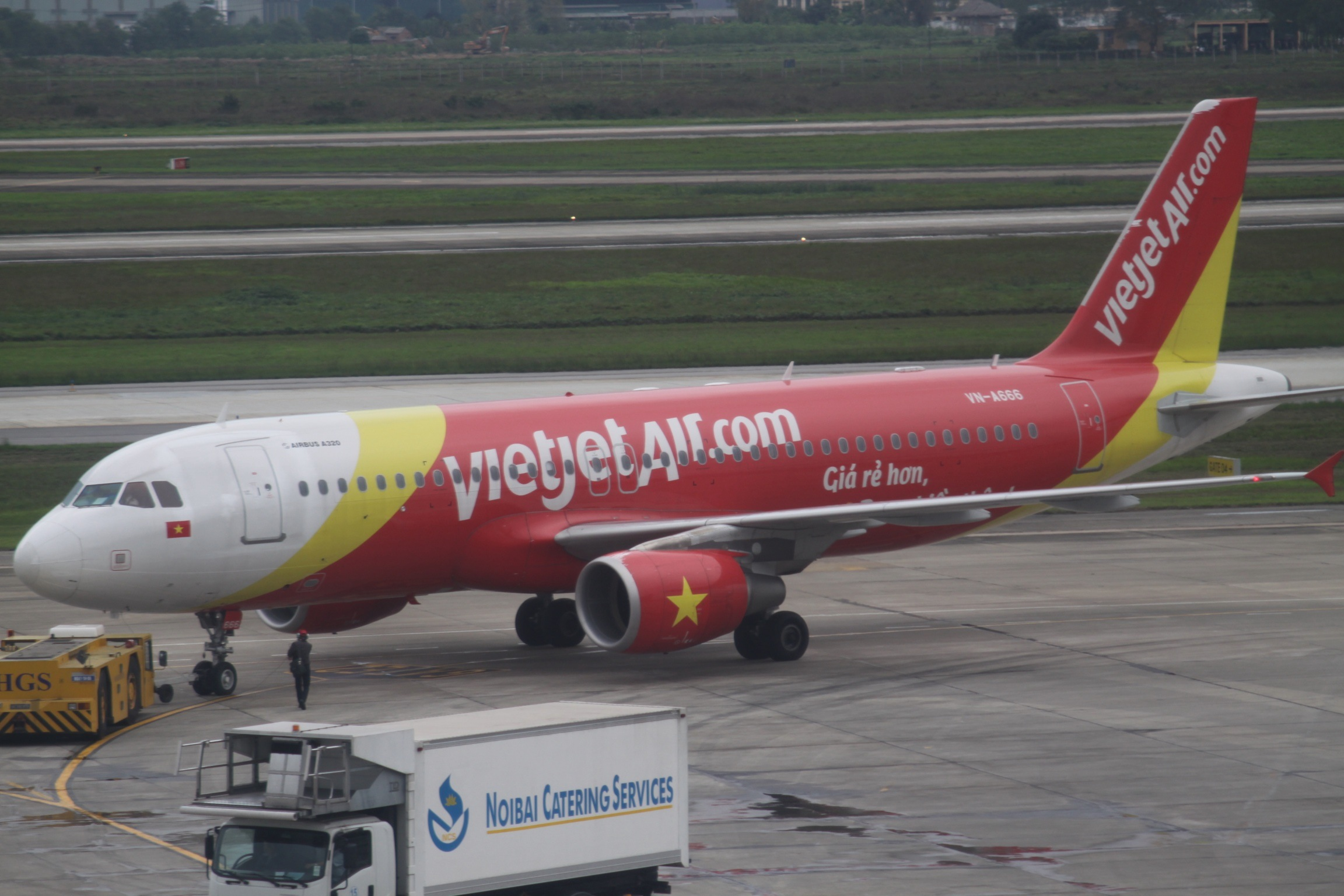
One of VietJet's first aircraft, an Airbus A320-200(VN-697) at Noi Bai in 2012 in VietJet's original livery

By February 2011, VietJet was said to be completing final stages prior to launch before its operation license expired in June. The airline's maiden flight occurred on December 25, 2011, flying from Ho Chi Minh City to Hanoi.

=== Operations ===
The Vietnam aviation authority fined VietJet Air US$960 in 2012 for organizing five women of candidates in a local beauty contest to perform a Hawaiian themed-dance without first gaining permission to celebrate its maiden flight to the tourist hub of Nha Trang.

On February 9, 2013, the airline launched its first international flight between Ho Chi Minh City and Bangkok, becoming the first Vietnamese private airline to enter the international market.

In February 2014, at the opening of that year's Singapore Airshow, the airline firmed up orders with Airbus for 60 A320 aircraft at a list price of $6.4 billion. Previously, the airline had signed a Memorandum of Understanding with Airbus for 92 planes in the A320 family.

In June 2015, at the Paris Air Show, VietJet ordered six additional Airbus A321 single-aisle jets worth $682 million at list prices from Airbus to meet demand on some of its busiest routes, like Hanoi and Ho Chi Minh City; VietJet purchased a further 30 later that year at the Dubai Airshow, which included 21 A321neos along with 9 A321ceos. In May 2016 during a state visit of US President Barack Obama, an order for 200 Boeing 737 MAX aeroplanes was signed, with deliveries to start in 2019. In September 2016, CEO Nguyen Thi Phuong Thao announced an order for 20 A321 single-aisle aircraft from Airbus. The signing took place during a state visit of French President Francois Hollande. During the 2018 Farnborough Airshow, Thai VietJet, VietJet's Thai subsidiary, ordered 100 Boeing 737 MAXs (80 MAX 10s and 20 MAX 8s) and 50 A321neos.

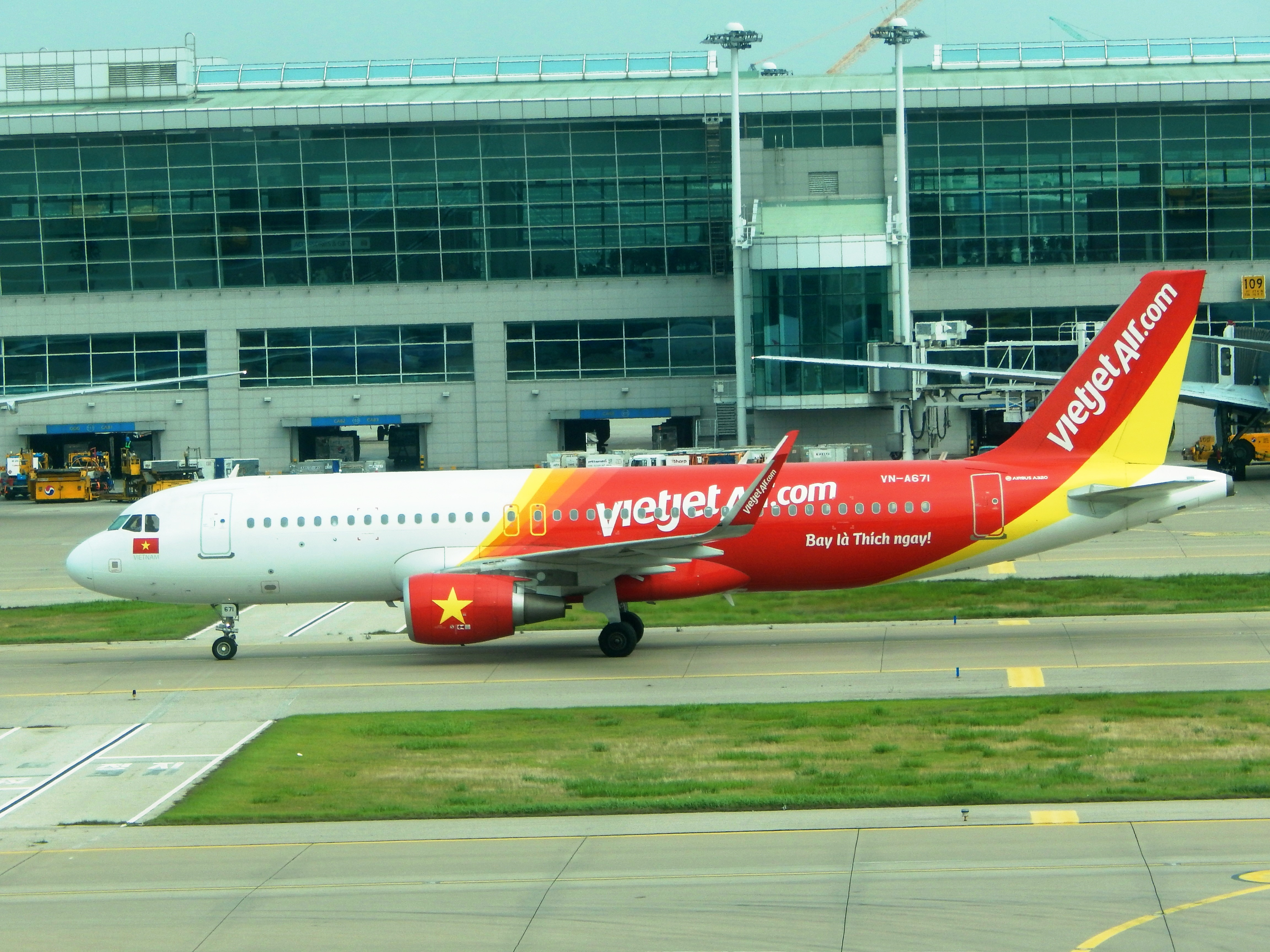
A VietJet A320-200 at Incheon in 2016

=== Public offering ===
VietJet completed its initial public offering (IPO) on the Ho Chi Minh City Stock Exchange (HOSE) on February 28, 2017 at an initial price of ₫90,000 (US$ 4.02) per share. The share price immediately rose by 20%, the maximum allowed for newly listed companies. The airline raised $167 million from the listing, making it the biggest IPO on the Vietnamese stock market to date and accounting for 1.5% of HOSE's capitalization at the time. The air hostess have been seen dancing around in bikini and doing bikini dance and belly dance.

=== New routes ===
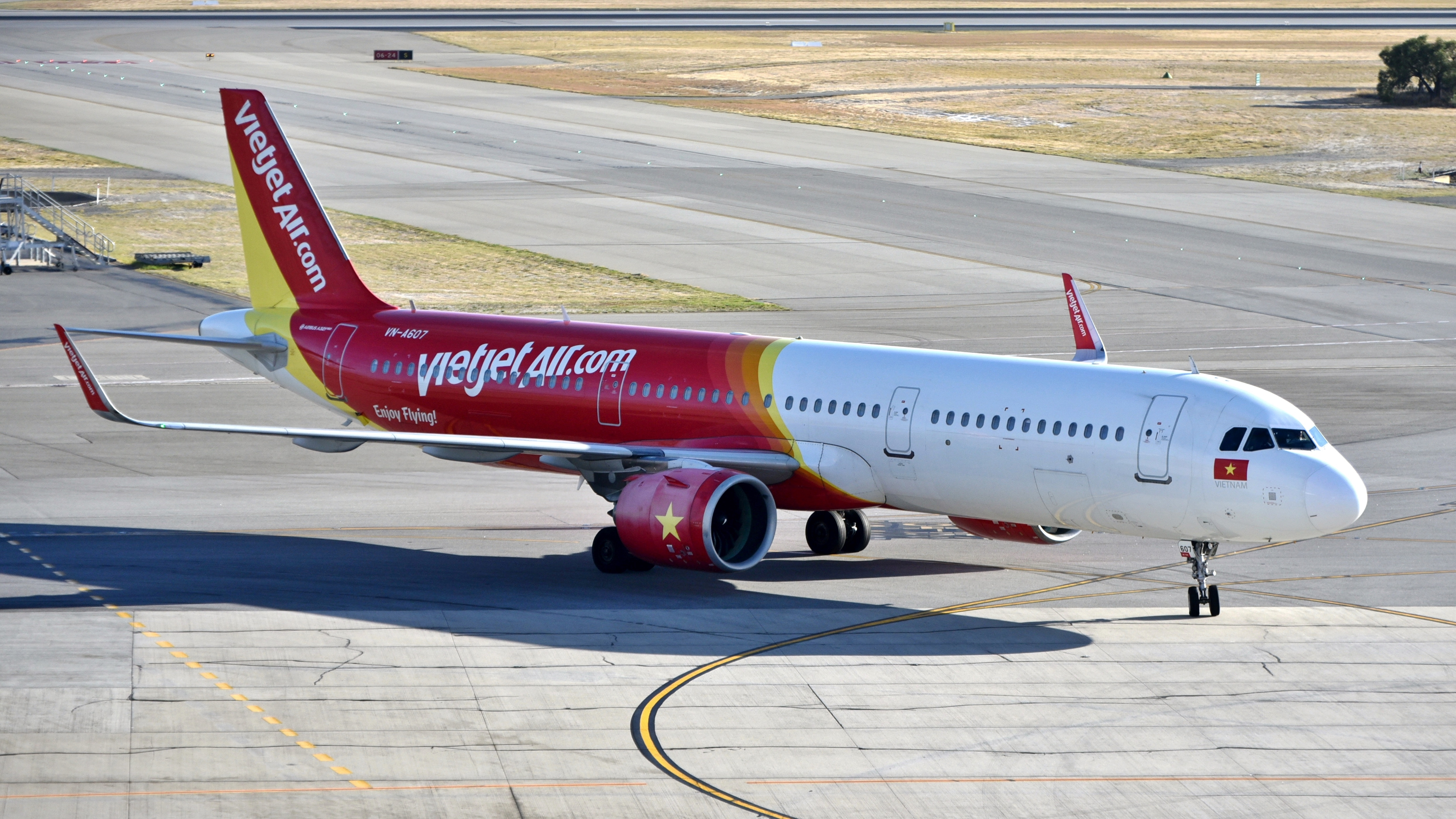
A VietJet A321neo at Perth Airport in 2025 in the modern livery

On January 15, 2025, VietJet announced the addition of four new routes to China. Commencing March 30, 2025, three new routes will be added to its service namely Ho Chi Minh-Beijing Daxing, Hanoi-Guangzhou and Ho Chi Minh-Guangzhou. Subsequently, another new route between Hanoi and Beijing Daxing will begin on April 1, 2025. A new inaugural route to Auckland will begin in September 2025.

Vietjet launched direct flights connecting Ho Chi Minh City (SGN) and Colombo, Sri Lanka (CMB), in August 2026 with four round-trip flights per week. Plans were also revealed to extend to route to the Maldives. HCMC-Colombo-Male flights are to begin in December. The new service, announced on May 8, 2026, aims to strengthen bilateral trade, tourism, and connectivity between Vietnam and South Asia, while acting as a gateway for travelers from Australia, Japan, and South Korea.

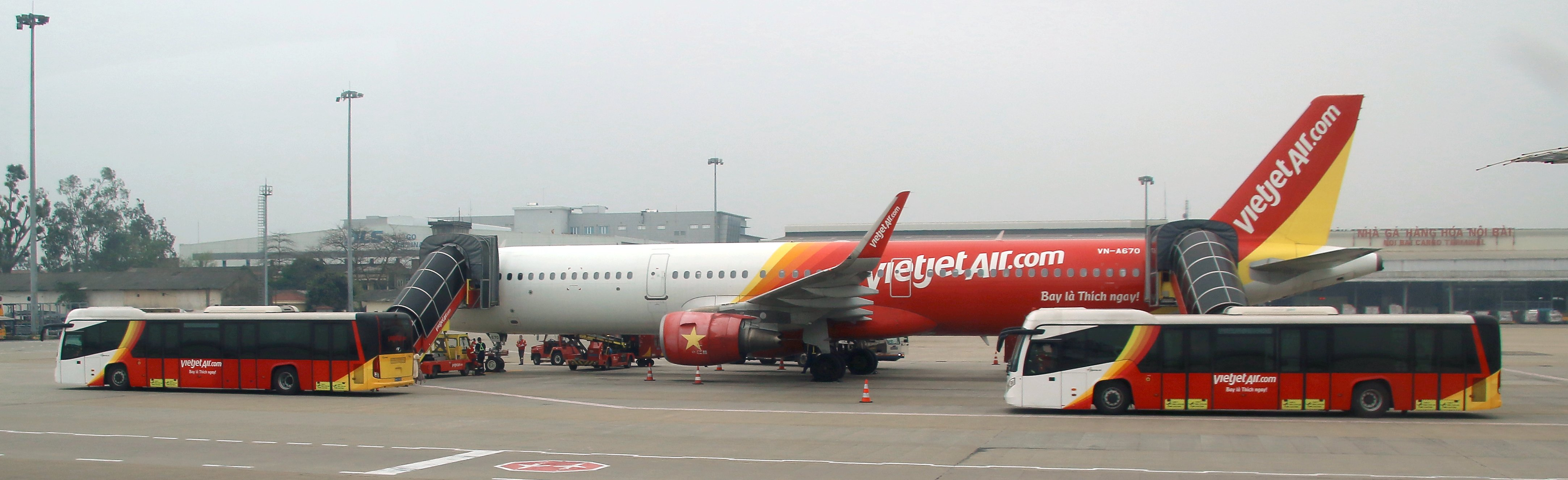
Vietjet Air and its own ground service vehicles at Noi Bai International Airport

=== Transition to in-house ground services ===
Vietjet took over ground handling services at Tan Son Nhat Airport from former partner Saigon Ground Services (SAGS) on April 20, 2025. The transition coincided with the peak travel season during the Reunification Day and Labour Day holiday in Vietnam, as well as the change of domestic terminals at Tan Son Nhat Airport, leading to mass delays of hundreds of flights, causing significant meltdown across the airline's network. This stirred up serious controversies over the airline, with thousands of passengers requesting an explanation and compensation for the inconvenience and loss they had experienced.

The Civil Aviation Authority of Vietnam (CAAV) has instructed Vietjet to arrange full staff and equipment deployment and coordinate with other ground service providers to ensure appropriate operation.

In 2025, Vietjet Ground Services was reorganized as Airport NEO Ground Services Company.

=== Second subsidiaries ===
On May 8, 2025, during the state visit by General Secretary of the Communist Party of Vietnam - Tô Lâm to Kazakhstan, Vietjet Air and Qazaq Air announced a strategic partnership to form the new subsidiaries, called Vietjet Qazaqstan.

== Corporate affairs ==
=== Business trends ===
The key trends for VietJet are (as of the financial year ending 31 December):

	Revenue (Note: "Consolidated revenue") (VNDtr)	Net profit (VNDb)	Number of passengers (m)	Number of international routes	Passenger load factor (%)	On-time performance (%)	Fleet size	References
2017	42.3	5,303	16.7	52	84	86	54	
2018	53.5	5,335	21.3	66	83	84	74	
2019	50.6	3,807	23.7	85	82	86	78	
2020	18.2	69	12.1	-	74	87	71	
2021	12.8	80	5.4	33	67	94	76	
2022	40.1	−2,261	20.6	48	80	92	75	
2023	58.3	231	25.3	80	85		87	
2024	72.0	1,404	25.9	101	87		94	
2025	82.0	2,123	28.2		86		107	

=== Brand identity and livery ===
To attract sponsorships and advertisement contracts, VietJet is known by its strategy to place promoted and sponsored content on its aircraft livery.

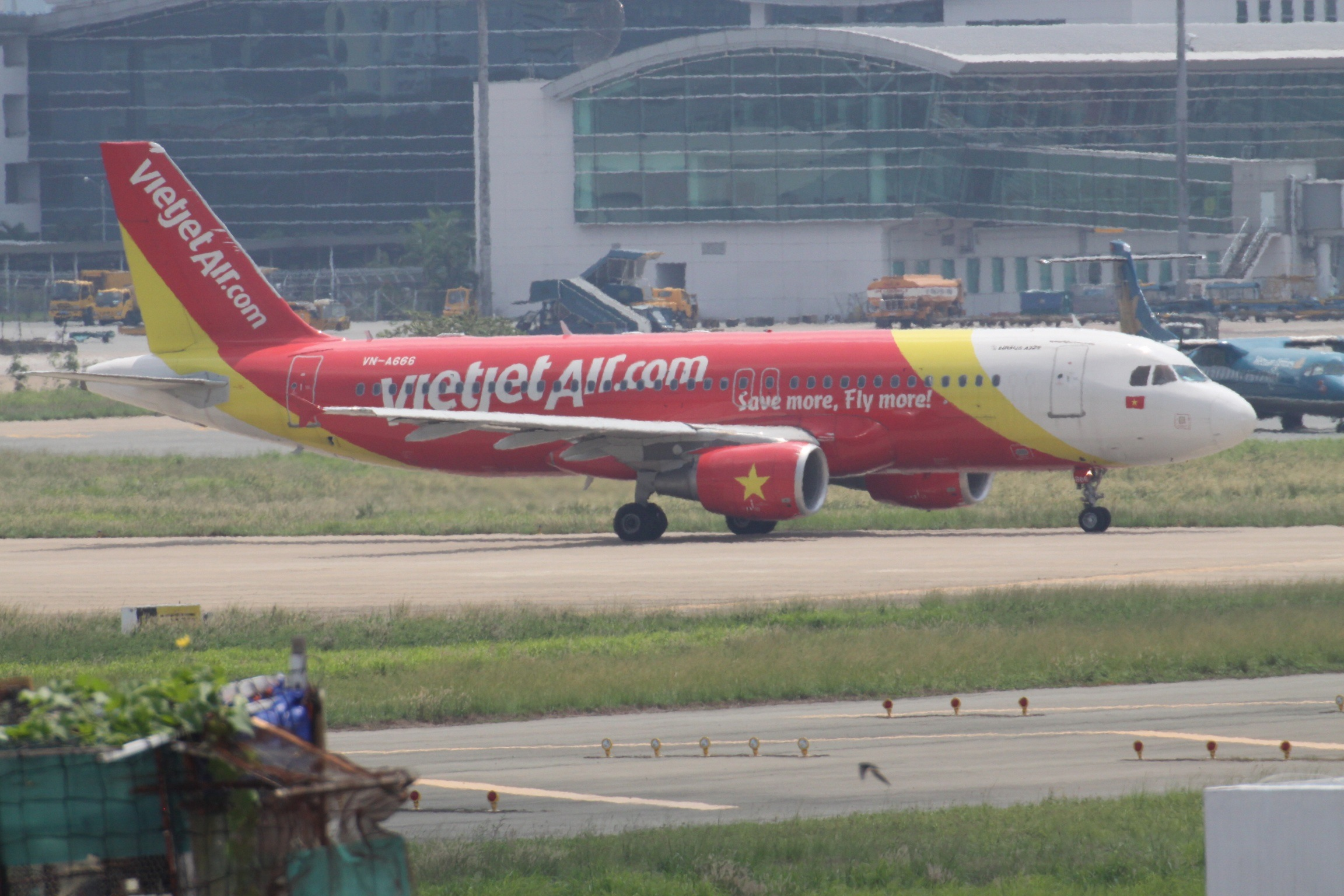
VietJet's "debut" livery in 2011.

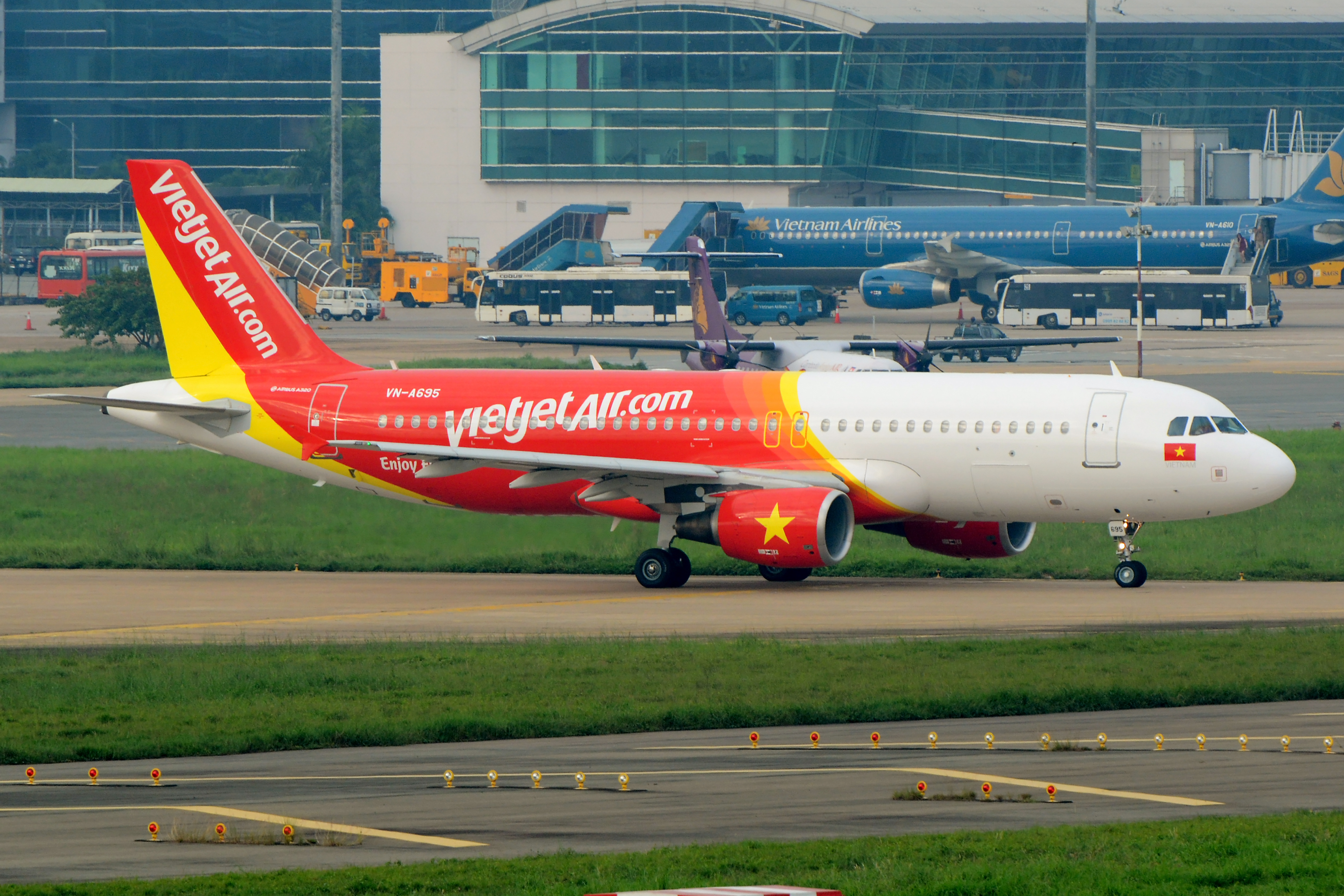
VietJet's standardized livery template having been used since 2012, with space for promoted content.

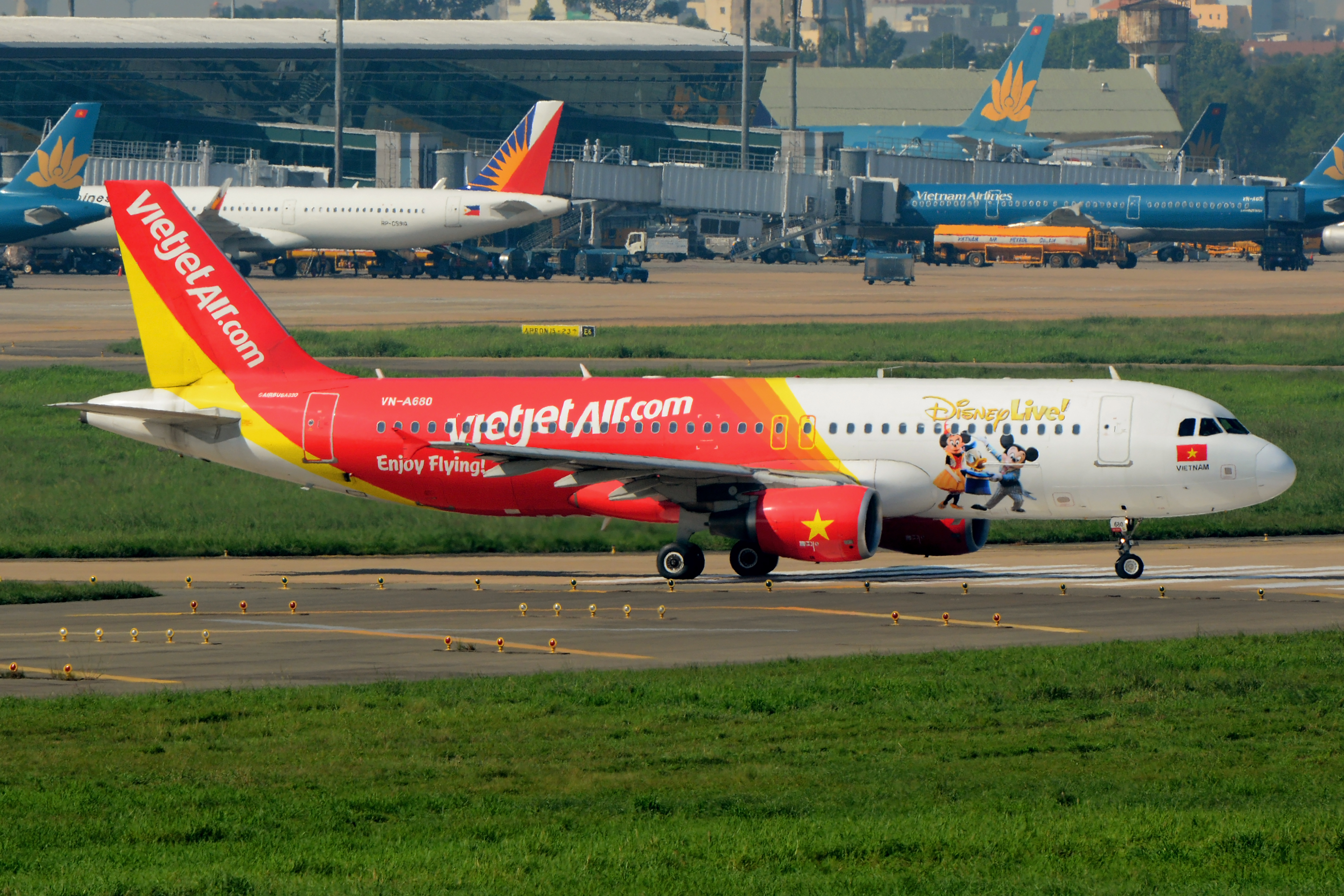
A VietJet "Disney Live!" livery, as seen in 2014.

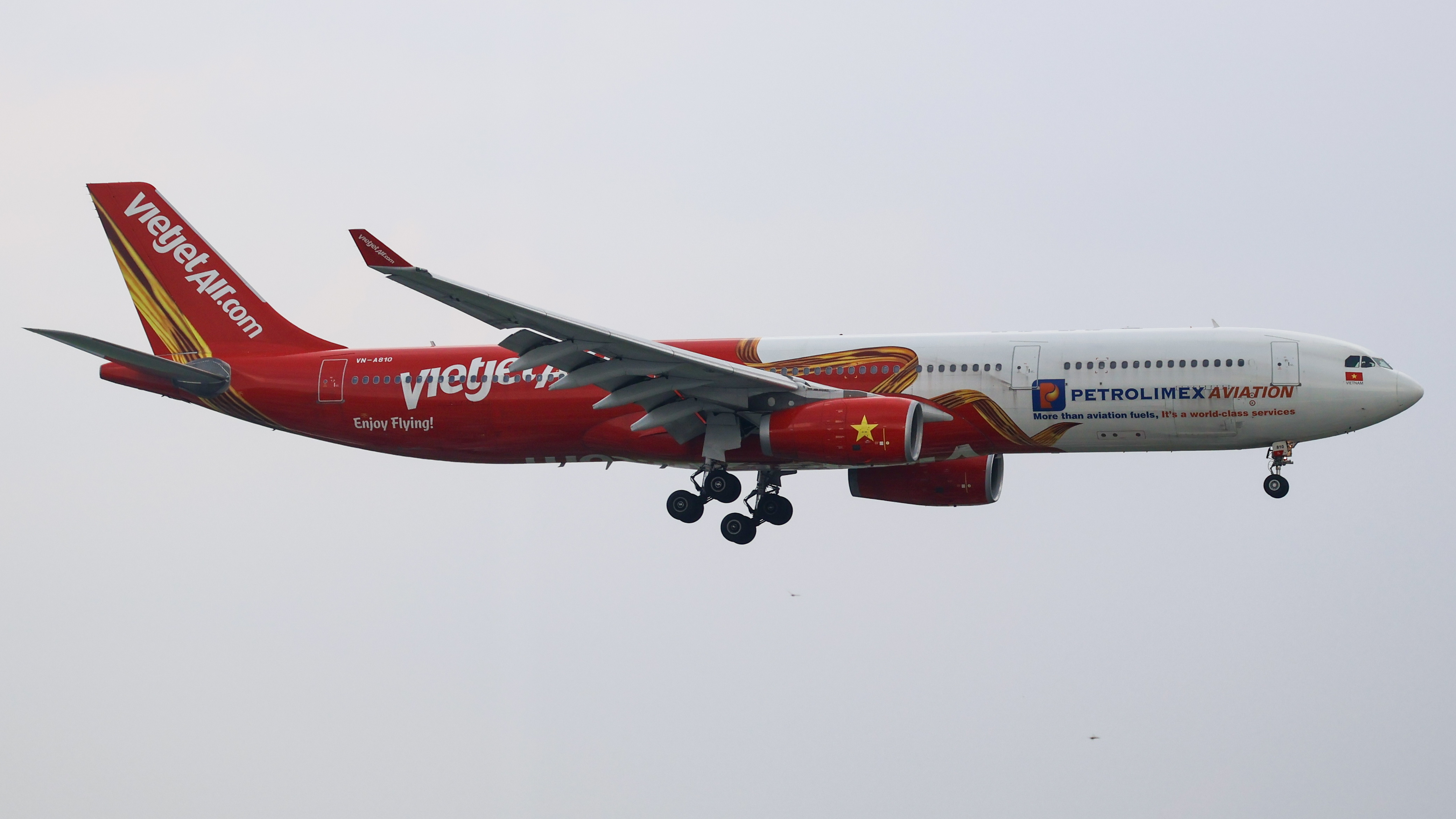
A VietJet Petrolimex livery, with a 2021 revised livery template exclusively for Airbus A330s

== Destinations ==
Countries served by VietJet as of May 2026

As of November 2023, VietJet Air serves 13 countries and 99 routes.

=== Codeshare agreements ===
VietJet Air codeshares with the following airlines:

- Japan Airlines
- Lao Airlines

=== Interline agreements ===
- Qatar Airways
- Emperor Airways

== Fleet ==
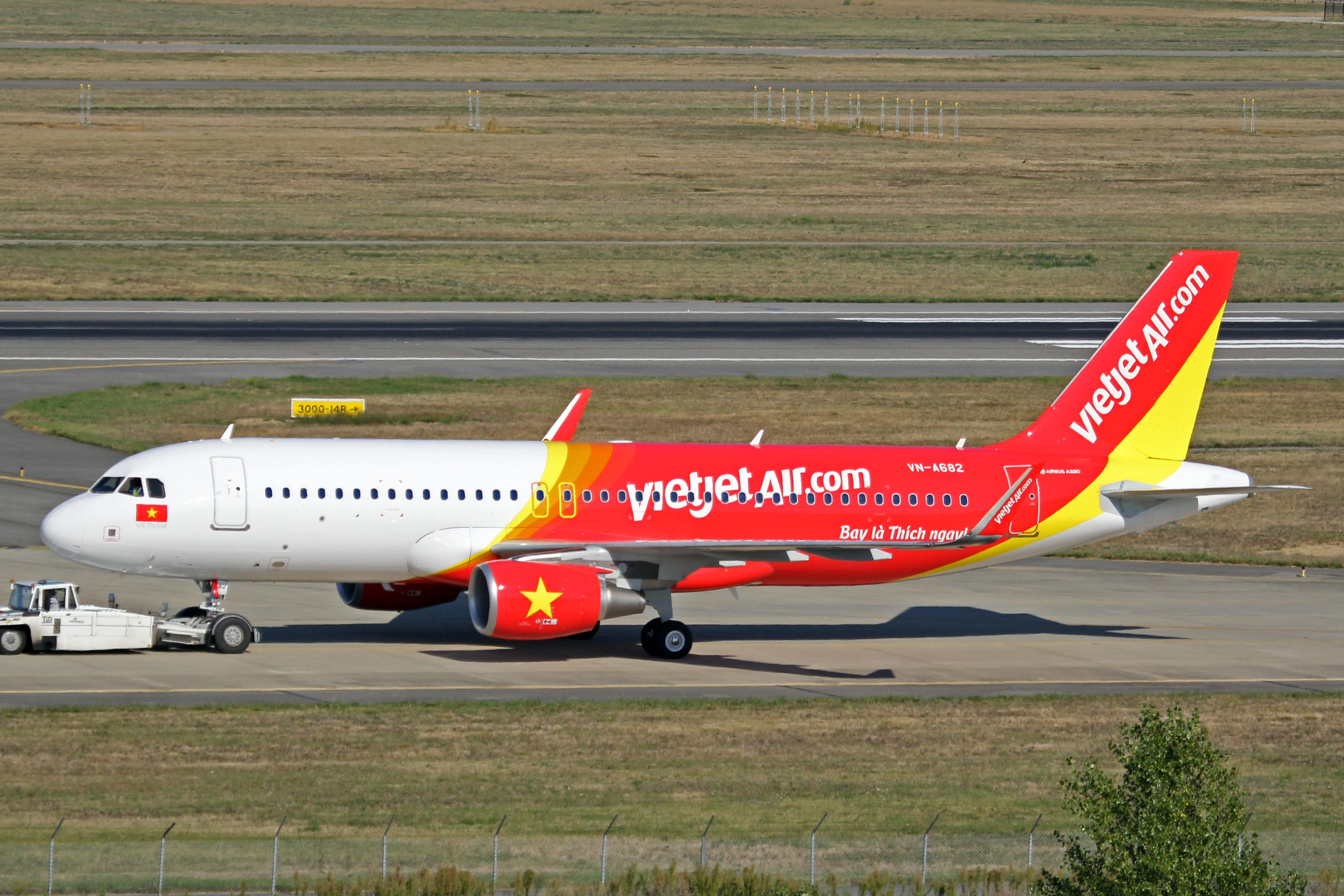
VietJet Air Airbus A320-200

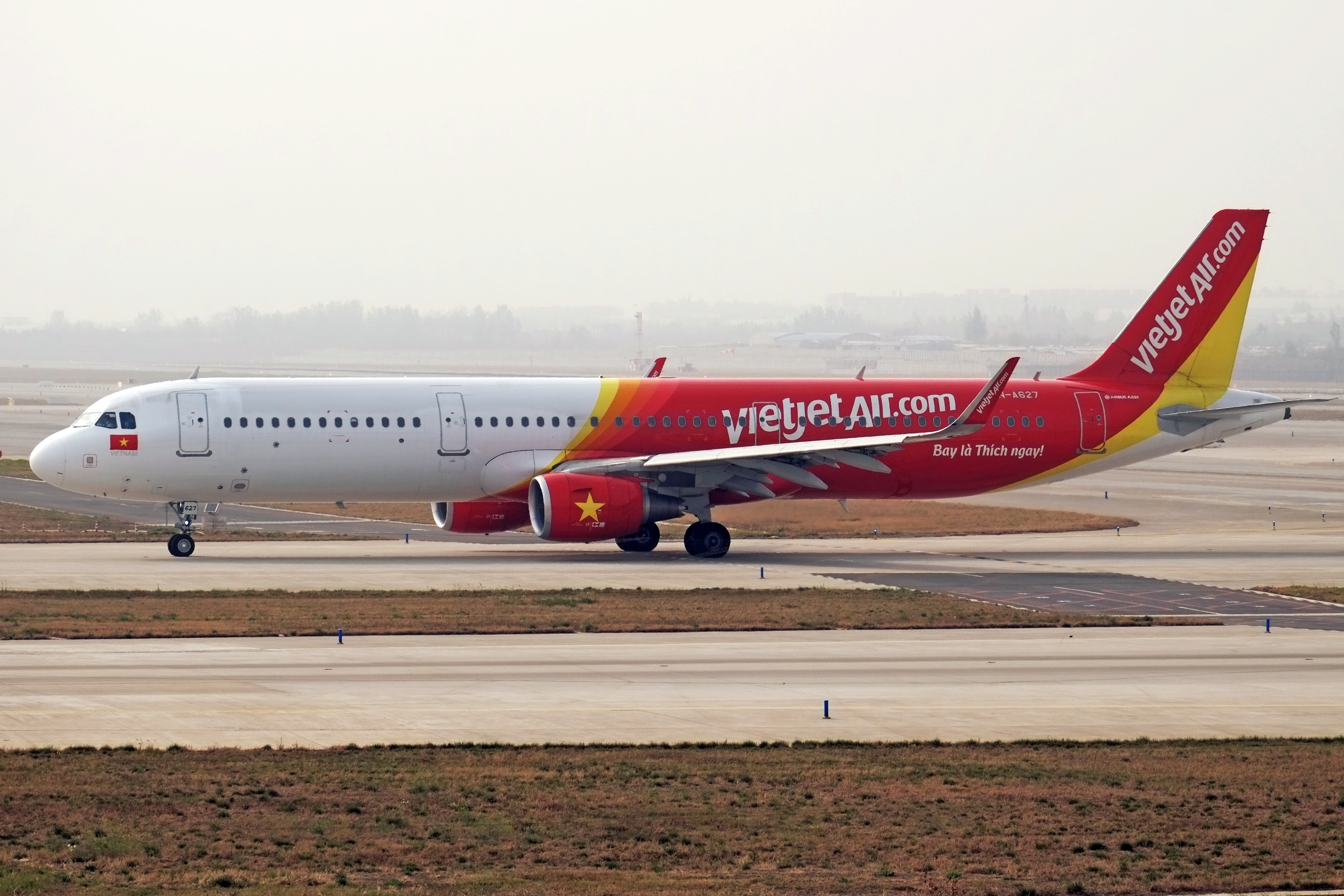
VietJet Air Airbus A321-200

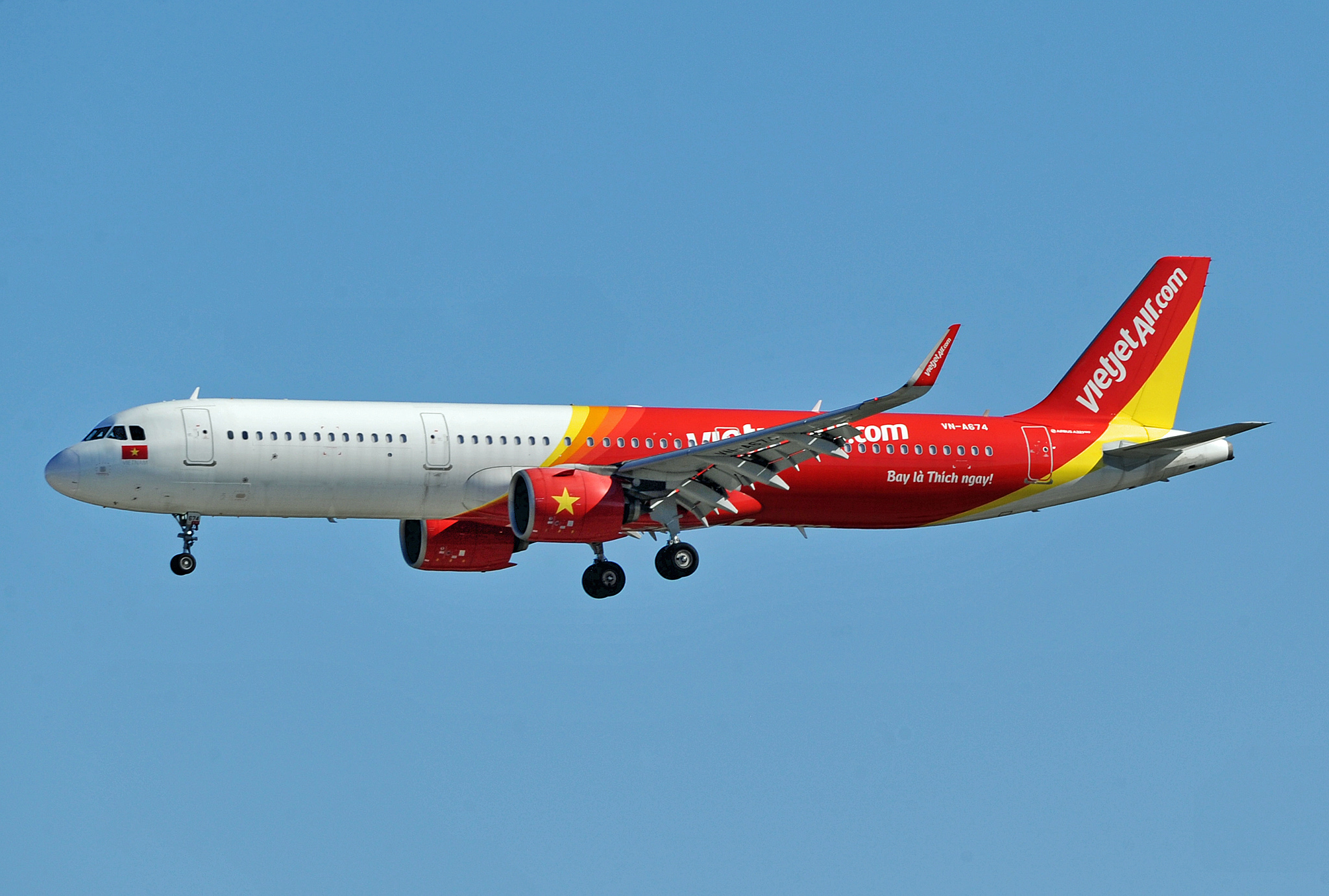
VietJet Air Airbus A321neo

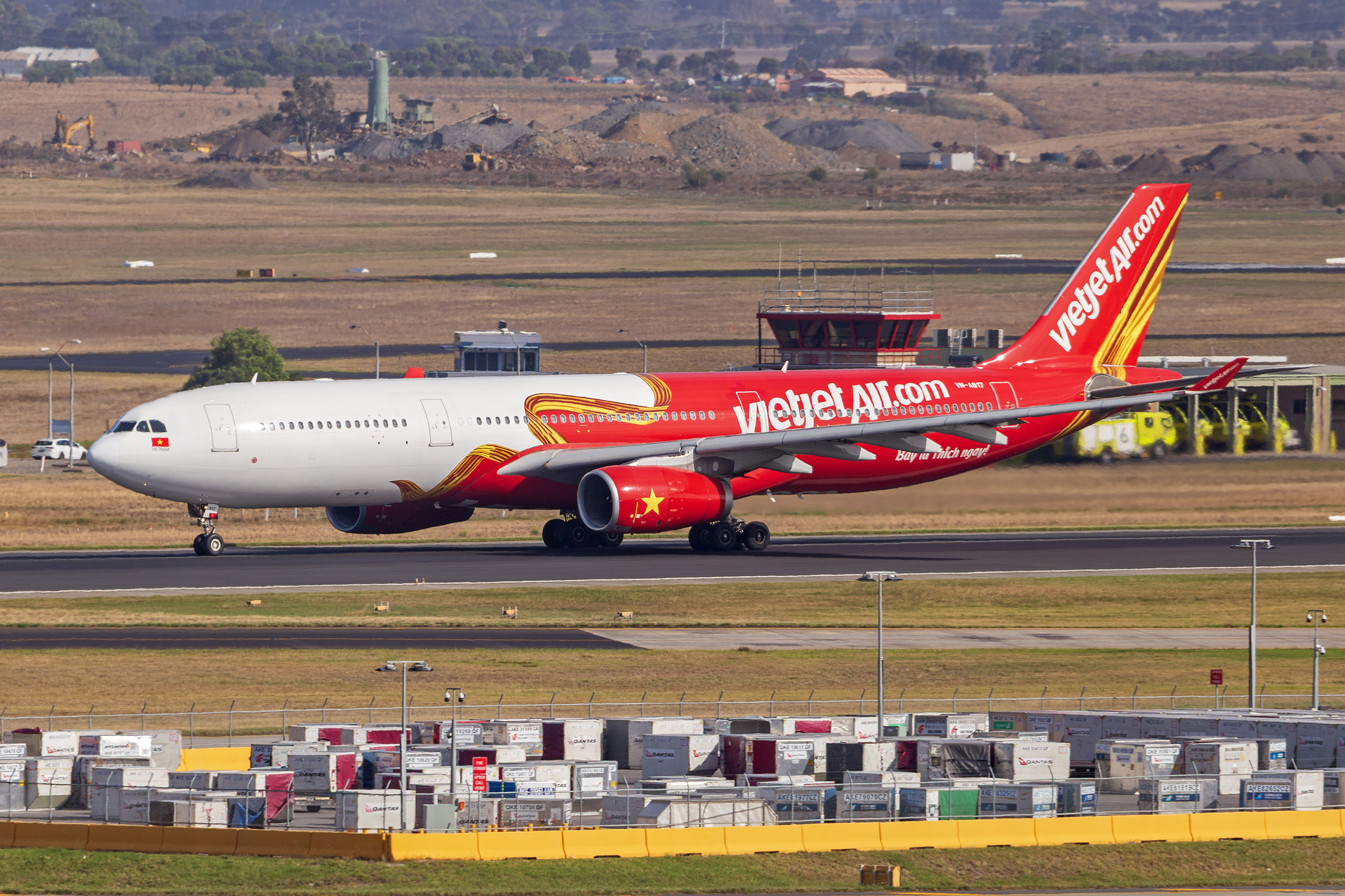
VietJet Air A330-300

=== Current fleet ===
As of July 2026, VietJet Air operates the following aircraft:

VietJet Air fleet
Aircraft	In service	Orders	Passengers				Notes
Aircraft	In service	Orders	J	W	Y	Total	Notes
Airbus A320-200	16	—	—	—	180	180	
Airbus A321-200	6	—	—	—	220	220	
Airbus A321-200	30	—	—	—	230	230	
Airbus A321neo	11	168	—	—	230	230	Some of its fleet were grounded for engine inspection.
Airbus A321neo	32	168	—	—	240	240	Equipped with Airbus Cabin Flex configuration.
Airbus A321XLR	—	20	TBA				
Airbus A330-300	8	—	12	—	365	377	Former AirAsia X and Corsair airframes. To be replaced by the Airbus A330neo.
Airbus A330-900	—	40	—	56	330	389	Deliveries from 2026. To replace the Airbus A330-300.
Boeing 737 MAX 8	—	30	TBA				Additional 50 ordered for subsidiary Thai VietJet Air and a further 20 for Qazaqstan.
Boeing 737 MAX 200	—	100	TBA				
Comac C909	2	10	—	—	90	90	To be dry-leased from SPDB.
Total	104	368					

=== Fleet development ===
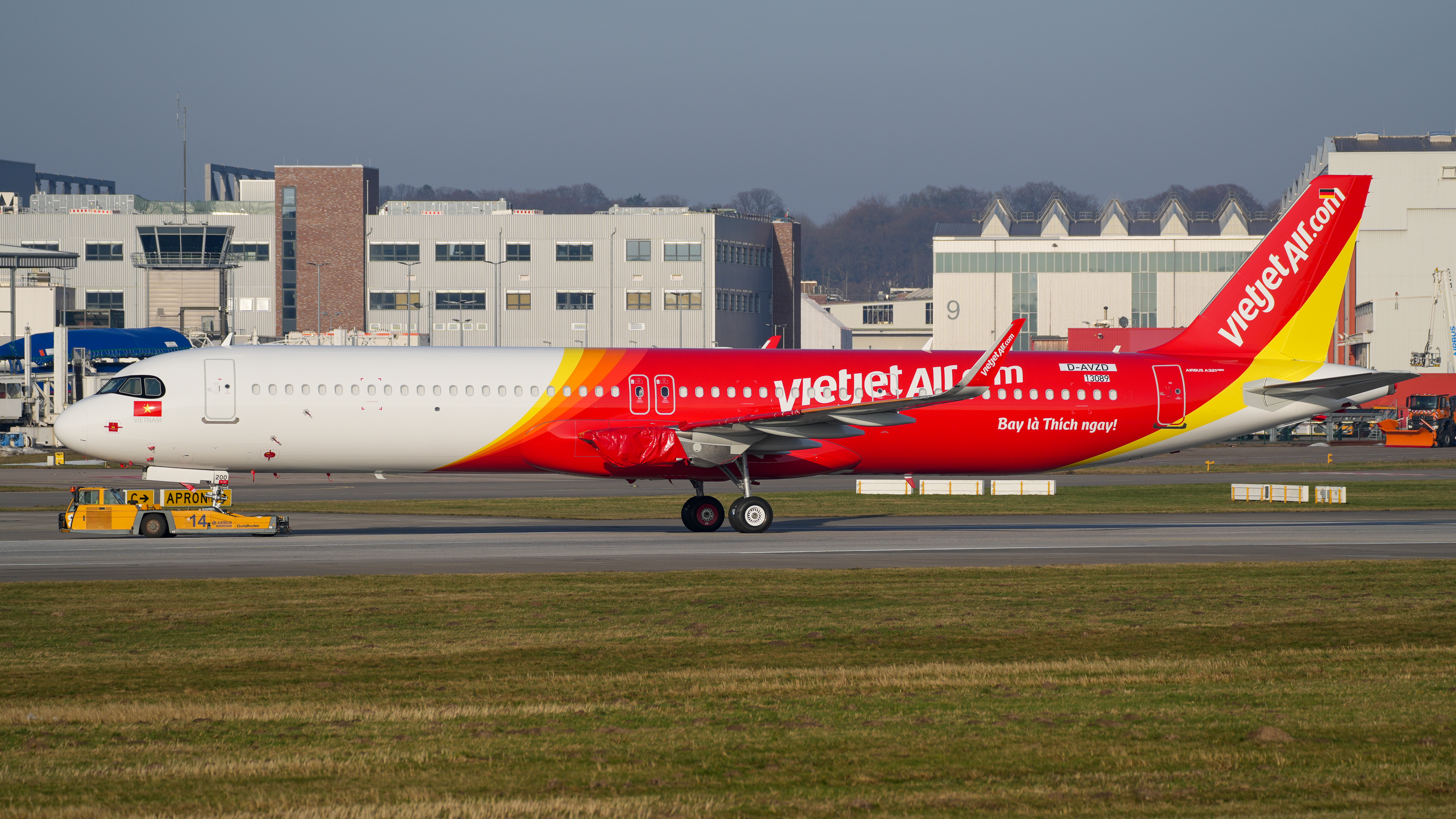
A VietJet's brand new Airbus A321neo during its final assembly at Hamburg Finkenwerder, early 2026.

On February 26, 2019, VietJet Air signed a memorandum of understanding with Boeing, an American aircraft manufacturer, to purchase 100 Boeing 737 MAX 200 aircraft. The signing ceremony took place at the Presidential Palace in Hanoi, Vietnam, in the presence of Vietnamese President Nguyen Phu Trong and U.S. President Donald Trump.

In December 2019, VietJet Air had one of its first Boeing 737 MAX 200 aircraft rolled out from the Boeing factory. However, the plane was not taken up afterwards and was delivered to Akasa Air.

On July 23, 2024, at the Farnborough International Airshow, VietJet Air and Airbus officially finalized a deal worth $7.4 billion for 20 Airbus A330-900 aircraft, following a signed Memorandum of Understanding (MoU) for the purchase back in February 2024 at the Singapore Airshow. It is the airline's first-ever widebody order. They will replace the carrier's current wide-body fleet of 7 leased Airbus A330-300 aircraft, as well as providing for network expansion.

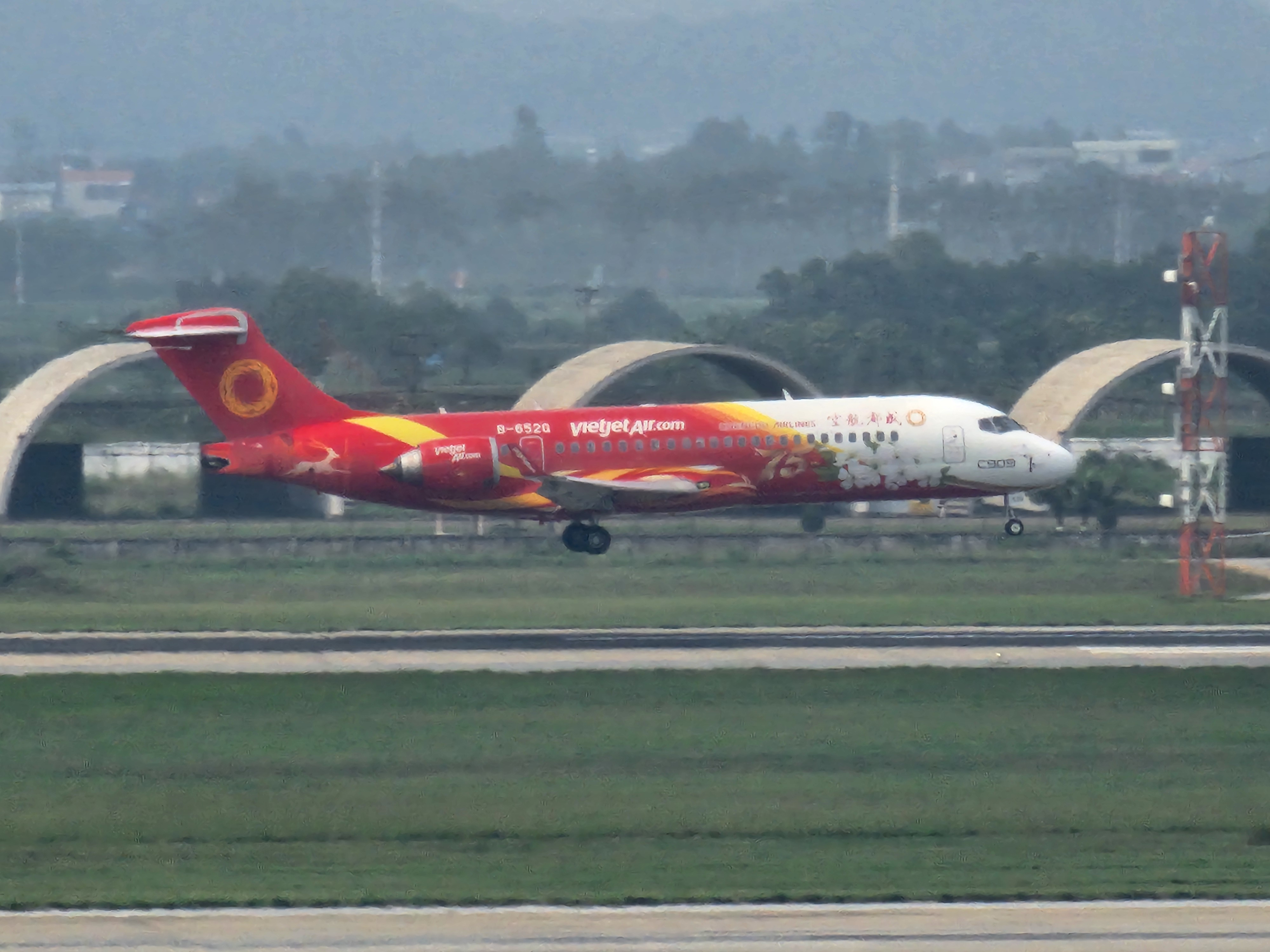
A Chengdu-VietJet C909 at Noi Bai in 2025.

Between April and October 2025, Vietjet operated two Comac C909 wet-leased from Chengdu Airlines on a 6-month contract, marking the first time Chinese jets were used for domestic flights in Vietnam. The lease was later renewed in November 2025.

On June 17, 2025, at the Paris Airshow, VietJet and Airbus announced a Memorandum of Understanding (MoU) for 100 Airbus A321neo jets with an additional 50 options available for purchase at a later date.

== Accidents and incidents ==
Since commencing operations, VietJet Air has only suffered non-fatal incidents:

- June 19, 2014: VietJet Air Flight 8861 from Hanoi to Da Lat mistakenly landed at Cam Ranh International Airport. The reason was revealed to be pilot error. There were two flights, one from Hanoi to Nha Trang and the other from Hanoi to Da Lat, but one of the aircraft experienced technical difficulties and the aircraft was switched to another. Everyone was informed except for the captain of the flight. Everyone involved was suspended for further investigation.
- October 16, 2014: VietJet Air Flight 8856 departing from Ho Chi Minh City to Nha Trang landed on the wrong runway. The ATC repeatedly told the pilot to land on runway 02L, the pilot also repeated the messages correctly but later landed on runway 20R. The captain and the first officer were suspended.
- April 2, 2015: a disabled passenger flying back to Hanoi from Da Nang was denied service by two VietJet employees, citing being "unable to move by herself" and "did not notify the ground crew at the airport in time". The carrier later had to publicly apologize to the passenger and fined each employee VND5 million.
- September 30, 2015: VietJet Air Flight 496, an Airbus A320-200 (registered VN-A650) suffered a bird strike incident while on approach to Noi Bai International Airport. The aircraft from Buon Ma Thuot Airport landed safely on runway 07R. The aircraft's nose radome sustained substantial damage.
- January 28, 2018: VietJet caused some controversy by putting models wearing bikinis on the flight bringing the Vietnam U-23 football team home. VietJet CEO Nguyễn Thị Phương Thảo later publicly apologized.
- September 7, 2018: VietJet Air Flight 1848 from Hanoi to Taichung flew through a hailstorm, causing damage to the cockpit window. The flight was forced to return to Hanoi.
- November 29, 2018: VietJet Air Flight 356, a newly delivered Airbus A321neo (registered VN-A653), suffered a hard landing at Buon Ma Thuot Airport after arriving from Tan Son Nhat International Airport. The aircraft lost both tires on the nose gear. Six passengers were injured. The aircraft was later grounded, pending investigation and repairs. The pilots were later fired and suspended by the Civil Aviation Authority. The aircraft was eventually repaired.
- July 12, 2019: VietJet Air Flight 615 from Nha Trang to Ho Chi Minh City entered a wrong taxiway upon landing, forcing an approaching aircraft to go-around. The incident is under investigation by the Aviation Authority.
- June 14, 2020: VietJet Air Flight 322 from Phu Quoc to Ho Chi Minh City skidded off the runway during landing at Tan Son Nhat International Airport, causing delays to other flights. Passengers on this flight were later evacuated. No one was injured. The airline said heavy rain due to Tropical Storm Nuri was the cause of this incident.
- December 4, 2024: VietJet Air flight VJ82, An Airbus A330 from Melbourne to Ho Chi Minh City was forced to return to Melbourne after experiencing a serious drop in altitude with technical issues onboard. The aircraft then circled around the area to dump fuel for roughly 5 and a half hours before landing back at Melbourne for an emergency landing. Nobody was harmed during the flight.

== See also ==
- Thai VietJet Air
- VietJet Qazaqstan
