= Phạm Nhật Vượng =

Vietnamese businessman (born 1968)

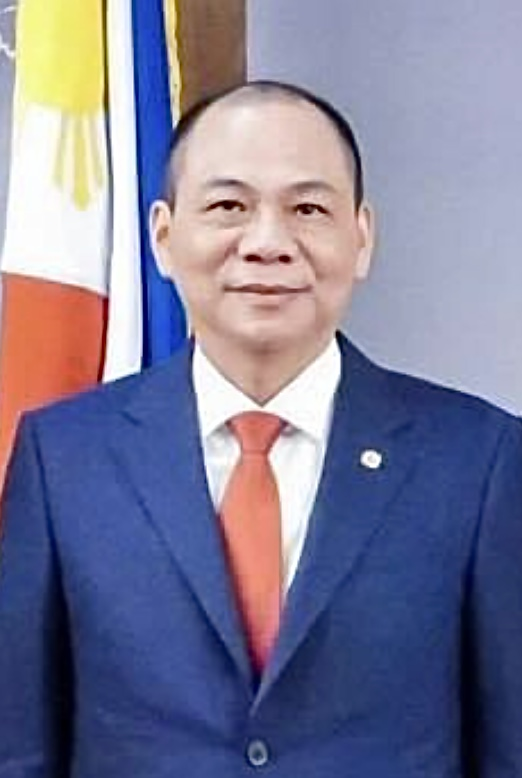
- Vượng in 2024.
- Born: 5 August 1968 (age 58); Haiphong, North Vietnam
- Education: Hanoi University of Mining and Geology; Moscow Geological Prospecting Institute
- Occupation: Property developer
- Organisation: Vingroup
- Known for: The first Vietnamese billionaire, richest Vietnamese, founder and chairman of Vingroup, CEO of VinFast
- Children: Phạm Nhật Quân Anh, Phạm Nhật Minh Hoàng (sons), Phạm Nhật Minh Anh (daughter)

Phạm Nhật Vượng (Vietnamese pronunciation: [fâːm ɲʌ̂t vɯɤ̂ŋ], born 5 August 1968) is a Vietnamese property developer and Vietnam's first USD billionaire. He is the founder and chairman of Vingroup, the largest conglomerate in Vietnam, and the creator and former owner of Mivina, one of the most popular brands of instant noodles in Ukraine. As of April 2026, Vượng had a net worth of $34.1 billion according to Forbes.

== Personal life ==
Vượng was born on 5 August 1968 in Hanoi; his paternal family has origins in Hà Tĩnh in north-central Vietnam. His father served in the Vietnamese Army's air defence division, and his mother is from Haiphong, who had a tea shop, which left the family with a very meager income. He grew up in Hanoi and graduated from Kim Liên High School in 1985.

In 1987, he entered Hanoi University of Mining and Geology and was sent to the Soviet Union to study in the Moscow Geological Prospecting Institute, for which he was able to obtain a scholarship thanks to his mathematical abilities. He graduated from this university in 1992.

After graduating, he married Phạm Thu Hương, whom he had known since high school, and moved to Kharkiv, Ukraine where he lived in the early 1990s. The couple has three children.

== Career ==
In the 1990s, while living in Ukraine, Phạm Nhật Vượng started an instant noodle restaurant business using money borrowed from friends and family. Soon he also started producing and selling instant noodles. This Mivina brand of instant noodles became popular with Ukrainians during the lean post-communist years of the 1990s.

In 1993, he founded Technocom, which would become successful in dehydrated culinary products in Ukraine. Vượng sold Technocom to Nestlé for $150 million in 2009, before returning to Vietnam.

Vượng's first projects in Vietnam were Vinpearl Resort Nha Trang (opened in 2003) and Vincom City Towers (later renamed Vincom Ba Trieu) in central Hanoi (opened in 2004). Vincom went public in 2007. It merged with Vinpearl, Vượng's luxury resort business, to form VinGroup in 2007. VinGroup is headquartered in its Riverside township in Long Biên District in Eastern Hanoi.

In 2015, Vượng was listed as the richest person in Vietnam with assets totalling VNĐ 24.3 trillion (approximately US$1.1 billion), which more than quadrupled those of the second richest person, Trần Đình Long of Hanoi Hoa Phat Corporation. His wife, Phạm Thu Hương, ranked third, and his sister-in-law Phạm Thúy Hằng ranked fifth.

Vượng took on the role of CEO of VinFast in January 2024.

In May 2025 his net worth totaled nearly 180 trillion dong.
