= Air transport in Vietnam =

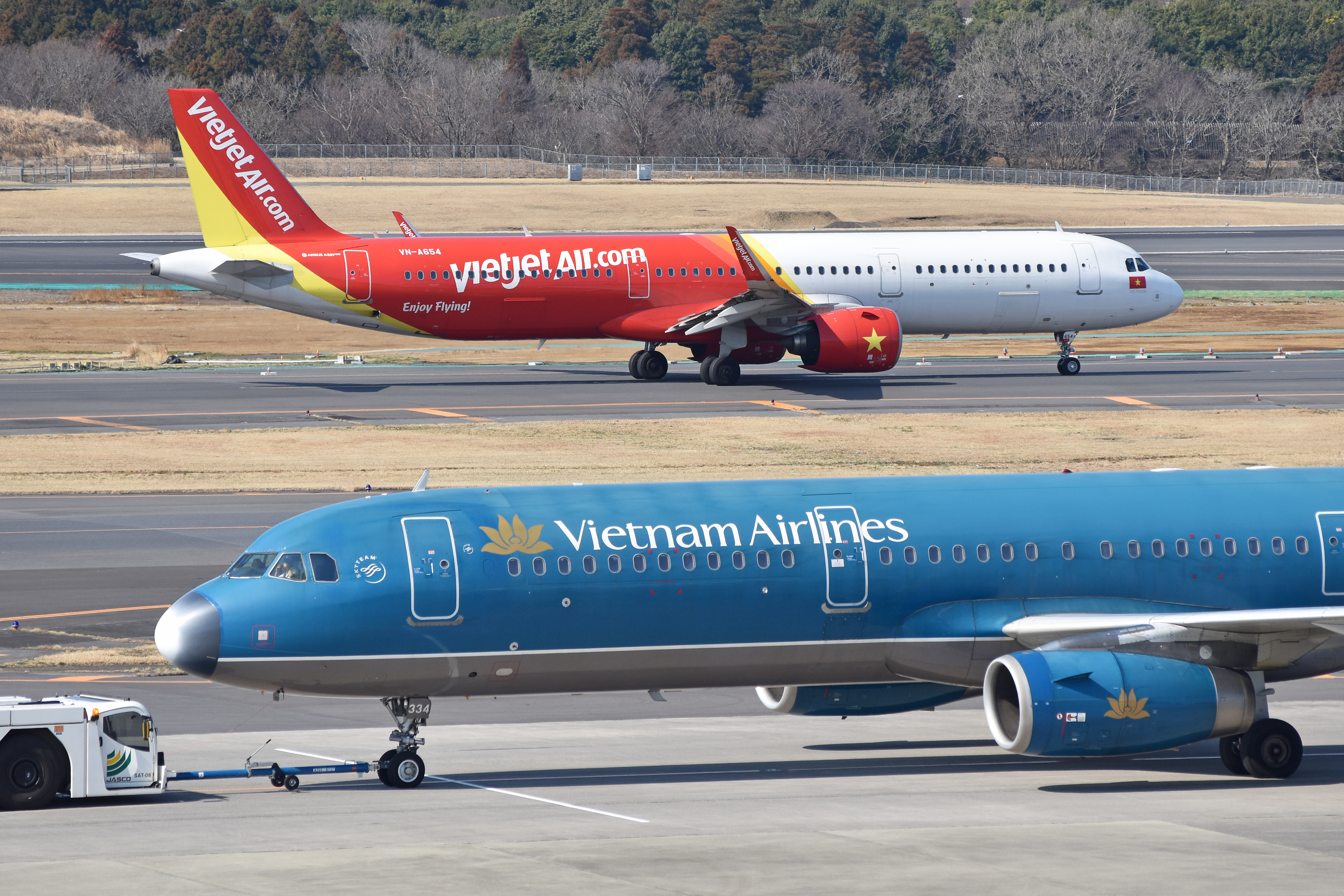
Vietnam Airlines and VietJet Air are the largest full-service carrier and low-cost airline in Vietnam, respectively

Air transport in Vietnam is the commercial air transport of passengers, freight and mail within Vietnam and between Vietnam and the rest of the world. The government's Civil Aviation Administration of Vietnam, the civil aviation authority under the Ministry of Transport, oversees the operations of aviation activities in the country.

== History ==
Air transport in Vietnam started with the founding of the Vietnam Civil Aviation in January 1956 by the Vietnam People's Air Force (Ministry of Defense), upon the issuance of Decision No.666/TTG of the Vietnamese government. The authority was originally tasked with state management, national defense, and commercialization of air transportation. The aviation sector expanded greatly during its formative years, expanding from a few aircraft in what was then North Vietnam to eventually include a fleet of over 50 aircraft (including both Soviet- and US-made) in a unified Vietnam after 1976. Infrastructure was improved during this time, as airports country-wide were equipped with better facilities and materials for flight management and operations. CAAV grew to serve around 250,000 passengers a year, both domestically and on international routes to China, Laos, Cambodia and Thailand.

On 9 December 2004, United Airlines made history when its Boeing 747-400 landed in Ho Chi Minh City. Flight UA869 took off from San Francisco at 12:10 pm, and made an en route stop at Hong Kong for two hours, before setting off again. The 747, which carried 260 passengers, touched down at 10:06 pm, ending a 29-year absence of US commercial flights since the Fall of Saigon on 30 April 1975.

=== Future ===
According to the International Air Transport Association (IATA), Vietnam is projected to be the third fastest-growing market for freight and international passengers behind the People's Republic of China and the United Arab Emirates, at 10.2% annually until 2014. Domestically, Vietnam will have the second fastest-growing passenger market behind China.

== Airlines ==
As of 2010, seven domestic and 47 foreign airlines operate within, to and from Vietnam.

=== Vietnam Airlines ===
Vietnam Airlines is the country's national flag carrier. It operates approximately 70 aircraft, serving 46 destinations from its hubs at Noi Bai and Tan Son Nhat International Airports. The airline and its affiliate, VASCO, makes up 80% of the domestic aviation market. Vietnam Airlines is a member of SkyTeam, an airline alliance, which it joined in June 2010. Vietnam Airlines currently has plans to launch flights to Doha, Mumbai, Brisbane, and most importantly, the United States. Although there has been a long-standing plan to launch flights to the US West Coast, it has been postponed due mainly to the stringent requirement that must be met, which the airline is currently working towards.

=== Pacific Airlines ===
Pacific Airlines is the second largest domestic carrier behind Vietnam Airlines. Based in Ho Chi Minh City, the airline operates approximately 7 aircraft, with which it provides services to 7 destinations within Vietnam. It changed its name to Jetstar Pacific after Qantas of Australia bought 18% of shares, thereby integrating it into the Jetstar low-cost carrier network. By 2010, Jetstar Pacific controlled 20% of the domestic market share. After Qantas sold its 30% shareholding in July 2020, it resumed trading as Pacific Airlines.

=== VietJet Air ===
VietJet Air is the first low-cost airlines in Vietnam. Launched at the end of 2009, Vietjet Air is now even larger than Jetstar Pacific Airlines. Vietjet Air operates flights to 17 airports in Vietnam and to 13 airports in other countries.

=== Hai Au Aviation ===
Established in 2011, Hai Au Aviation operates Cessna 208 Caravan seaplanes on scenic flights.

== Airports and infrastructure ==
There are 22 airports in operations throughout Vietnam, of which 9 are international. Tan Son Nhat International Airport, Noi Bai International Airport and Da Nang International Airport are the major gateways, handling most of international flights. A new airport is currently being built, Long Thanh International Airport, also serving Ho Chi Minh City.
