= List of airlines of Vietnam =

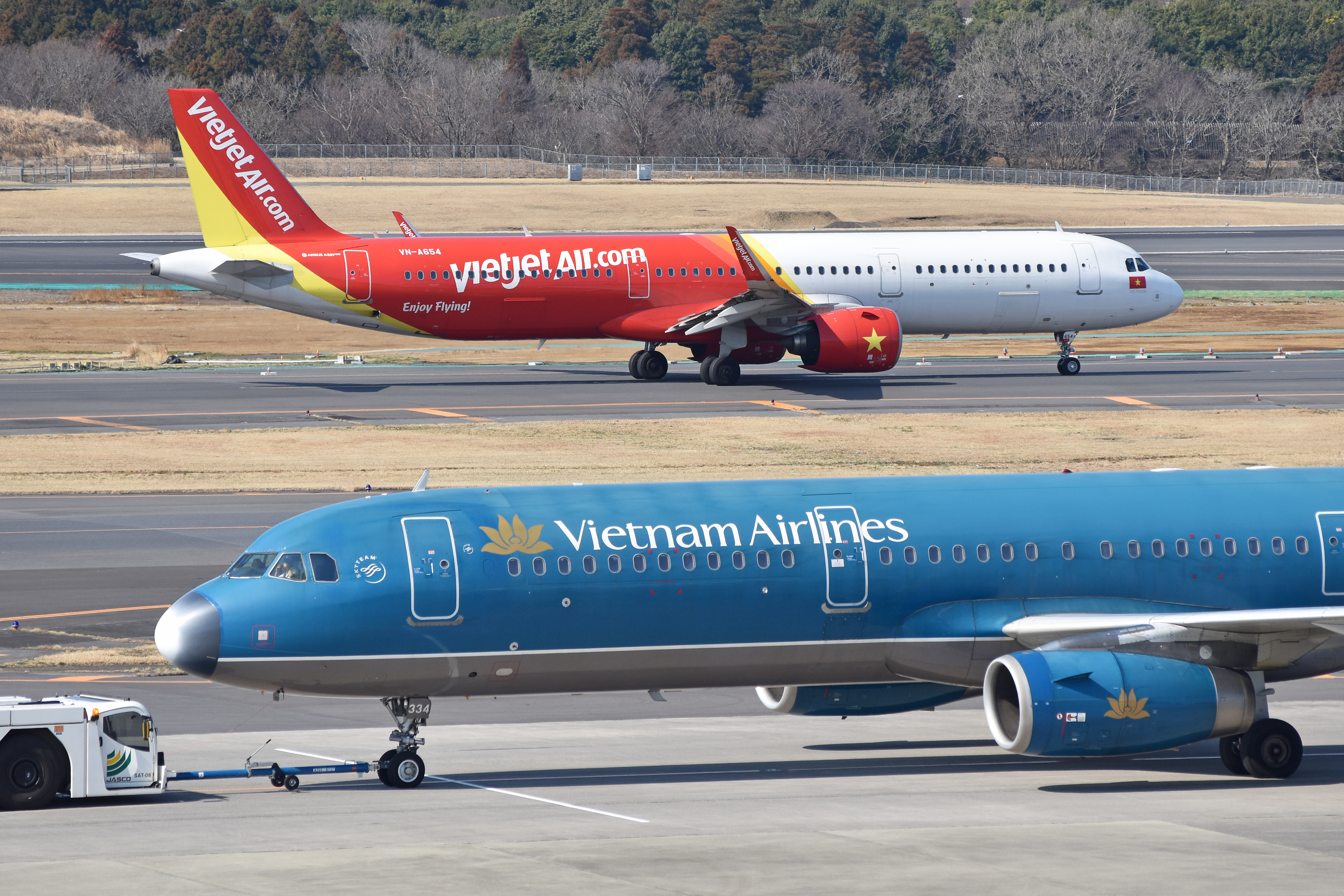
Vietnam Airlines and VietJet Air are the two carriers dominating the Vietnamese aviation market.

This is a list of airlines in Vietnam, as approved by the Civil Aviation Authority of Vietnam (CAAV).

== Scheduled airlines ==
Airline	Image	IATA	ICAO	Callsign	Commenced operations	Notes
Pacific Airlines		BL	PIC	PACIFIC AIRLINES	1991	Low-cost carrier, renamed from Jetstar Pacific Airlines to Pacific Airlines in 2020
Sun PhuQuoc Airways		9G	SPQ	SUN LUX	2025	Leisure/Full-service carrier
VietJet Air		VJ	VJC	VIETJETAIR	2011	Low-cost carrier
Vietnam Air Services Company		0V	VFC	VASCO AIR	2004	Regional carrier, division of Vietnam Airlines. Operations also include charter flights, medical evacuations, SAR operations, oil platforms flights, and other aviation services.
Vietnam Airlines		VN	HVN	VIET NAM AIRLINES	1976	State-owned national flag carrier
Vietravel Airlines		VU	VAG	VIETRAVEL AIR	2020	Leisure/Low-cost carrier

== Charter airlines ==
Airline	Image	IATA	ICAO	Callsign	Commenced operations	Notes
Vietnam Helicopter Corporation				VIETNAM HELICOPTER	1989	Charter helicopter carrier.
Vietstar Airlines			VSM	VIETSTAR	2020	Co-founded by the Vietnamese Air Force. AOC applied in 2016.
Hai Au Aviation		HA	HAI	unknown	2014	Former seaplanes operator.
Sun Air			SAV	SUN AIR	2022	Owned by Sun Group.

== See also ==
- List of airlines
- List of defunct airlines of Vietnam
- List of airports in Vietnam
- List of defunct airlines of Asia
