= List of defunct airlines of Vietnam =

This is a list of defunct airlines of Vietnam, including North Vietnam and South Vietnam.

Airline	Image	Commenced operations	Ceased operations	Notes
Aigle-Azur Extrême-Orient		1956	1960	Aigle Azur subsidiary
Aigle-Azur Indochine		1949	1956	Aigle Azur subsidiary renamed Aigle-Azur Extrême-Orient
Air Mekong		2010	2014	
Air Vietnam		1951	1975	Flag carrier of South Vietnam. Ceased operations after the Fall of Saigon. The airline's assets were incorporated into Vietnam Civil Aviation.
Bamboo Airways		2019	2026	
COSARA		1947	1954	
Vietnam Civil Aviation		1956	1993	Predecessor of Vietnam Airlines. Reorganized as the nation's aviation authority.
Indochina Airlines		2008	2009	
Trai Thien Air Cargo		2009	2011	No flights

== See also ==
- List of airlines of Vietnam
- List of airports in Vietnam
