= Trai Thien Air Cargo =

Vietnamese cargo airline

- Type: airline cargo
- Industry: airlines

Trãi Thiên Air Cargo was a Vietnamese cargo airline. The company headquartered in Tan Son Nhat International Airport, Ho Chi Minh City, Vietnam. The company received a license from the Civil Aviation Administration of Vietnam on 16 October 2009.

Before getting official approval, Prime Minister Nguyen Tan Dung agreed with the recommendation by the Ministry of Transport of Vietnam to allow Trãi Thiên to provide air cargo transport services.

Trãi Thiên Air Cargo focused on the domestic cargo market but the company wanted to operate the services between Noi Bai International Airport in Hanoi and Northeast Asia; between Tan Son Nhat International Airport in Ho Chi Minh City and Southeast Asia.

If operated as planned, it would have been the first Vietnamese private company licensed to provide air cargo transport services with 2 leased Boeing 737-300F.

The company is a branch of the Trãi Thiên Group, which was working to open an office in California to pave the way for its direct goods transport service between Vietnam and the U.S.

Despite an official start in June 2010, the company delayed the first revenue flights to early September, then to late November. Trai Thien's Deputy Director Le Giang Long admitted that the airline was already facing some financial difficulties, which led to the tardiness in paying salaries to labourers and finding new contracts.

On December 5, 2011, the Ministry of Transportation withdrew the operating license of Trai Thien, with not even a single cargo flight having ever taken off.
