= Pacific Airlines =

Low-cost airline of Vietnam

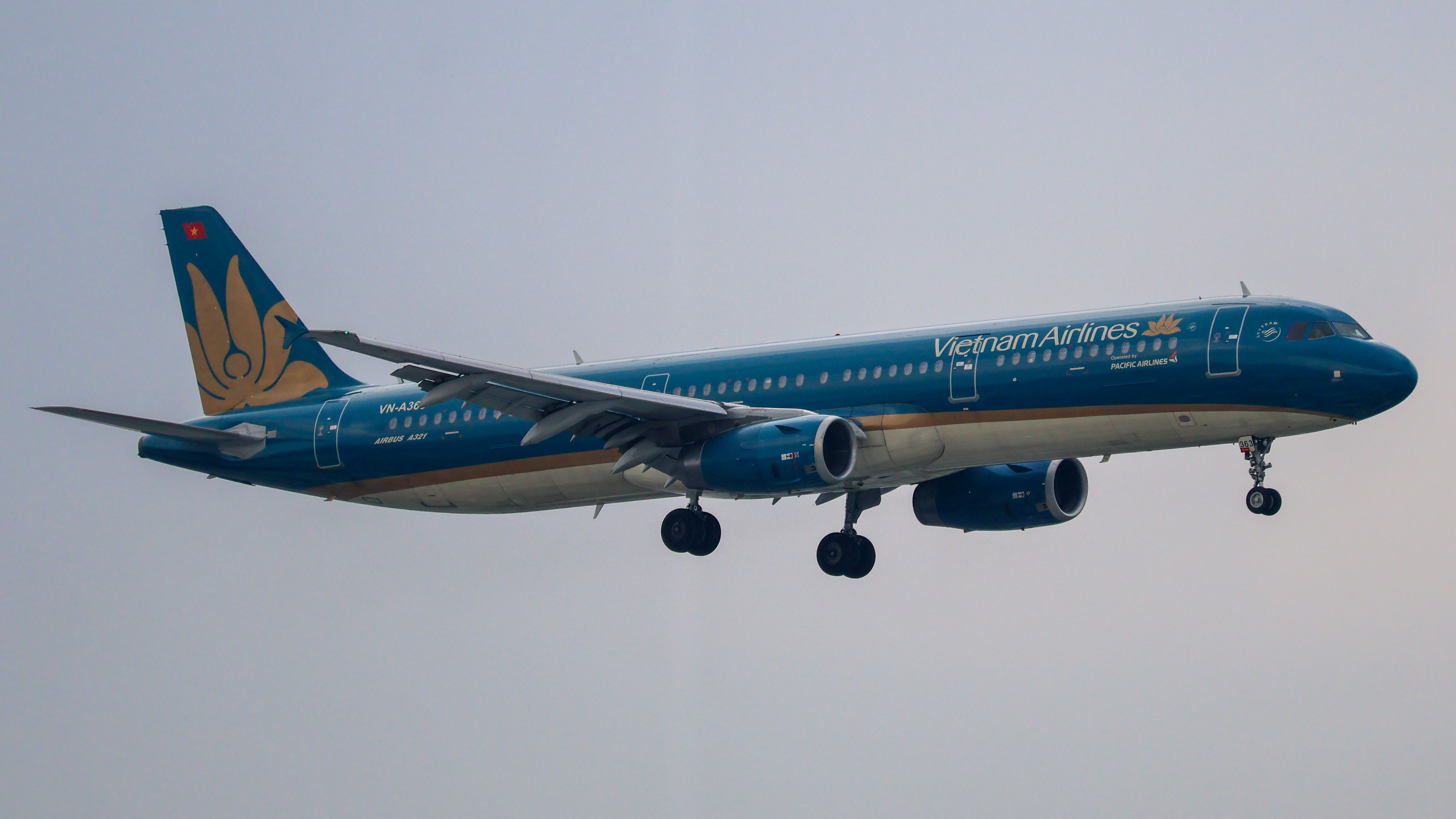
- Pacific Airlines is currently utilizing Vietnam Airlines aircraft for its operations.
IATA	ICAO	Call sign
BL	PIC	PACIFIC
- Founded: December 1990; 35 years ago
- Commenced operations: April 1991; 35 years ago
- Operating bases: Hanoi; Ho Chi Minh City
- Frequent-flyer program: Lotusmiles
- Fleet size: 1
- Destinations: 22
- Parent company: Vietnam Airlines (98%)
- Headquarters: Ho Chi Minh City, Vietnam
- Key people: Trịnh Hồng Quang (Chairman); Đinh Văn Tuấn (CEO)
- Website: pacificairlines.com.vn pacificairlines.com

Pacific Airlines Joint Stock Aviation Company (Vietnamese: Công ty Cổ phần Hàng không Pacific Airlines, operating as Pacific Airlines) is a low-cost airline and ground services provider headquartered in Tan Binh District, Ho Chi Minh City, Vietnam, with its primary operating base at Tan Son Nhat International Airport. From 2008 to 2020, it was known as Jetstar Pacific Airlines (as a subsidiary of Jetstar).

The airline began operations in 1991, flying chartered cargo services. From 1996 to 2005, the airline, along with other local companies, operated under the government-owned Vietnam Airlines Corporation. Having by now operated passenger services, Pacific Airlines then came under the control of the government itself. In 2007, the Vietnamese government sold a 30% shareholding to Qantas, and as such the airline adopted a low-cost operations model and adopted its name (Jetstar Pacific) on 23 May 2008, becoming part of the Jetstar network.

In February 2012, Vietnam Airlines bought a 70% stake in the company. As part of its expansion plan, it was intended that Jetstar Pacific will have up to 15 Airbus A320 aircraft by the end of 2015 and up to 30 aircraft by 2020. In late 2020, Qantas sold its stakes in Jetstar Pacific to Vietnam Airlines and the carrier returned to its old brand name,Pacific Airlines.

On 8 March 2024, Pacific Airlines temporarily suspended all of its services and flights and decommissioned its whole fleet, citing financial difficulties and pressure from lessors. The airline resumed its nominal operations on 26 June 2024 after a period of restructuring, using a single Vietnam Airlines aircraft.

== History ==
=== Early operations ===
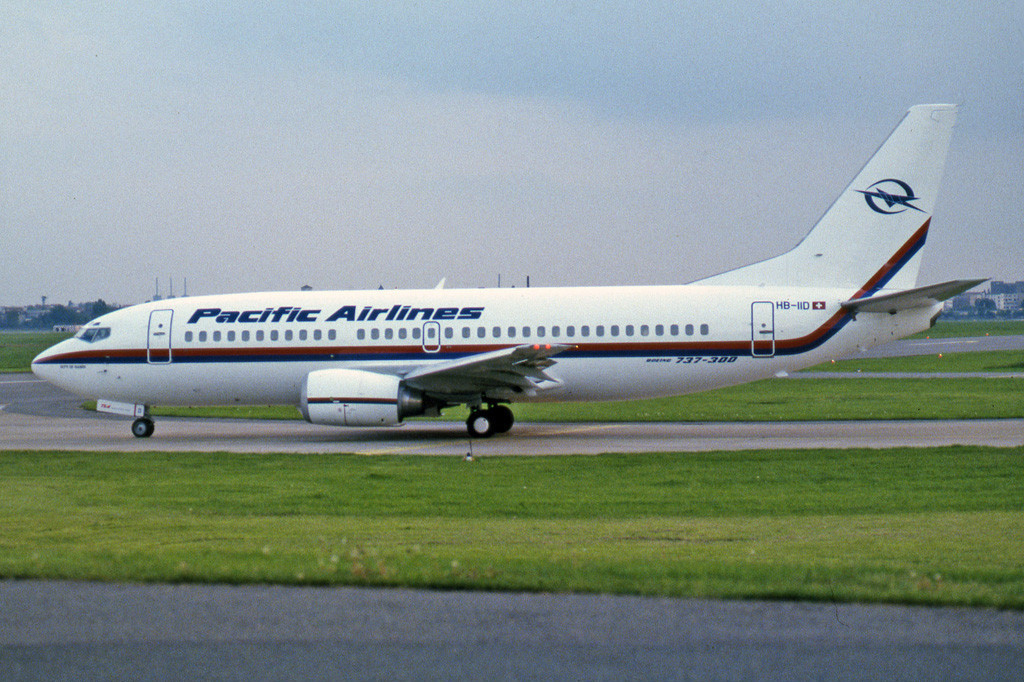
Pacific Airlines Boeing 737-300 in Berlin, 1996.

Pacific Airlines was established in December 1990 and began operations in April 1991 with a start-up capital of US$2.47 million. It was the first carrier to be established in Vietnam following reforms that permitted foreign investment in the country's airlines. Pacific Airlines operated chartered cargo flights to Thailand, Pakistan, and France in cooperation with AOM French Airlines. In 1993, prior to the lifting of the US embargo against Vietnam, the airline signed a deal with United Airlines that would have involved the training of Pacific Airlines' personnel and that had provisions for cooperation on US–Vietnam services.

In 1994, the Civil Aviation Authority of Vietnam (CAAV) proposed plans to the government about the possible trading of minority stakes of Vietnam Airlines, VASCO and Pacific Airlines to investors. With the lifting of the US embargo, the country was looking for funds for aircraft procurements. Such plans did not materialise. However, in 1996, Pacific Airlines was consolidated with several air-service companies, including Vietnam Airlines, to establish Vietnam Airlines Corporation. During the same year, Pacific Airlines wet-leased a Boeing 737-300 from Swiss charter carrier TEA Basel. In addition to its jointly serviced cargo destinations, Pacific had by now opened services to Hanoi, Hong Kong and Taipei.

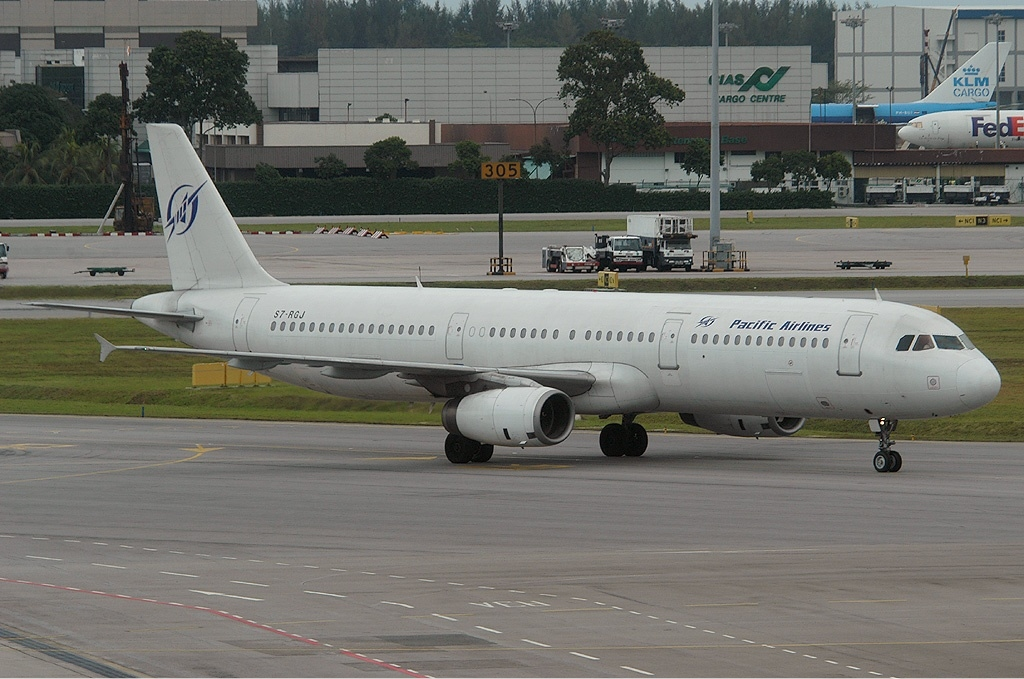
Pacific Airlines-colored A321-100 in 2003.

In 2000, Pacific entered into an agreement with Greek charter airline Galaxy Airways whereby the Vietnamese carrier would operate flights to Taipei on its behalf. In 2001, the airline's revenues totalled US$48 million, having made 3,600 flights using an Airbus A310 and two A321s. From 2001 to 2004, a succession of regional and global events, namely the September 11 attacks, the 2003 invasion of Iraq, the SARS outbreak and a rise in oil prices, as well as misguided management decisions, contributed to a cumulative loss of more than US$13 million at the airline. Consequently, Vietnam Airlines Corporation in late 2004 submitted a report about Pacific Airlines to the government, who decreed that all of the carrier's shares belonging to the corporation must be transferred to the Ministry of Finance (MoF). As a result, the MoF assumed control of 86.49% of shares, with Saigon Tourist (13.06%) and Tradevico (0.45%) making up the rest.

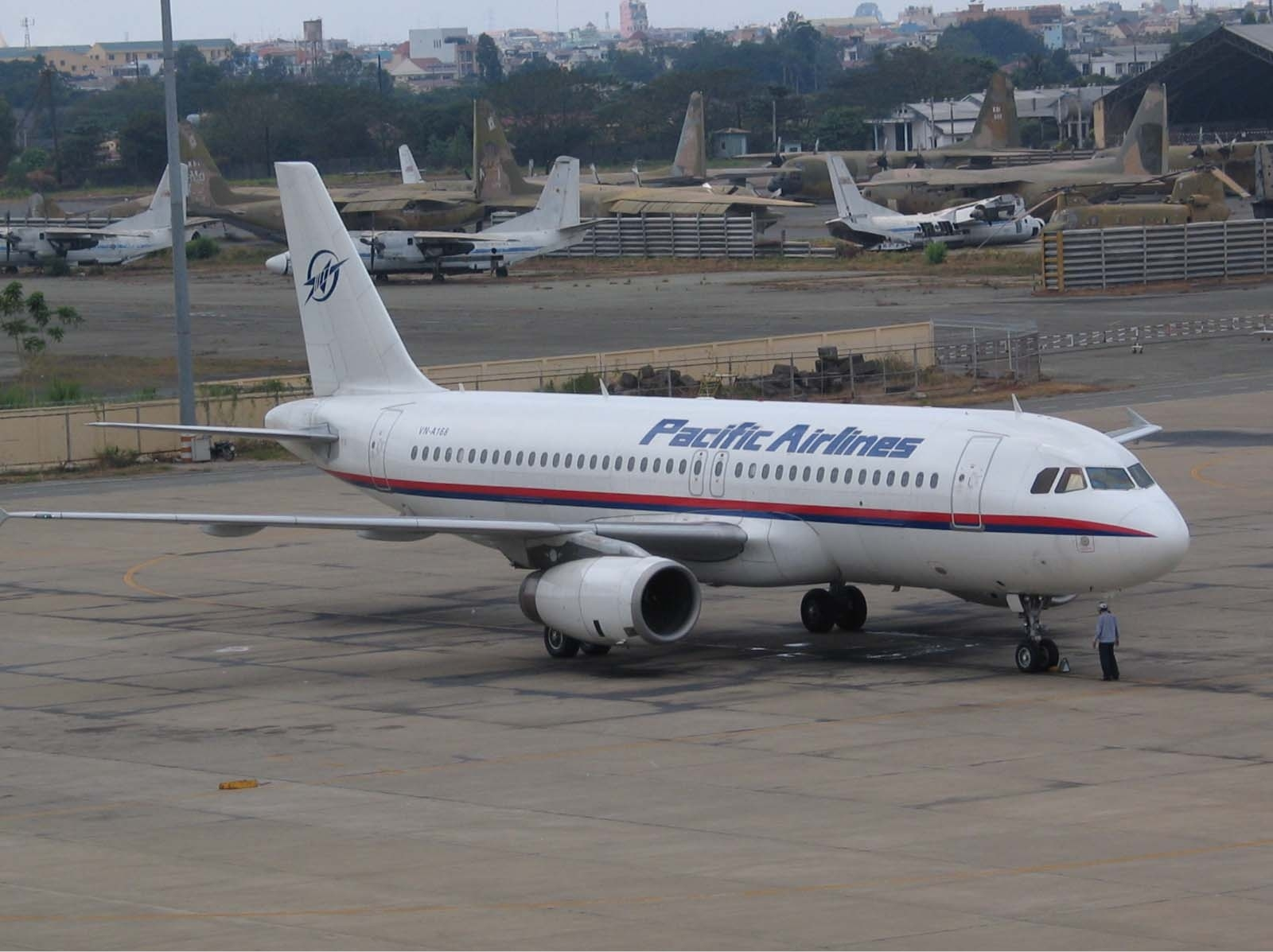
Pacific Airlines A320-200 in 2004. This aircraft was involved in an accident with another airline three years later.

The Ministry in January 2005 announced plans to sell all of its shares to increase the available capital by 20 times One prospective investor was Temasek Holdings, who was looking to inject US$50 million to revive the business, which might have entailed launching passenger flights to Japan, South Korea, Malaysia, Singapore and Thailand. Talks with various parties fell through. It was not until January 2007 when rumours circulated about another prospective investor.

=== Jetstar Pacific ===
Jetstar Pacific Airlines
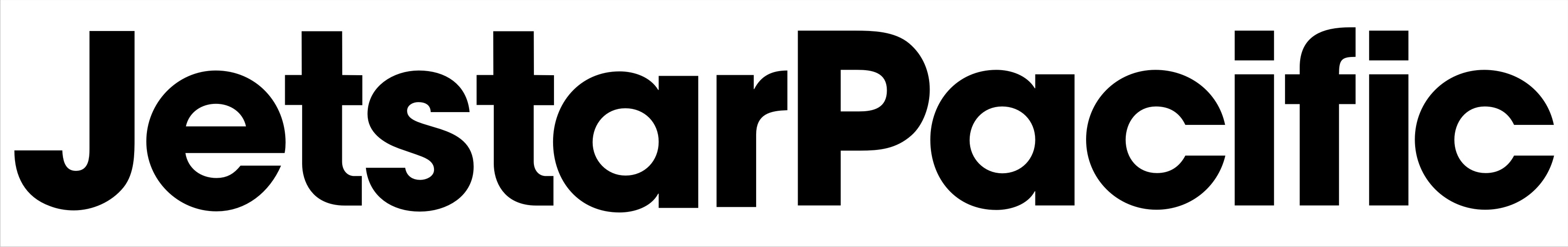

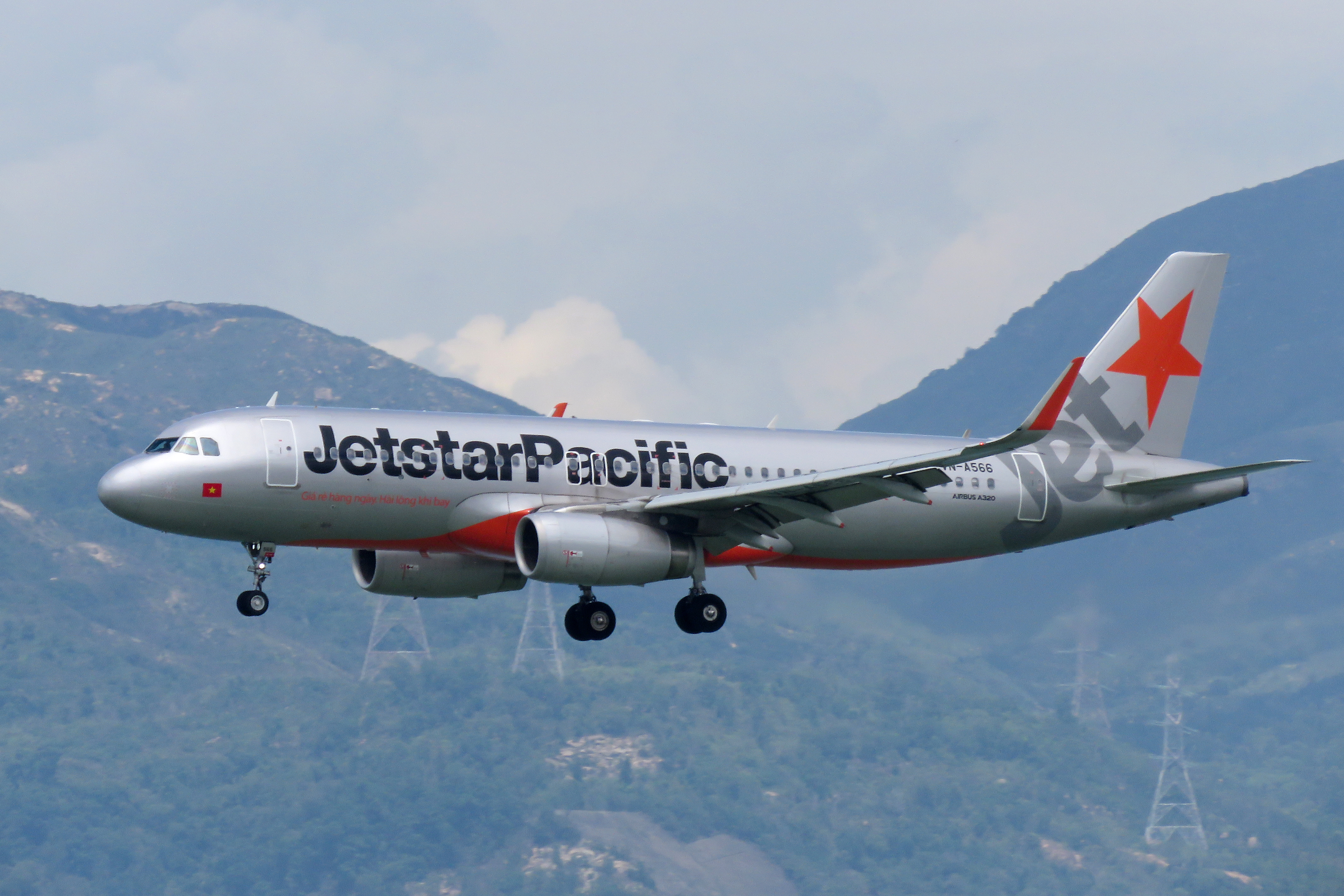
IATA	ICAO	Call sign
BL	PIC	PACIFIC EXPRESS
- Commenced operations: 23 May 2008 (as Jetstar Pacific)
- Ceased operations: 29 July 2020 (rebranded to Pacific Airlines)
- Operating bases: Hanoi; Ho Chi Minh City
- Fleet size: Up to 18
- Destinations: Up to 33
- Parent company: Vietnam Airlines
- Headquarters: Ho Chi Minh City, Vietnam
- Website: jetstar.com

Australian airline Qantas was in talks with the State Capital Investment Corporation (SCIC), who was then managing the government's stake in Pacific Airlines, about a possible investment in the carrier. Three months later, Qantas agreed to a minority stake in Pacific as part of its plan to expand its low-cost operations through Jetstar in Southeast Asia. The deal was finalised in July when Qantas acquired an 18% stake for US$30 million, with provisions to eventually increase the stake to 30%; SCIC held the majority of the remaining shares. The deal would see the carrier restructure as a low-cost airline and launch flights to the surrounding countries with a fleet of 30 Airbus A320s by 2014. It was renamed Jetstar Pacific Airlines (JPA, alternatively known as Jetstar Pacific) in May 2008.

JPA began its low-cost flights with service to Nha Trang and Da Nang. Due to high fuel costs, Nha Trang service was suspended, and the airline lost $22 million in 2008. Passenger service launches to Bangkok and Siem Reap were deferred, and SCIC stated the airline would need US$35 million to operate in 2009.

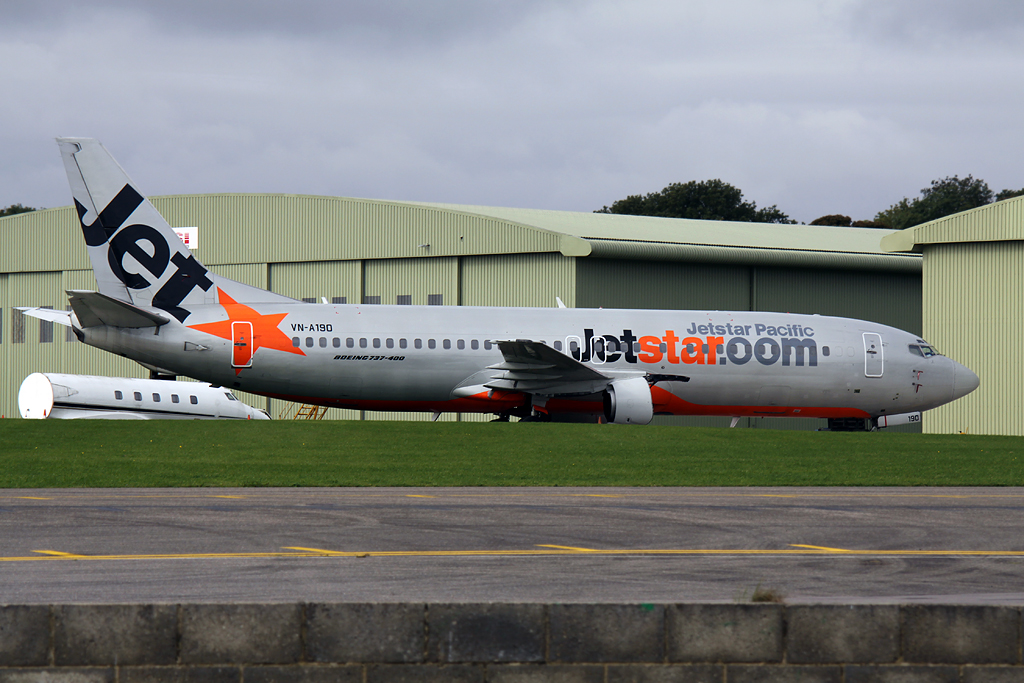
A retired Boeing 737-400 of Jetstar Pacific. All JPA Boeing 737 airframes were retired by 2013 as a part of the carrier's fleet modernisation.

Jetstar Pacific embarked on its fleet modernisation plan in 2009, as it replaced several Boeing 737-400s with leased A320s. It made its first profit (US$1.1 million) in July that year after long periods of losses. The airline expanded its domestic market share as it transported more than 1.5 million passengers in the first half of 2009. Despite these developments, the airline encountered branding issues when the CAAV in October decreed that it must replace its Jetstar brand and logo with a new identity; the CAAV cited possible consumer confusion with Jetstar Airways and that a foreign airline could potentially exploit the Jetstar Pacific's branding to advertise it products. Later that year, CEO Luong Hoai Nam suddenly quit the airline having served since 2004.

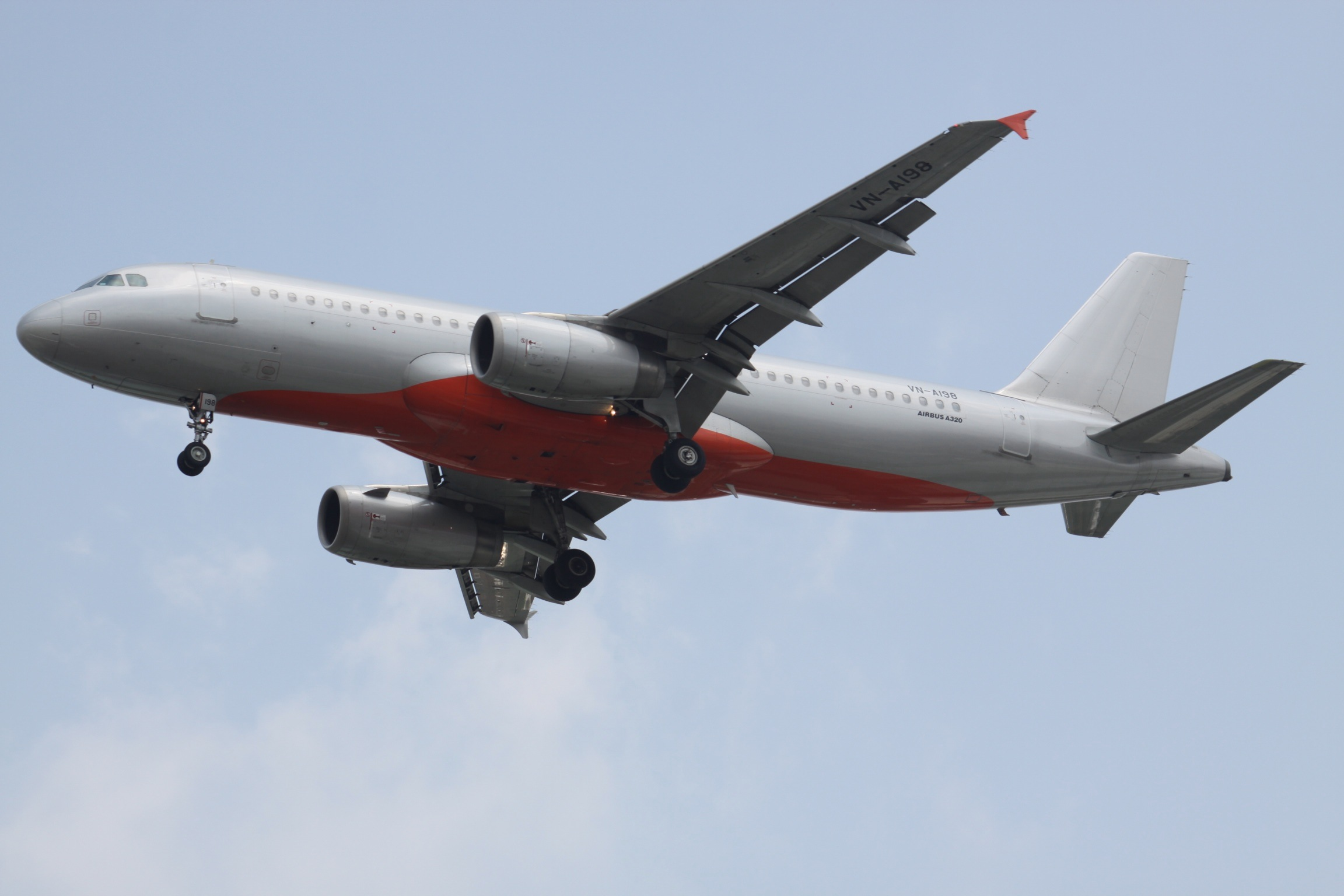
An early Jetstar Pacific A320 that had to be operated with a plain-gray livery due to the branding issues.

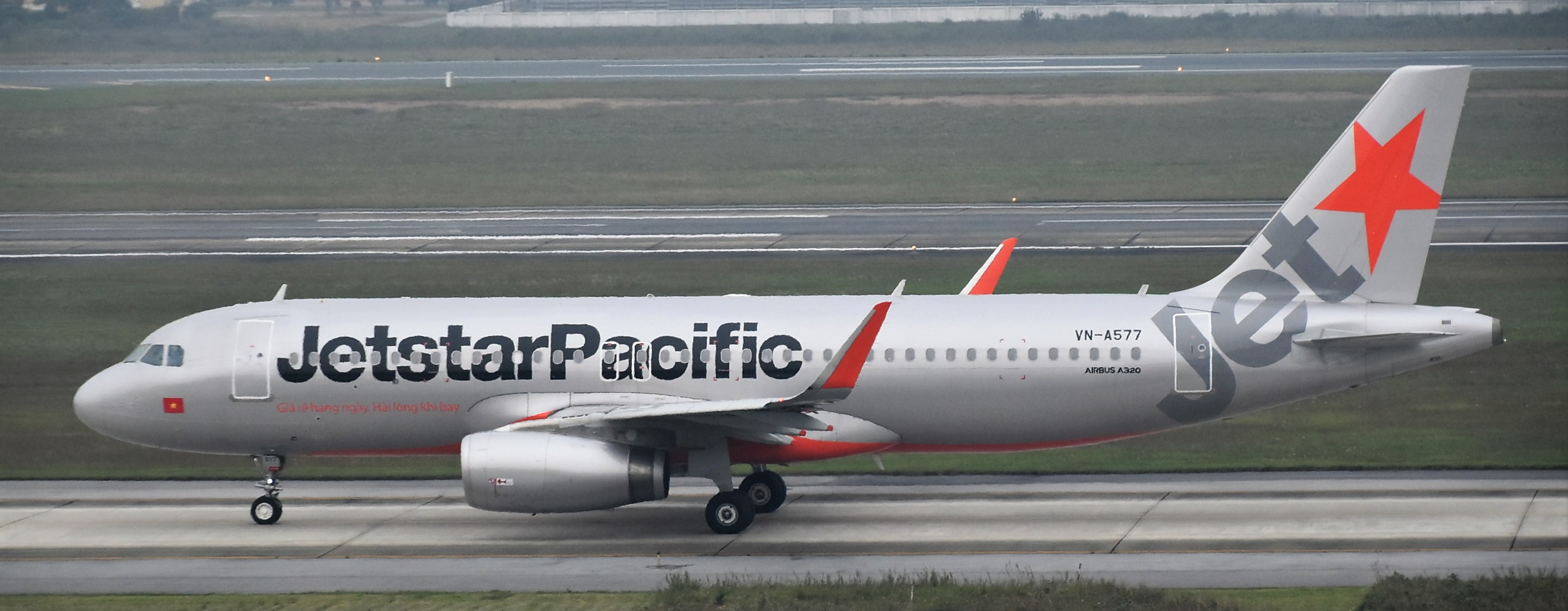
The standard Jetstar Pacific livery featured on an Airbus A320 Sharklets. Note that it was slightly modified compared to the standard Jetstar branding in order to address the concerns of the Vietnamese authorities.

In January 2010, clarifications about Nam surfaced when Vietnamese authorities reportedly detained the former CEO and prevented COO Daniela Masilli and CFO Tristan Freeman from leaving the country. This was part of an investigation into fuel hedging losses, which reportedly had cost the airline US$31 million. Qantas responded to the complication by replacing the two administrators. Due to the investigation into fuel-hedging allegations, growth plans at the airline were stalled.

Funding issues persisted through 2011. In addition to the fuel price fluctuations, compounded by the government-sanctioned fare cap, JPA had to address lease and maintenance fees for its aircraft. During the year, reports indicated that VAC would re-assume control of the carrier; according to Saigon Tiep Thi, the SCIC would transfer 70% of its shares to Vietnam Airlines. However, Jetstar denied such speculation. On 16 January 2012, the Vietnamese government confirmed the allegations by Saigon Tiep Thi by decreeing a transfer of SCIC shares to Vietnam Airlines, which took place in February. The transfer brought forward plans by Vietnam Airlines to have its own LCC by 2014. As part of its current expansion plan, it is intended that Jetstar Pacific will have up to 15 Airbus A320s by the end of 2015. The remaining 30% of Jetstar Pacific was held by Qantas (most likely for naming rights).

=== Return as Pacific Airlines ===
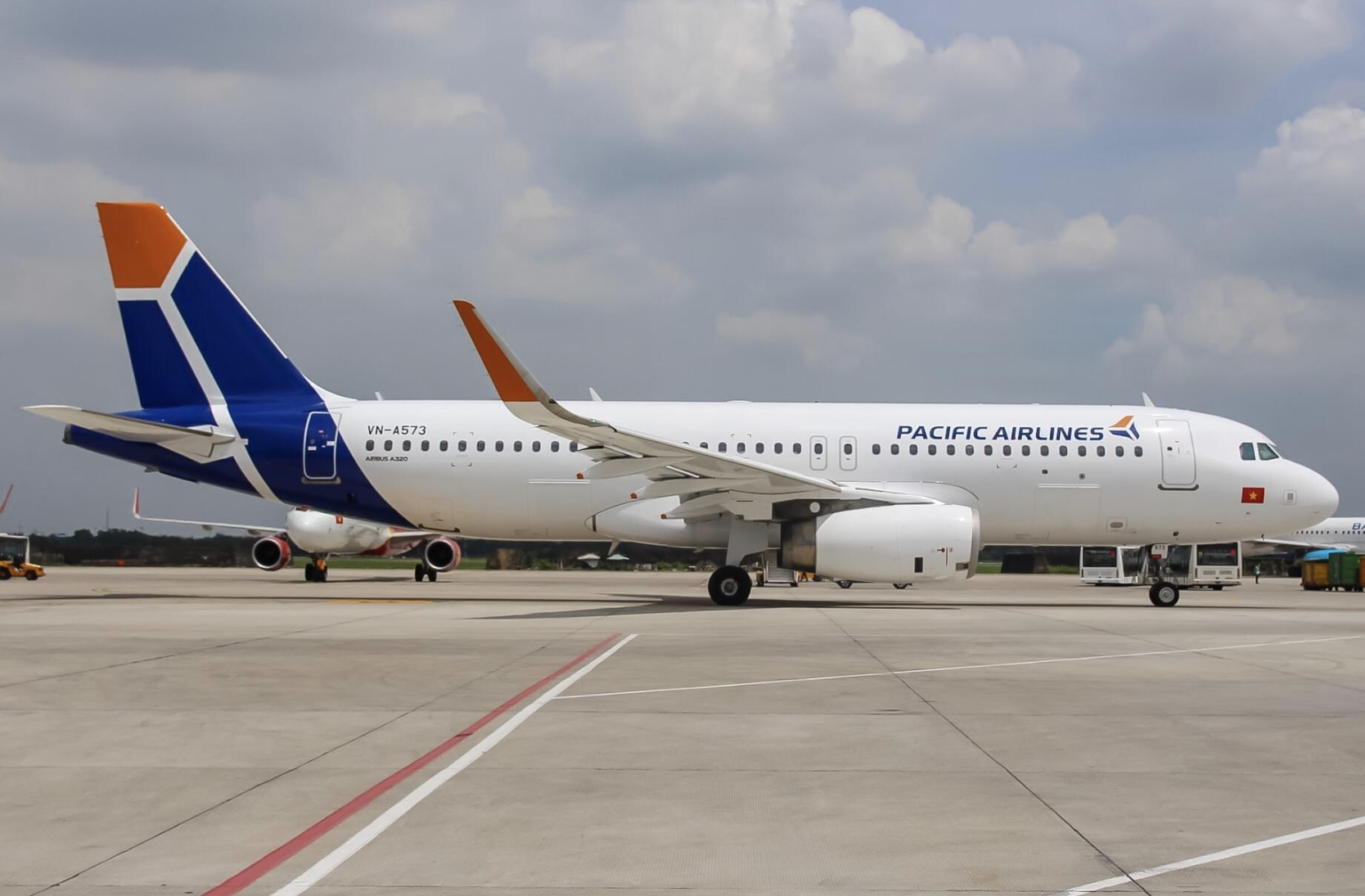
An Airbus A320-200 painted in Pacific Airlines colors.

In June 2020, Vietnam Airlines announced that it would take over all Qantas's shares and increase its ownership of Jetstar Pacific to 98%. The airline will no longer be operating under the Jetstar brand, but will revert to its original name Pacific Airlines. The ticketing system will also be migrated from the Qantas-based system used by Jetstar to the Sabre system used by Vietnam Airlines.

==== Financial issues and restructuring proposal ====
Approximately one year after the Qantas withdrawal, in June 2021, Vietnam Airlines declared that the impact of COVID-19 had resulted in the financial situation of Pacific Airlines being "extremely serious", posing the possibilities of insolvency and termination of operations. The Vietnamese state-owned flag carrier is looking for investors in order to restructure Pacific Airlines, however, it was revealed that the investor selection process faced many legal and other obstacles due to the fact that it (both Vietnam Airlines and Pacific Airlines) is a state-owned enterprise, admitting that the situation of Pacific Airlines "would be at risk" if no agreement is reached.

In March 2024, due to serious difficulties, Pacific Airlines declared pausing its operations, with its parent Vietnam Airlines handling all the affected customers.

The carrier restarted operations by June 2024 with three Airbus A321s from Vietnam Airlines, mostly to maintain its air operator's certificate. Following reports of huge cumulative losses by 2026, Vietnam Airlines reaffirmed its plan to divest from Pacific Airlines.

== Destinations ==
As of 2012, Pacific Airlines operated more than 40 daily flights to domestic destinations from its main operating base at Tan Son Nhat International Airport.

=== Codeshare agreements ===
Pacific Airlines has a codeshare agreement with the following airlines:

- Vietnam Airlines

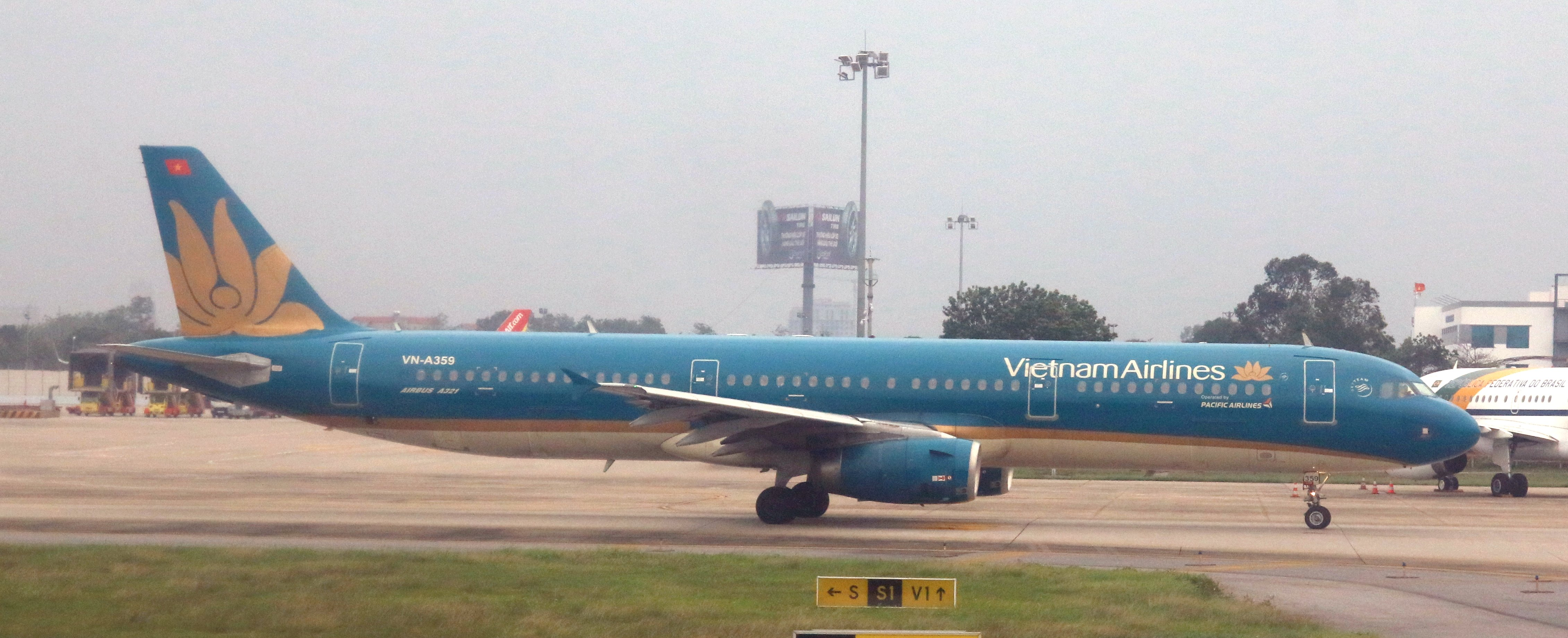
Vietnam Airlines Airbus A321 operating for Pacific Airlines, note the small sticker.

== Fleet ==
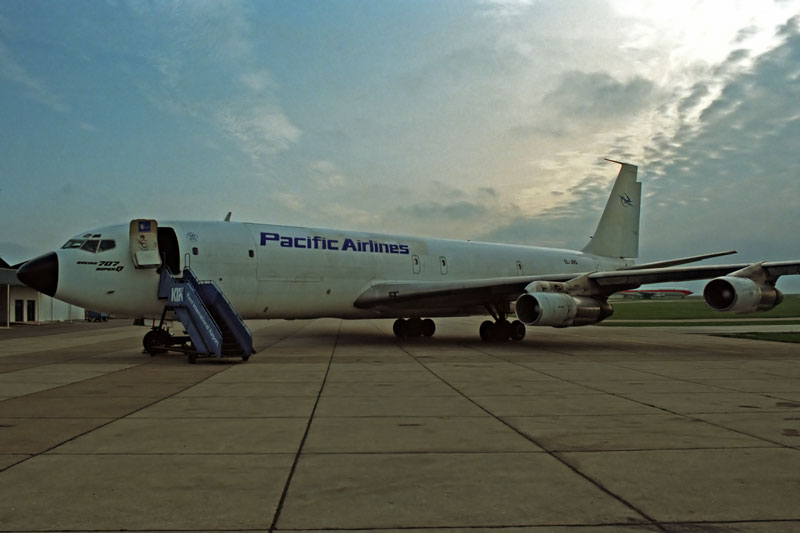
A rare Boeing 707 freighter with Pacific Airlines identity.

As of 26 June 2024, Pacific Airlines operates the following aircraft:

Pacific Airlines fleet
Aircraft	In fleet	Orders	Passengers			Notes
Aircraft	In fleet	Orders	J	Y	Total	Notes
Airbus A321-200	2	—	8	195	203	To be dry-leased from Vietnam Airlines to retain the carrier's AOC.
Airbus A321-200	1	—	16	168	184	To be dry-leased from Vietnam Airlines to retain the carrier's AOC.
Total	3	-				

=== Historic fleet ===
- Airbus A310-300
- Airbus A320-200
- Airbus A321-100
- Boeing 707-320C
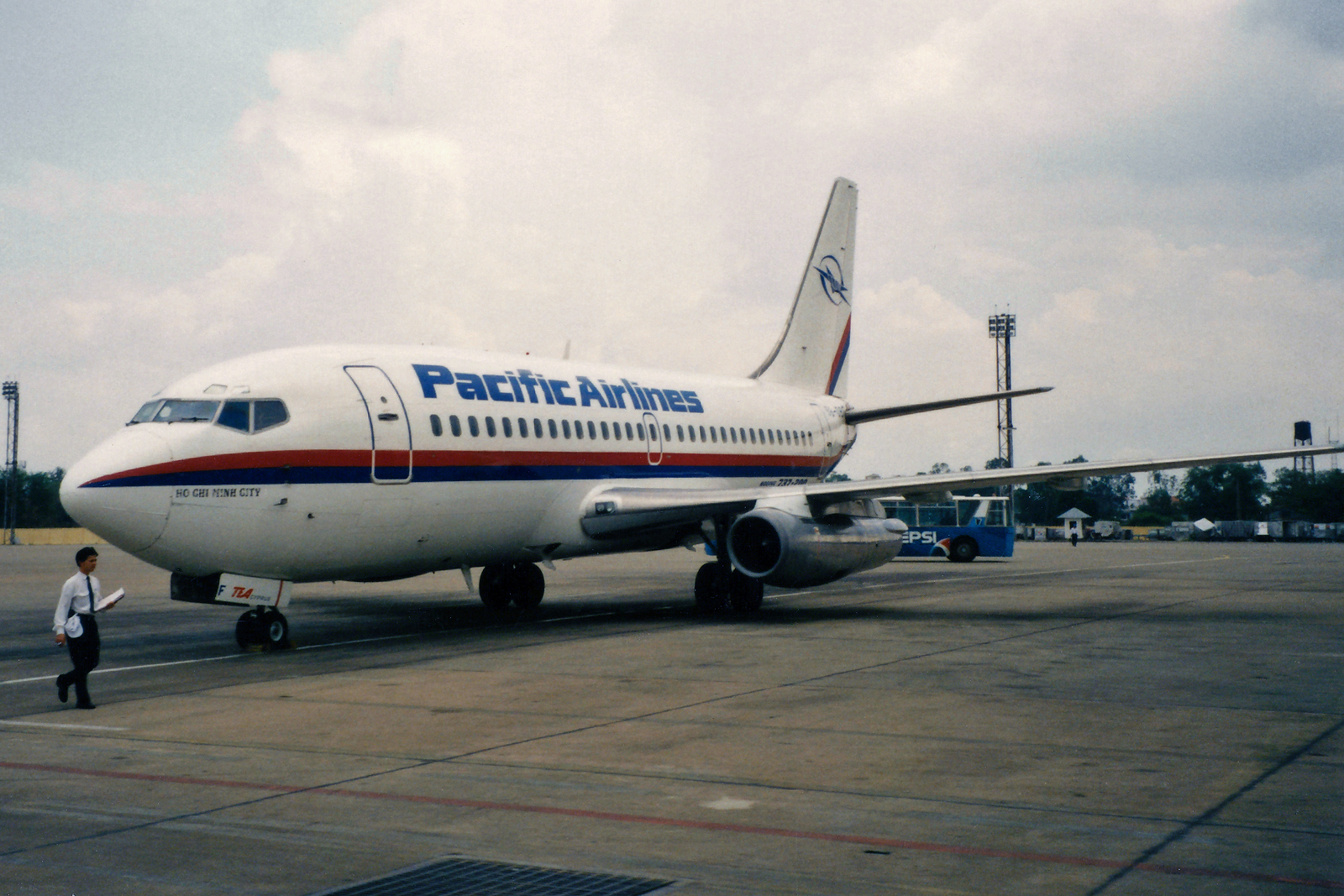
- Pacific Airlines 737-200 operating at Tan Son Nhat in 1997.
  Boeing 737-200
- Boeing 737-300
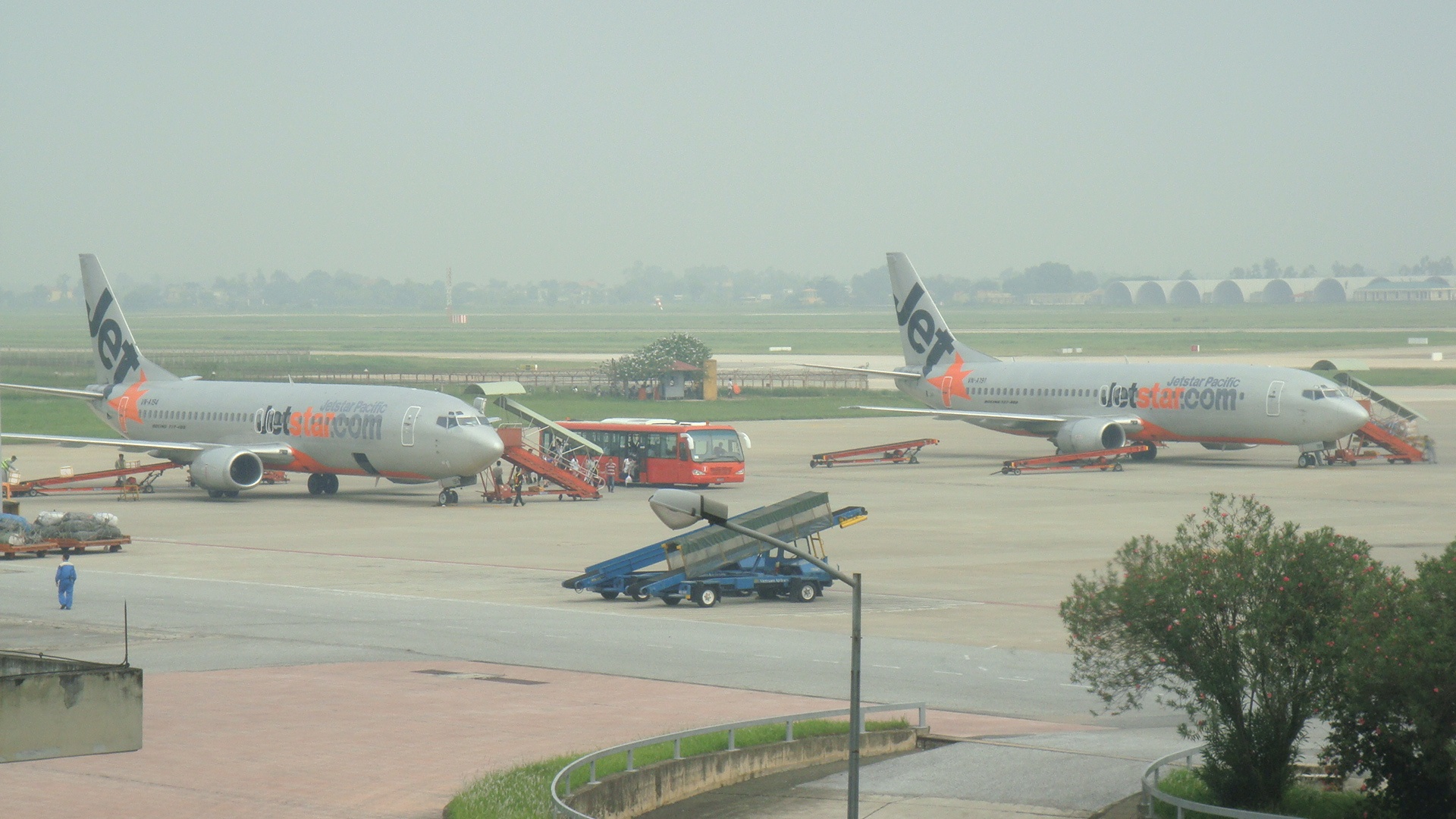
- A pair of Jetstar Pacific 737-400 at Noi Bai in 2010.
  Boeing 737-400
- McDonnell Douglas MD-82
- McDonnell Douglas MD-90

== See also ==
- Air transport in Vietnam
