= Vietstar Airlines =

Airline of Vietnam

IATA	ICAO	Call sign
VS	VSM	VIETSTAR
- Founded: 2010; 16 years ago
- Commenced operations: 2020; 6 years ago
- Operating bases: Hanoi; Ho Chi Minh City
- Fleet size: 4
- Parent company: Vietnam People's Air Force
- Headquarters: Ho Chi Minh City, Vietnam
- Key people: Phạm Trịnh Phương held the chairman, and CEO
- Website: www.vietstarairlines.vn/Eng/Default.aspx

Vietstar Airlines Multirole Corporation (VSA or VSM; Vietnamese: Công ty Hàng Không Lưỡng Dụng Ngôi Sao Việt, lit. 'Viet Star Dual-Purpose Aviation Company'), operating as Vietstar Airlines, is a Vietnamese charter airline registered in 28 Phan Thuc Duyen Street, Ward 4, Tan Binh District, Ho Chi Minh City, Vietnam with head office in Ho Chi Minh City. The airline was established with a charter capital of VND800 billion ($34.33 million) and partially owned by the A41 Factory, a Vietnam People's Air Force-associated company. The carrier started operations in early 2020.

Vietstar Airlines specializes in offering private jet charter for business, leisure and air ambulance under the Fly VIP Air trademark. Vietstar Airlines also provides engineering and ground handling services at many Vietnamese airports.

The airline was founded on April 27, 2010 and submitted its request to the Vietnamese Prime Minister for approval. The airline's AOC was granted on July 23, 2019.

Operations started in January 2020 with a leased Embraer Legacy 600 and Beechcraft King Air B300.

== Corporate affairs ==
=== Key people ===
As of July 2019, Phạm Trịnh Phương is the chairman and CEO.

=== Ownership ===
Vietstar Airlines is a joint venture of several aviation-related enterprises and is a wholly government-owned corporation, a unit of the Ministry of Defence of Vietnam.

== Fleet ==
Vietstar Airlines fleet
Aircraft	In service	Orders	Notes
King Air 350	1	—	
Embraer Legacy 600	1	—	
Embraer ERJ-135	1	—	
Embraer Legacy 650	1	—	
Total	4	—	

== See also ==
- Transport in Vietnam
