= Tan Son Nhat International Airport =

Commercial airport serving Ho Chi Minh City, Vietnam

Tan Son Nhat International Airport Sân bay quốc tế Tân Sơn Nhất Cảng hàng không quốc tế Tân Sơn Nhất
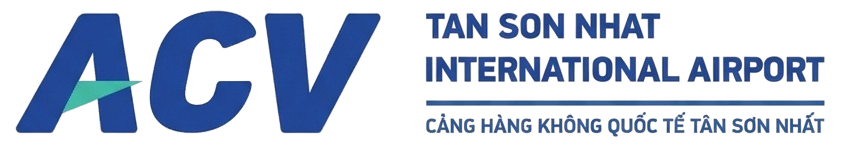

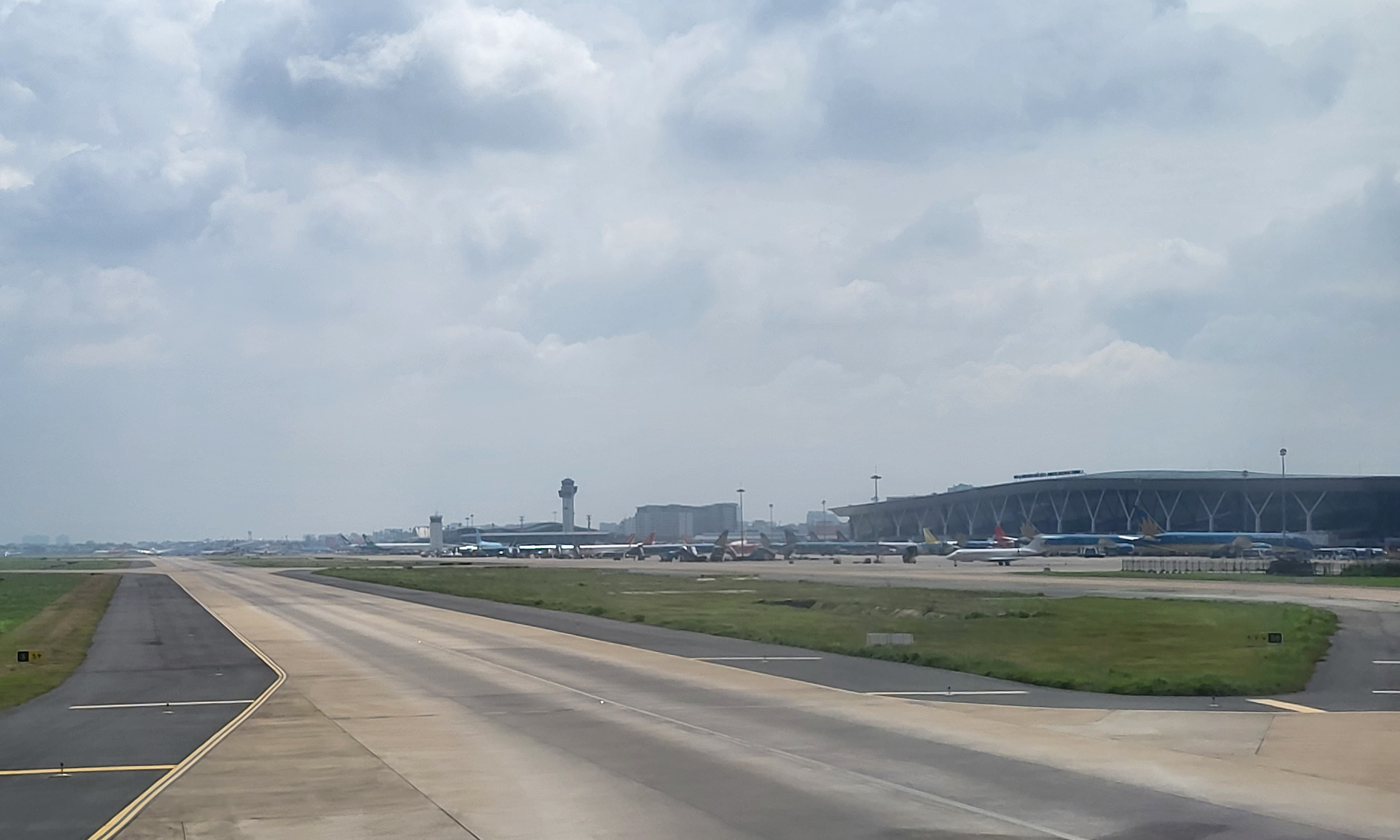
- IATA: SGN; ICAO: VVTS; WMO: 48900

Summary
- Airport type: Public / military
- Owner/Operator: Airports Corporation of Vietnam
- Serves: Ho Chi Minh City metropolitan area
- Location: Tân Sơn, Tân Sơn Nhất and Tân Sơn Hòa wards, Ho Chi Minh City
- Hub for: Vietnam Airlines; VASCO
- Focus city for: Sun PhuQuoc Airways
- Operating base for: Bamboo Airways; Pacific Airlines; VietJet Air; Vietravel Airlines; Vietstar Airlines
- Elevation AMSL: 10 m (33 ft)
- Coordinates: 10°49′08″N 106°39′07″E
- Website: acv.vn/vi/sgn

Map
- Location of airport in Ho Chi Minh City SGN/VVTS (Vietnam)

Runways
Direction	Length		Surface
Direction	m	ft	Surface
07L/25R	3,050	10,007	Concrete
07R/25L	3,828	12,559	Concrete

Statistics (2024)
- Passengers: 39,859,384 (▼1.9%)
- Source: Airports Corporation of Vietnam (ACV)

Tan Son Nhat International Airport (IATA: SGN, ICAO: VVTS) is an international airport serving Ho Chi Minh City, the most populous city in Vietnam. It is located in the former Tân Bình district within the Ho Chi Minh City metropolitan area.

It is the busiest airport in Vietnam, with 32.5 million passengers in 2016, 38.5 million passengers in 2018, and about 41 million passengers in 2023. As of December 2023, it is the 50th-busiest airport in the world, and the fourth-busiest in Southeast Asia. As of April 2025, it has a total capacity of approximately 50 million passengers following the opening of Terminal 3. Previous capacity limits of approximately 30 million passengers had caused constant and increasing traffic and congestion, leading to the construction of another airport in Ho Chi Minh City as an alternative, scheduled to be completed by the first half of 2026.

Of the routes the airport serves, the domestic Ho Chi Minh City–Hanoi route is the busiest in Southeast Asia and the fourth-busiest in the world, serving around 11 million passengers in 2023. Its IATA airport code, SGN, is derived from the city's former name of Saigon.

== History ==
=== Early history and Vietnam War era ===
Tan Son Nhat International Airport has its origins in the early 1920s when the French colonial government constructed a small airport with unpaved runways, known as Tân Sơn Nhứt Airfield near the village of Tan Son Nhut, and was later expanded in 1930s.

Saigon was the eastern terminus of Air Orient and its successor Air France's Asia service in the late 1920s and 1930s, a week-long voyage from London that operated once a week using SPCA Météore 63 flying boats and, from the mid-1930s, Dewoitine D.338 trimotor land planes.

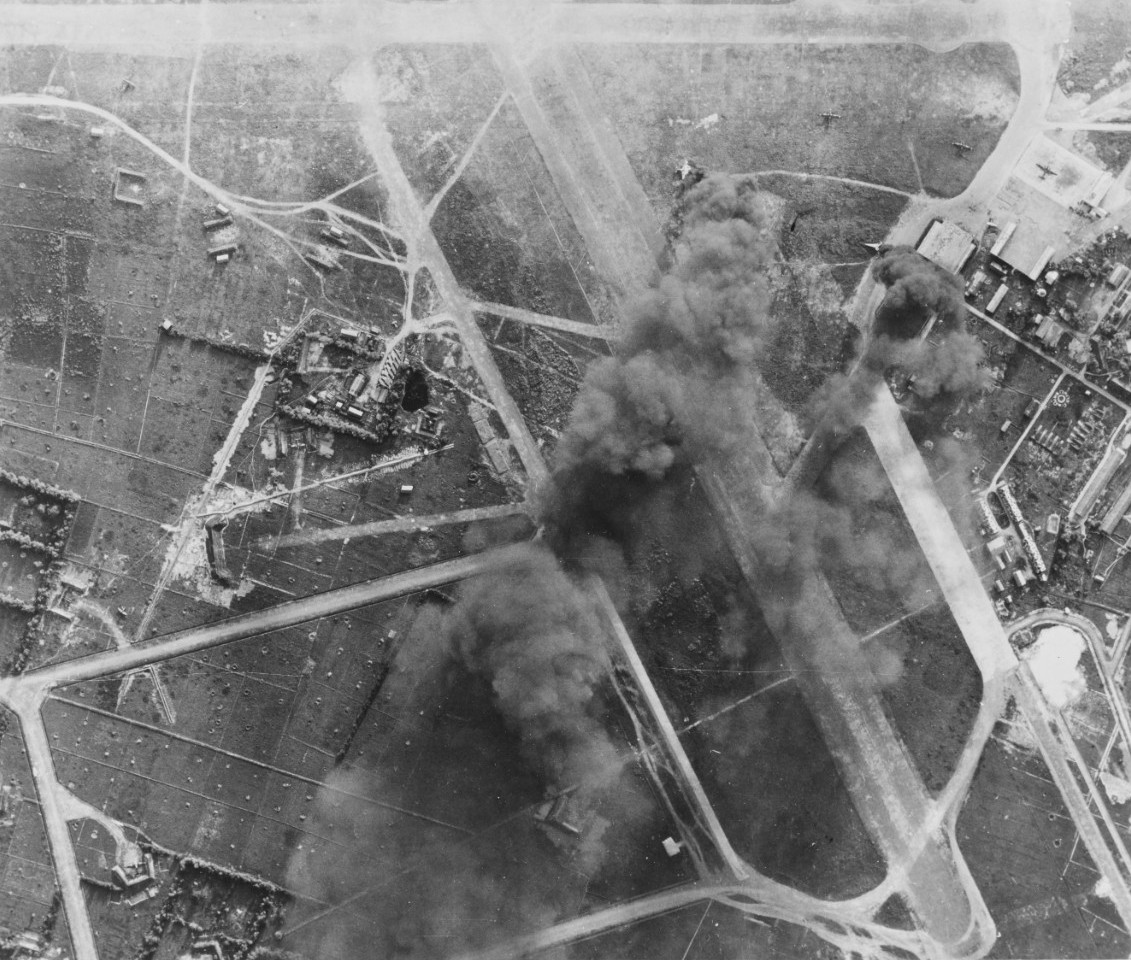
The airfield under attack by aircraft from the USS Wasp during World War II, 1945

From 1941 to 1945, while Indochina was under Japanese control, French air service was severed and Imperial Japanese Airways connected Saigon to Bangkok and Hanoi, using Mitsubishi MC-20 aircraft.

After the war, Air France resumed the weekly Paris-Saigon route, which took four days with five stops en route; by 1950 the route was served by DC-4s and Constellations, and was a connecting point for onward Air France service to Australia and New Caledonia. Pan American World Airways began DC-4 service to Saigon in May 1953, connecting the airport to Manila and Singapore.

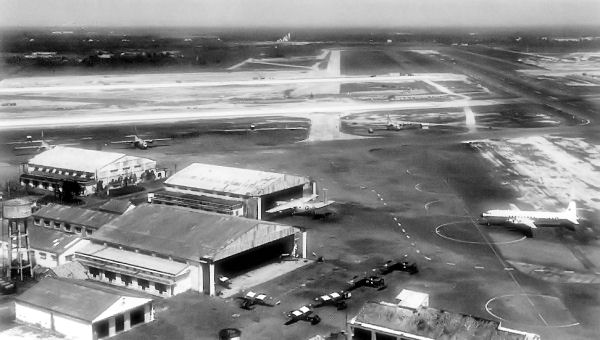
Aerial view of Tan Son Nhut Air Base in 1962

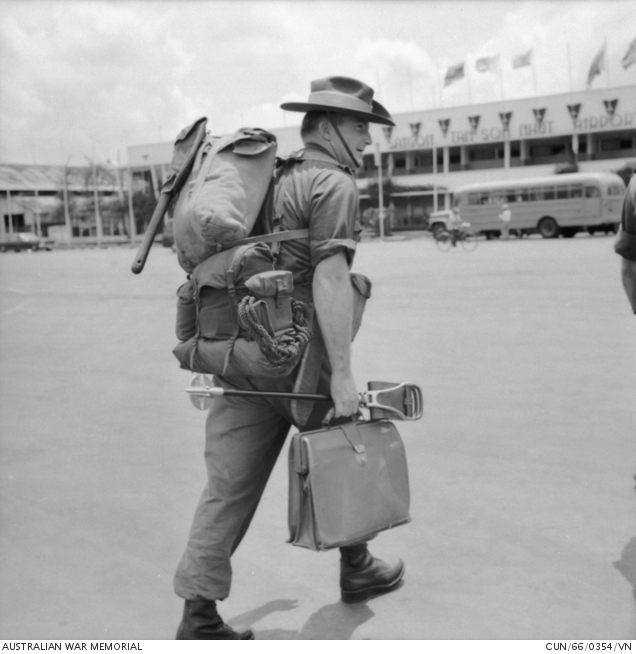
An Australian soldier arriving at the airport in 1966

By mid-1956, with U.S. aid, a 7,200-foot (2,190 m) runway had been built; the airfield near Saigon became known as South Vietnam's principal international gateway. During the Vietnam War (or Second Indochina War), Tan Son Nhut Air Base (then using the Southern spelling "Tân Sơn Nhứt") was an important facility for both the U.S. Air Force and the Republic of Vietnam Air Force. Between 1968 and 1974, Tan Son Nhut Airport was one of the busiest military airbases in the world. Pan Am schedules from 1973 show that during the last days of South Vietnam, Boeing 747 service was being operated four times a week to San Francisco via Guam and Manila. Continental Airlines operated up to 30 Boeing 707 military charters per week to and from Tan Son Nhut Airport during the 1968–74 period.

In the final days of the Vietnam War, the FAA banned US passenger flights to and from Vietnam. Pan Am was given permission to operate a final 747 charter from Tan Son Nhut on April 24, 1975, six days before the fall of Saigon to North Vietnamese forces. The 375-seat aircraft, Clipper Unity, carried 463 passengers evacuating Vietnam, including refugees and airline employees, some of whom sat on the floor or in the toilets.

=== Post-war era ===
Service at the airport was very limited in the wake of the Vietnam War. As of 1989, the only international carriers at the airport were Aeroflot with a weekly multi-stop Il-86 service from Moscow, Air France with a twice-weekly multi-stop 747 service from Paris, Philippine Airlines with a weekly BAC One-Eleven service from Manila, and Thai Airways International with a twice-weekly 737 service from Bangkok. The Vietnamese national carrier Hang Khong Vietnam served Bangkok, Da Nang, Hanoi, and Manila with Tu-134s.

By the mid-1990s, the airport had nonstop flights to major Asia-Pacific gateways such as Dubai, Hong Kong, Melbourne, Osaka, Seoul, Sydney and Taipei, as well as one-stop service to Amsterdam, Frankfurt, Moscow, Paris and Vienna.

In December 2004, United Airlines became the first U.S. airline to fly to Vietnam since the Vietnam War. United suspended Ho Chi Minh City service in 2017 but resumed it in October 2025, operating from Los Angeles with a stop in Hong Kong.

In 2006, Tan Son Nhat International Airport served approximately 8.5 million passengers (compared with 7 million in 2005) with 64,000 aircraft movements. It has recently accounted for nearly two-thirds of the arrivals and departures at Vietnam's international gateway airports. Due to increasing demand (about 15–20% per annum), the airport has been continuously expanded by the Southern Airports Corporation.

In 2010, Tan Son Nhat domestic terminal handled 8 million passengers, its maximum capacity. The airport reached its full capacity of 20 million passengers in 2013, two years earlier than predicted. Both domestic and international terminal are being expanded to meet the increasing demand. In December 2014, expansion for the domestic terminal was finished, boosting the terminal's capacity to 13 million passengers per annum. In September 2017, People's Army of Vietnam ceded 21 hectare of military land in the vicinity of the airport to Airports Corporation of Vietnam for civil use. This gave way for the construction of 21 new aircraft parking spaces, expected to be completed by Tet holidays in 2018. Tan Son Nhat will then have 72 parking spaces for airplanes.

Of the routes the airport serves, the Ho Chi Minh City–Hanoi route is the busiest in Southeast Asia and the seventh busiest in the world, serving 6,769,823 customers in 2017.

In October 2022, the aircraft revetments built by the U.S. were removed to make way for a taxiway. Seven larger ones are set to be constructed as replacement 800 meters away.

== Terminals and other facilities ==
=== Passenger terminals ===
==== Terminal 1 (T1 Domestic) ====
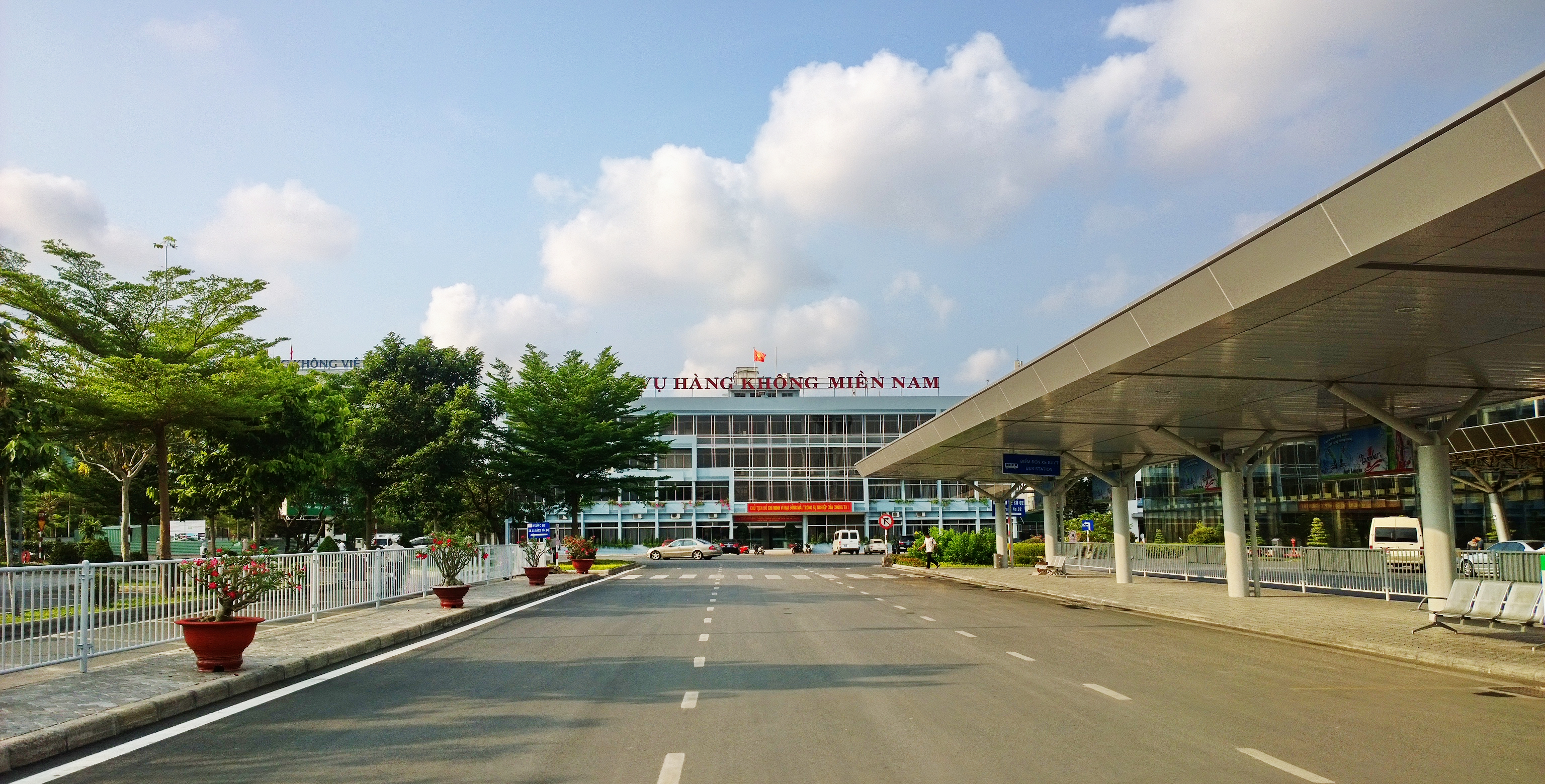
The T1 for domestic routes, as seen in 2014.

Until the opening of the International Terminal in 2007, the domestic terminal was the sole civilian terminal of the airport. The French Indochinese administration built the original terminal. It initially covered an area of 1,800 m^{2} (19,000 sq ft). Between 1954 and 1975 when the airport quickly became one of the busiest airports in the world, it was expanded 4 more times: in 1956, 1960, 1963 (which was handled by the contractor RMK-BRJ), and 1969. By 1972, the terminal grew to 10,800 m^{2} (116,000 sq ft) in space with a capacity of 1.5 million passengers a year.

In recent history, after years of constant expansion to meet growing traffic, the terminal's handling capacity increased tenfold to 15 million passengers a year as of 2023. It has a floor area of 40,948 m^{2} (440,760 sq ft) with 20 boarding gates (4 aerobridge gates and 16 remote gates).

After the opening of Terminal 3, the terminal is solely serving domestic flights for Vietjet Air. Following other carriers' terminal switch, Vietjet moved its landside operations into Departure Hall A, while its former base in Departure Hall B will be converted to a transit hub connecting all passenger terminals.

==== Terminal 2 (T2 International) ====
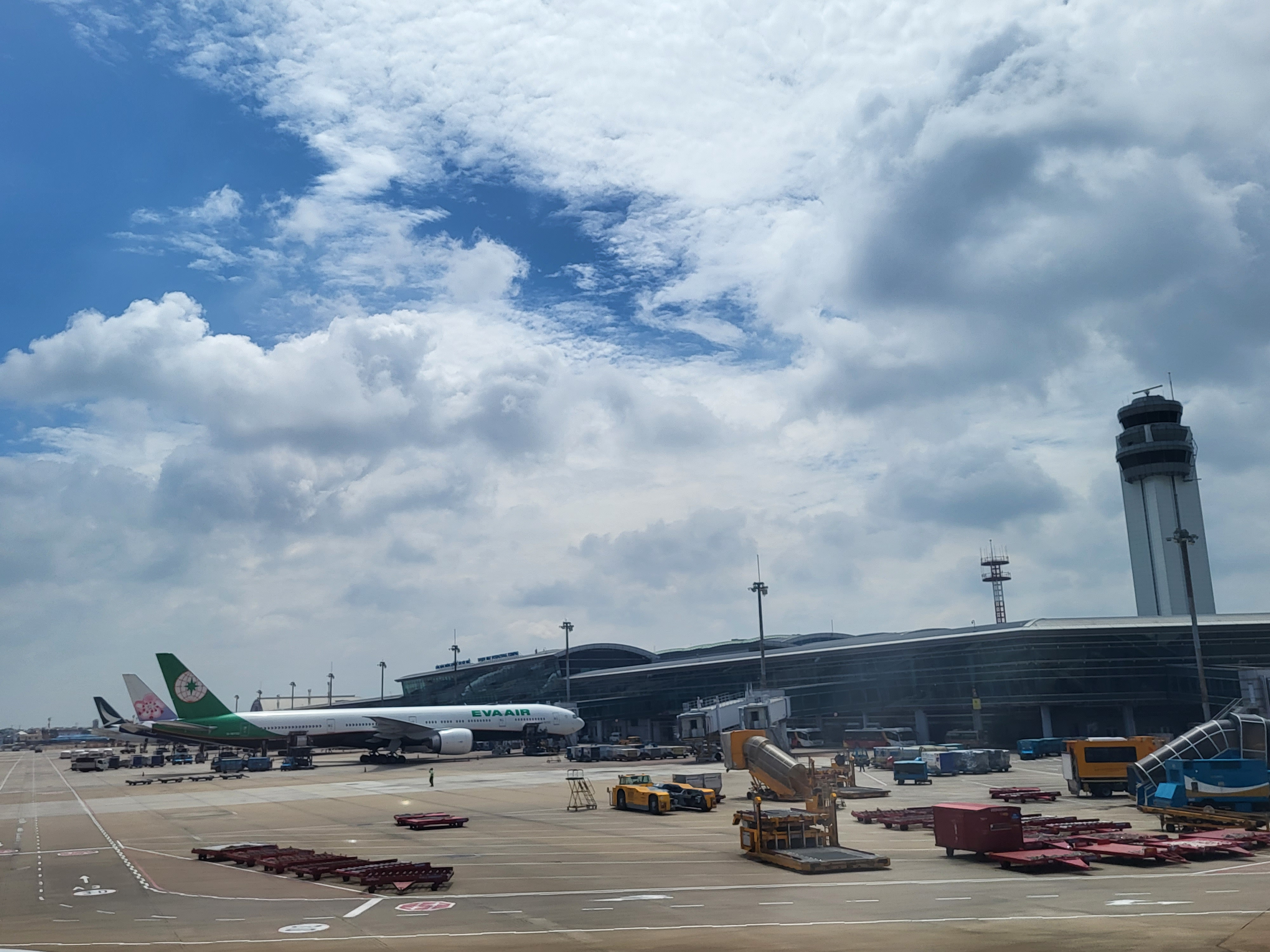
The for-international T2 in 2026.

A new international terminal, constructed by a consortium of four Japanese contractors (KTOM, abbreviation of four contractors' names: Kajima – Taisei – Obayashi – Maeda), opened in December 2007 with an initial designed capacity of 10 million passengers a year. The terminal was funded by Japanese official development assistance at a cost of 219 million USD.

In 2014, the terminal served over 9 million international passengers and a demand of an expansion to the terminal was in sight. Plan for a 109 million-USD expansion of the international terminal was approved in August 2014. The first phase of an urgent expansion to the terminal was finished in December 2016 with the addition of 2 new jet bridges and other facilities. Upon the completion of phase two in 2018, the terminal has a floor area of 115,834 m^{2} (1,246,830 sq ft) and 26 boarding gates, and can handle 13 million passengers annually.

There are a total of seven passenger lounges situated in the International Terminal: Apricot Business Lounge, Jasmine Halal, Lotus Lounge 1 and 2, Le Saigonnais, Orchid Lounge, and Rose Business Lounge.

==== Terminal 3 (T3 Domestic) ====
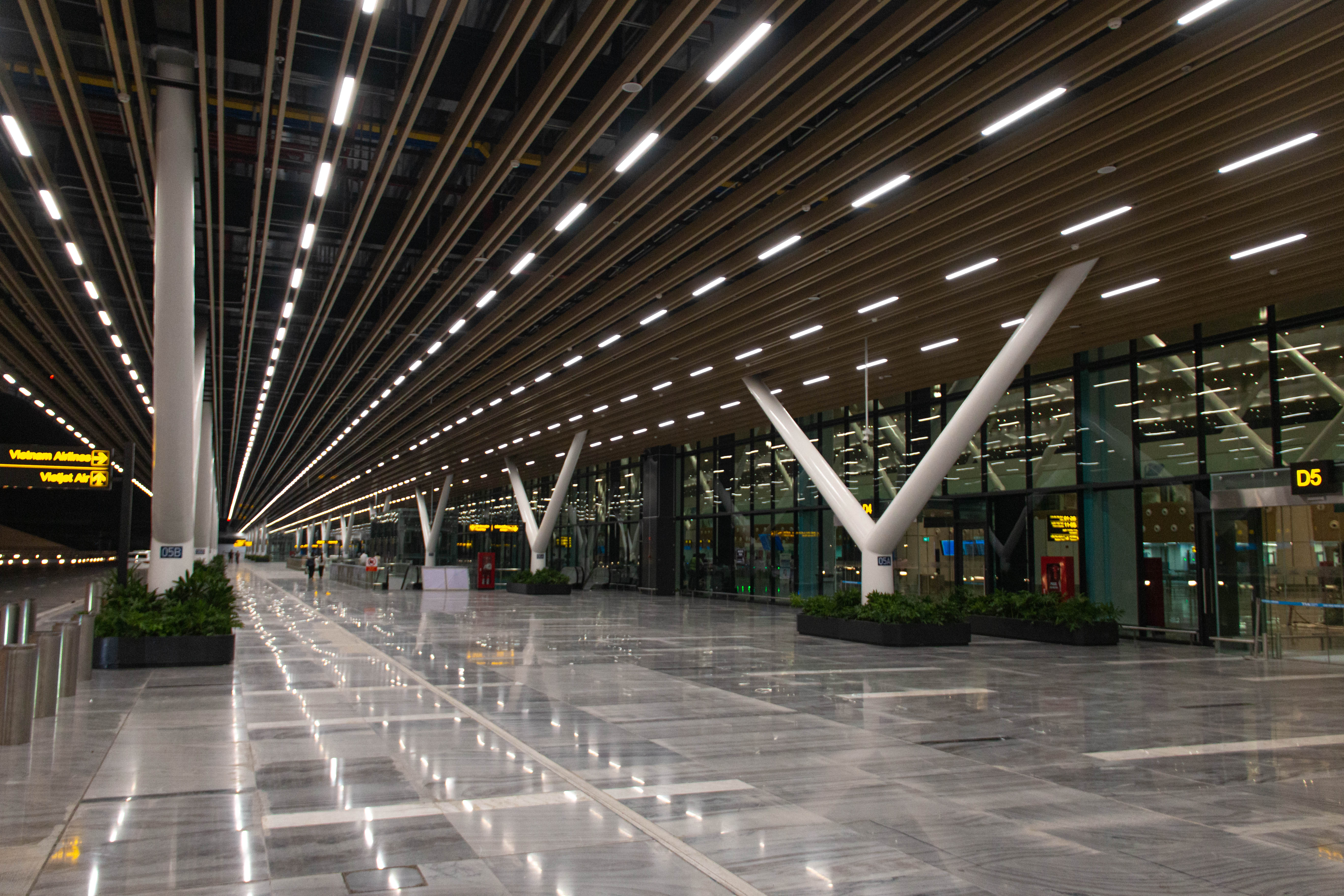
Departure area at Terminal 3

A new passenger terminal for the airport broke ground on 24 December 2022. The new terminal includes 27 gates (13 jetbridges and 14 remote gates) for an annual handling capacity of 20 million passengers. The terminal building has a total floor area of 112,500 m^{2} (1,211,000 sq ft), and is connected with new 130,000 m^{2} (1,400,000 sq ft) non-aviation services and parking complex by footbridges. The project has a budget of 10,986 billion VND (US$467.6 million) and was projected to be completed by the end of 2024, but opened in April 2025. The terminal will serve domestic flights to support the current domestic terminal. On 16 April 2025, the first commercial flight from Terminal 3 was operated by Vietnam Airlines, and began trial operations on 17 April and formal operations on 30 April. Pacific Airlines, VASCO, Bamboo Airways, Sun PhuQuoc Airways and Vietravel Airlines operate their domestic flights from Terminal 3.

=== Cargo terminal ===
Tan Son Nhat Airport currently has three cargo terminals. Two of them (Air Freight Terminal 1 and 2) are operated by Tan Son Nhat Cargo Services (TCS) and the other one is operated by Saigon Cargo Services Corporation (SCSC). These facilities have a handling capacity of 700,000 tonnes of cargo per year combined.

TCS's Air Freight Terminal 1 was the first cargo terminal at the airport. It was inaugurated on 1 January 1997. In May 2012, Air Freight Terminal 2 was opened after 20 months of construction. The latter was built at a cost of $15 million and covers an area of 13,700 m^{2} (147,000 sq ft).

The Prime Minister of Vietnam, by Decision 1646/TTg-NN, has approved the addition of 40 hectares (99 acres) of the adjacent area to extend the apron and to build a cargo terminal to handle the rapid increase of passenger (expected to reach 17 million in 2010, compared to 7 million and 8.5 million in 2005 and 2006 respectively) and cargo volume at the airport.

The SCSC cargo terminal was constructed from March 2009 to December 2010 at a cost of $50 million. The cargo handling area consists of a 26,670 m^{2} (287,100 sq ft) cargo terminal, 52,421 m^{2} (564,250 sq ft) of apron area, and 64,000 m^{2} (690,000 sq ft) of warehouse and other facilities.

=== Runways and air control ===
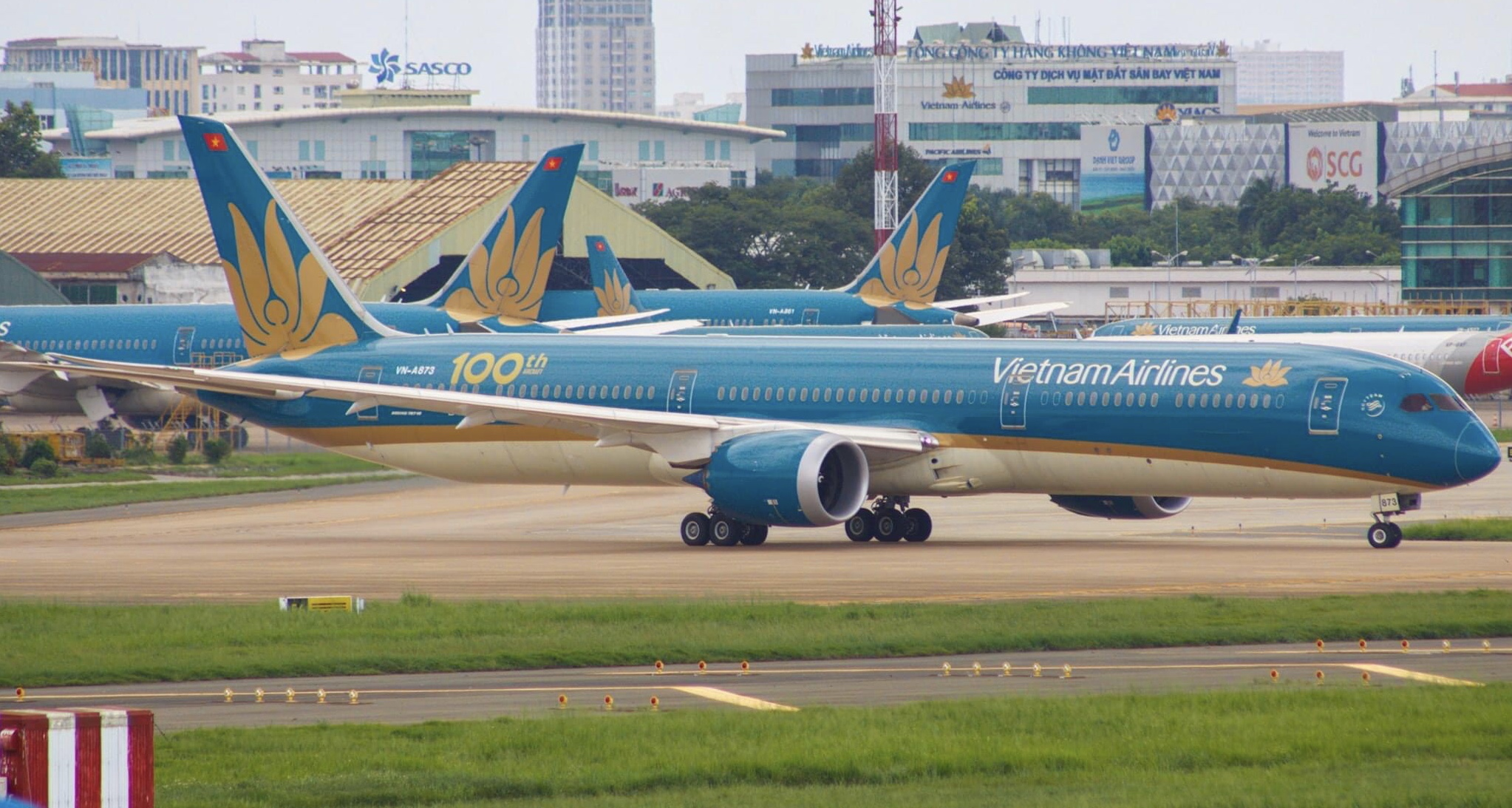
A Vietnam Airlines Boeing 787-10 taxiing towards a runway

The airport has two parallel runways, namely 07L/25R, and 07R/25L. Since the runways are only 365 meters apart, they are operated dependently. Due to the maximum processing capacity of the passenger terminals (about 3,600 passengers/hour), the runway system's capacity is capped at 44 operations per hour. During peak seasons such as Tết, the hourly limit is extended to 48 operations.

The original air traffic control tower is situated between present-day taxiway Y1 and S5. It was originally built in 1949 before being rebuilt in 1959. During the Tet Offensive in 1968, the tower was damaged by a rocket and a new tower was built in June 1969.

A new 70-meter (230-feet) tall air control tower was put into use in 2013.

== Airlines and destinations ==
=== Passenger ===
Airlines	Destinations
Aeroflot	Moscow–Sheremetyevo
Air Cambodia	Phnom Penh, Siem Reap, Sihanoukville
Air China	Beijing–Capital, Chongqing
Air France	Paris–Charles de Gaulle
Air India	Delhi
AirAsia	Johor Bahru, Kuala Lumpur–International, Kota Kinabalu
AirAsia Cambodia	Phnom Penh
Air Premia	Seoul–Incheon (resumes 4 December 2026)
All Nippon Airways	Tokyo–Haneda
Asiana Airlines	Seoul–Incheon (ends 17 December 2026)
Bamboo Airways	Da Lat, Da Nang, Hai Phong, Hanoi, Quy Nhon, Thanh Hoa, Vinh
Bhutan Airlines	Seasonal: Paro
Cathay Pacific	Hong Kong
Cebu Pacific	Cebu, Manila
China Airlines	Taipei–Taoyuan
China Eastern Airlines	Hangzhou, Kunming, Nanjing, Ningbo, Shanghai–Pudong
China Southern Airlines	Changsha, Guangzhou, Shanghai–Pudong, Shenzhen, Wuhan
Chongqing Airlines	Chongqing
Emirates	Dubai–International
EVA Air	Taipei–Taoyuan
Hainan Airlines	Haikou
IndiGo	Kolkata
Japan Airlines	Tokyo–Haneda, Tokyo–Narita
Jetstar	Melbourne, Sydney–Kingsford Smith
Jin Air	Seoul–Incheon (begins 25 December 2026)
Juneyao Air	Shanghai–Pudong
Korean Air	Seoul–Incheon
Kunming Airlines	Kunming
Lao Airlines	Pakse, Vientiane
Loong Air	Wenzhou
Malaysia Airlines	Kuala Lumpur–International
Mandarin Airlines	Taichung
MIAT Mongolian Airlines	Seasonal: Ulaanbaatar
Myanmar Airways International	Yangon
Philippine Airlines	Manila
Qatar Airways	Phnom Penh
Qingdao Airlines	Qingdao
Royal Brunei Airlines	Bandar Seri Begawan
Ruili Airlines	Lijiang
Scoot	Singapore
Shandong Airlines	Jinan, Qingdao
Shenzhen Airlines	Shenzhen
Sichuan Airlines	Chengdu–Tianfu
Singapore Airlines	Singapore
Spring Airlines	Guangzhou, Shanghai–Pudong
Starlux Airlines	Taipei–Taoyuan
Sun PhuQuoc Airways	Chengdu–Tianfu, Da Nang, Hai Phong, Hanoi, Phu Quoc, Quang Ninh, Seoul–Incheon, Shanghai–Pudong
Thai AirAsia	Bangkok–Don Mueang
Thai Airways International	Bangkok–Suvarnabhumi
Thai Lion Air	Bangkok–Don Mueang
Thai VietJet Air	Bangkok–Suvarnabhumi
Turkish Airlines	Istanbul
Turkmenistan Airlines	Ashgabat
United Airlines	Hong Kong, Los Angeles
VietJet Air	Ahmedabad, Bangkok–Suvarnabhumi, Beijing–Daxing, Bengaluru, Brisbane, Buon Ma Thuot, Busan, Cebu, Chengdu–Tianfu, Chiang Mai, Chu Lai, Clark, Colombo–Bandaranaike, Con Dao, Da Lat, Da Nang, Delhi, Denpasar, Dong Hoi, Fukuoka, Guangzhou, Hai Phong, Hanoi, Hong Kong, Hue, Hyderabad, Jakarta–Soekarno-Hatta, Kaohsiung, Kochi, Kuala Lumpur–International, Malé (begins 5 December 2026), Manila, Melbourne, Mumbai–Shivaji, Nagoya–Centrair, Nha Trang, Osaka–Kansai, Perth, Phu Quoc, Phuket, Pleiku, Qui Nhon, Seoul–Incheon, Shanghai–Pudong, Singapore, Sydney–Kingsford Smith, Sydney–Western (begins 9 January 2027), Taichung, Taipei–Taoyuan, Thanh Hoa, Tokyo–Haneda, Tokyo–Narita, Tuy Hoa, Vientiane, Vinh, Xi'an, Zhangjiajie
Vietnam Airlines	Bangkok–Suvarnabhumi, Beijing–Daxing, Buon Ma Thuot, Busan, Ca Mau, Chu Lai, Colombo–Bandaranaike, Copenhagen, Da Lat, Da Nang, Delhi, Denpasar, Dong Hoi, Frankfurt, Fukuoka, Guangzhou, Haikou, Hai Phong, Hanoi, Hong Kong, Hue, Jakarta–Soekarno-Hatta, Kaohsiung, Kuala Lumpur–International, Kunming, London–Heathrow, Manila, Melbourne, Mumbai–Shivaji, Munich, Nagoya–Centrair, Nha Trang, Osaka–Kansai, Paris–Charles de Gaulle, Perth, Phnom Penh, Phu Quoc, Phuket, Pleiku, Qui Nhon, Rach Gia, San Francisco, Seoul–Incheon, Shanghai–Pudong, Shenzhen, Siem Reap, Singapore, Sydney–Kingsford Smith, Taipei–Taoyuan, Thanh Hoa, Tokyo–Narita, Tuy Hoa, Vientiane, Vinh
Vietravel Airlines	Bangkok–Suvarnabhumi, Hai Phong, Hanoi, Thanh Hoa Vinh
XiamenAir	Fuzhou, Xiamen; Seasonal: Hangzhou

=== Cargo ===
Airlines	Destinations
Air Premia	Seoul–Incheon
AeroLogic	Los Angeles
Cathay Cargo	Hanoi, Hong Kong
EVA Air Cargo	Taipei–Taoyuan
My Indo Airlines	Jakarta–Soekarno-Hatta
SF Airlines	Shenzhen
Tri-MG Intra Asia Airlines	Singapore
UPS Airlines	Shenzhen

== Statistics ==
=== Cargo volume (tons) ===
==== 2020–present ====
Source: Civil Aviation Authority of Vietnam, Port Authority of New York and New Jersey

== Ground transportation ==
=== Inter-terminal transport ===
Tan Son Nhat International Airport provides both landside and airside shuttle services to facilitate passenger transfers between its terminals. While Terminals 1 and 2 are adjacent to each other, Terminal 3 is located at a greater distance.

On the landside, a free shuttle bus operates between all three terminals at 15-minute intervals from 04:30 to 00:30. The designated pick-up and drop-off points are:

- Terminal 1: Pillars B17–B20, Lane B
- Terminal 2: Pillars B15–B16, Lane B
- Terminal 3: Pillars A17–A20, Level 1

On the airside, a dedicated shuttle bus operates for transit passengers from Terminal 3 to Gate A2 in Terminal 1. This service runs every 20 minutes from 07:00 to 03:00. From Gate A2, passengers can proceed to domestic departure gates within Terminal 1 or walk directly to Terminal 2 for international departures, as the two terminals are connected airside. There is no return airside service from Terminal 1 or 2 to Terminal 3; passengers arriving at these terminals must exit to the landside area to reach Terminal 3.

=== Public transport ===
==== Bus and shuttle ====
A bus station is situated in front of the international terminal and is served by Ho Chi Minh City Bus. It is connected to the city center by bus line 109 and 152 as well as shuttle bus line 49. Connecting the airport to Vung Tau and other cities in Mekong Delta are express minibus services as well as bus line 119 (via Mien Tay Bus Station).

==== Train ====
The airport is expected to be served by the Ho Chi Minh City Metro in the future:

- Line 4: A north–south line that will connect Tan Son Nhat International Airport with the city center and other districts.
- Line 6: An inner ring line that will link the airport to Thu Thiem railway station, providing onward access to Long Thanh International Airport via the planned North–South express railway.

=== Road ===
Until 2016, the airport only had one main access route via Trường Sơn Street, which caused chronic congestion for traffic going in and out of the airport. As an effort to ease traffic bottleneck, in August 2016, Phạm Văn Đồng Boulevard officially opened and connected the airport to National Route 1 in an intersection east of the airport.

The new terminal 3 building is accessible via a new road connecting the existing Trần Quốc Hoàn Street and Cộng Hòa Street. This new connector road is expected to alleviate the traffic pressure surrounding the airport area and provide an alternative exit from the airport to the west side of the city.

== Accidents and incidents ==
Throughout its history there have been several incidents that happened at the airport, some of the most notable are summarized below:

- On 4 April 1975, a Lockheed C-5A Galaxy, operated by the United States Air Force as part of Operation Babylift en route to Clark Air Base in the Philippines, crashed on approach during an emergency landing. Out of 328 people on board (311 passengers and 17 crew members), 155 were killed.
- On 12 January 1991, a Vietnam Airlines-operated Tupolev Tu-134, registration VN-A126, with 76 passengers on board crashed on final approach to Ho Chi Minh City. At 30 ft (9.1 m), the Tupolev suddenly lost height and landed hard, touched down with the left main gear first. There were no casualties but the aircraft was written off due to substantial damage.
- On 4 September 1992, Vietnam Airlines Flight 850, an Airbus A310-300 en route from Bangkok to Ho Chi Minh City, was hijacked by Ly Tong, a former pilot in the Republic of Vietnam Air Force. Tong proceeded to drop anti-communist leaflets over Ho Chi Minh City before parachuting out of an emergency exit. Vietnamese security forces arrested him on the ground two hours later. The aircraft landed safely, and no one on board was injured.
- On 20 November 2014, the three-unit uninterruptible power supply of Ho Chi Minh City Area Air Control Center went offline, causing a blackout to the center that oversees air traffic from and to Tan Son Nhat from 11:05 AM to 12:19 PM. This incident also disabled the radar system, halting air traffic control capabilities. Overall, 92 flights were affected; 54 of them were within Ho Chi Minh flight information region and eight were preparing to land at Tan Son Nhat at the time of the incident. No air traffic accident occurred and operations fully resumed by noon the next day.
- On 22 April 2017, Tan Son Nhat International Airport was the site of an alleged terrorist attack. Two remotely controlled petrol bombs were planted at the airport, one in the International Terminal while the other was placed in the airport's parking garage. The bomb in the terminal failed to detonate due to internal sabotage. The bomb in the garage initially also failed to detonate because the activator was out of range. It was subsequently moved and set off in the International Terminal's departure hall where the first bomb was originally placed. No one was injured nor killed in the attack. A total of 15 people were arrested for involvement in the attack, according to the Vietnamese state media.

== Future plans ==
=== New airport ===
Tan Son Nhat International Airport is located inside the crowded urban core of Ho Chi Minh City, making expansions difficult. In a report submitted to the Vietnamese National Assembly in 2015, legislators deemed continued expansion of Tan Son Nhat problematic in five aspects. Firstly, it would be more economically viable to build a new airport rather than extensively upgrade Tan Son Nhat. An estimated US$9.1 billion was reportedly needed for a new 4,000 m runway, a new passenger terminal and other facilities at Tan Son Nhat. Secondly, Tan Son Nhat airspace overlaps with that of Bien Hoa Airport, which is currently reserved for military purposes. A reduction in military activities in Bien Hoa is considered to be temporary and unsustainable. At the same time, Tan Son Nhat also acts as a strategic location in national defense; therefore, the airport cannot be used entirely for civic air transport. Additionally, due to its urban location, aside from increasing ground traffic stress in its access points, the airport cannot operate between midnight and 5AM in accordance to the International Civil Aviation Organization sustainable development goals, further limiting its capability.

However, Ho Chi Minh City People's Assembly believed that building a new airport can be impractical and unrealistic, giving that the numbers supporting the new airport are "wrong calculations, magical stats" to "trick others with a purpose of serving their own designs." The cost of construction is too high in the midst of already-suppressed national debt, stressing the people without fully-diagnosed value. It is believed that the delay of the expansion is due to the military-run golf course at the north of the airport, where the land is listed as "defense land." Ho Chi Minh City hired an independent French consultant firm ADPi to evaluate the suggestions. The firm supported the idea of expansion at first, but then called off and delayed its final statement, and finally released a report to support the new airport proposition. The city's Assembly responded that the report was rigged.

Following Decision 703/QĐ-TTg by the Vietnamese Prime Minister in July 2005, a new airport—Long Thanh International Airport—was planned to replace Tan Son Nhat airport for international departure use. The initial master plan for the new airport was publicly announced in December 2006. The new airport will be built in Long Thành District, Đồng Nai Province, about 40 km (25 mi) east of Ho Chi Minh City and 65 km (40 mi) north of the petroleum-focused city of Vung Tau, near Highway 51A.

According to the approved modified plan in 2011, Long Thanh International Airport will be constructed on an area of 50 square kilometers (19 sq mi), and will have four runways (4,000 m x 60 m or 13,100 ft x 200 ft) and be capable of receiving the Airbus A380. The project will be divided in three stages. Stage One calls for the construction of two parallel runways and a terminal with a capacity of 25 million passengers per year, due to be completed in 2020. Stage Two is scheduled for completion in 2030, giving the airport three runways, two passenger terminals and a cargo terminal designed to receive 1.5 million metric tons of cargo and 50 million passengers per year. The final stage is scheduled to be initiated after 2035, envisioned to handle 100 million passengers, 5 million metric tons of cargo annually on an infrastructure of four runways and four passenger terminals. The total budget for the first stage alone was estimated to be US$6.7 billion.

==== After the opening of Long Thanh International Airport ====
In accordance with the master planning of Vietnam's network of airports, Tan Son Nhat will continue to operate after the opening of Long Thanh International Airport. In the feasibility report for Long Thanh, Airports Corporation of Vietnam proposed that, for international carriers, only low-cost carriers would fly out of Tan Son Nhat, while for Vietnamese carriers, only short-haul international flights and selected domestic routes would be operated out of the airport. In another report, the Civil Aviation Authority of Vietnam presented a different approach to the division of flights between the two airports. As such, Tan Son Nhat would only serve flights under 1000 km operated by Code C aircraft or smaller.

=== Expansion ===
Because Long Thanh will not be ready for service until at least 2025, Tan Son Nhat must expand to meet the increasing demand. In January 2017, Airport Design and Construction Consultancy (ADCC) presented three proposals to expand the airport. Vietnam's Deputy Prime Minister Trịnh Đình Dũng agreed to proceed a US$860 million upgrade proposal for final review before submitting to the government. Under the chosen proposal, there would be a new mixed-use Terminal 3 and a civil-use Terminal 4 (to be built on the south side of the airport), a parallel taxiway between the existing runways and technical hangars on the northeast. The estimated time to complete the upgrade would be three years and the airport would then have a capacity of 43–45 million passengers annually. The decision was controversial due to the fact that the golf course immediately north of SGN would remain untouched despite the urgent need of airport expansion. The Minister of Transport Trương Quang Nghĩa explained that the airport could not be expanded northward due to costs and environmental impact. On 12 June 2017, Prime Minister Nguyễn Xuân Phúc requested the Ministry of Transport to research the prospect of constructing a third runway at Tan Son Nhut International Airport. The French consulting company ADP Ingénierie (ADPi) was subsequently hired to provide a second opinion for the project.

In March 2018, ADPi presented their plan for the expansion. The firm advised against the construction of a third runway and supported a southward expansion plan. Without a new runway, Tan Son Nhat has a maximum capacity of 51 million passengers per year – a number ADPi predicted SGN to reach in 2025, in time for the opening of Long Thanh. However, an independent consultancy of Ho Chi Minh City believed it could reach up to 80 million by the time Long Thanh was supposed to open, in accordance with reports by Boeing or the International Air Transport Association. As such, they proposed a three-phase northward expansion plan that would see a new runway and two new terminals to increase the airport's capacity to 70 million passengers per year.

On 28 March 2018, Prime Minister Nguyễn Xuân Phúc ultimately selected the ADPi proposal as the basis for the expansion of the airport. This proposal includes a new Terminal 3 with a designed capacity of 20 million passengers per year south of Runway 07R/25L, additional facilities in the north area where a golf court currently occupies as well as improvements and constructions of access points for the airport.

== See also ==
- Bombing of Tan Son Nhut Air Base
- Da Nang International Airport
- Noi Bai International Airport
- List of airports in Vietnam
