= Civil Aviation Authority of Vietnam =

- Cục Hàng không Việt Nam
- Logo of CAAV

Agency overview
- Formed: June 30, 1992; 34 years ago
- Jurisdiction: Ministry of Construction
- Motto: Cùng Niềm Tin Quốc Gia
- Website: caa.gov.vn

The Civil Aviation Authority of Vietnam (CAAV or simply CAA; Vietnamese: Cục Hàng không Việt Nam, lit. 'Department of Aviation of Vietnam') is the aviation authority under the Vietnam Ministry of Construction. It handles and regulates civil aviation in Vietnam. Among its functions are: the formulation of plans and programs to develop civil aviation; the development of legal drafts, regulations and standards relating to civil aviation; information dissemination and education on aviation law; aviation safety and security; airport, aircraft and flight management; environmental protection; search and rescue and flood prevention; ratifying air fares proposed by airlines operating in Vietnam; research and development; handling complaints and/or violations of aviation law; administrative reform; and financial and personnel affairs.

As of 2001, CAAV managed 19 airports throughout Vietnam, focusing on three main international airports: Tan Son Nhat Airport, Noi Bai Airport, and Da Nang Airport. The agency has its headquarters in Bồ Đề Ward, Hanoi.

== History ==
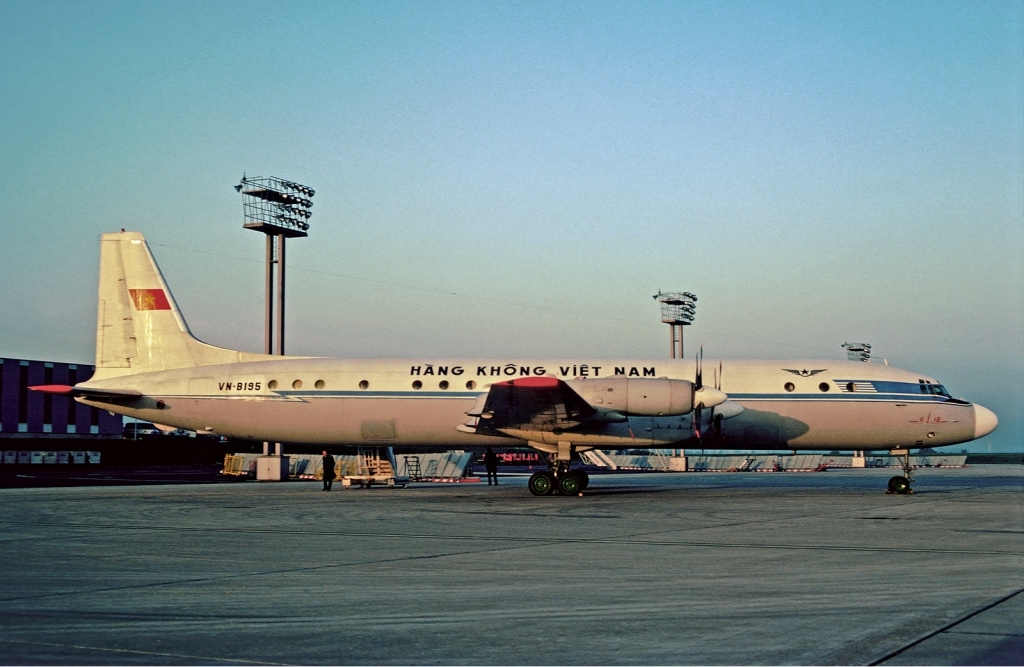
A Vietnam Civil Aviation Ilyushin Il-18 in 1987. The airline sector of Vietnam Civil Aviation was later reorganized to become the nowadays Vietnam Airlines.

The agency was founded as Vietnam Civil Aviation (Cục Hàng không Dân dụng Việt Nam) in January 1956 by the Vietnam People's Air Force (Ministry of Defense), upon the issuance of Decision No.666/TTG of the Vietnamese government. It was originally tasked with state management, national defense, and commercialization of air transportation. The aviation sector expanded greatly during its formative years, expanding from a few aircraft in what was then North Vietnam to eventually include a fleet of over 50 aircraft (including both Soviet- and American-made craft) in a unified Vietnam after 1976.

In 1976, it was upgraded and known as Civil Aviation Administration of Vietnam (Tổng cục Hàng không dân dụng Việt Nam). Infrastructure was improved during this time, as airports country-wide were equipped with better facilities and materials for flight management and operations. CAAV grew to serve around 250,000 passengers a year, both domestically and on international routes to China, Laos, Cambodia and Thailand.

A dramatic decrease in foreign aid in the early 1980s led to a crisis for the CAAV, which found itself unable to replace aging aircraft at a time when the demand for air transportation was rising. At the same time, it became apparent that years of focusing on military functions had led to a decrease in efficiency, both economically and personnel-wise. In response, the CAAV underwent a renovation in its organizational structure and culture, refocusing itself on equipment repair and maintenance, and establishing two main tasks for the civil aviation sector: air transportation and air services. To reflect its new structure, national flag carrier Vietnam Airlines was established by government decree in 1989 (Decision No.225/CT) and CAAV was directly subordinated to the Council of Ministers. In June 1992, the CAAV was transferred out to the Ministry of Transport, Post and Communications and had new name as Civil Aviation Authority of Vietnam (Cục Hàng không Dân dụng Việt Nam). Vietnam Airlines completed its restructuring programme and formally split from the Civil Aviation Administration to become a state enterprise in 1993. In 1996, Vietnam Airlines was officially incorporated with a number of aviation-related businesses into the present Vietnam Airlines Corporation. The early 1990s were a time of notable growth in the civil aviation sector of Vietnam—the sector expanded by 31% in 1995 alone. In the following years, however, the 1997 Asian financial crisis brought a downturn in growth, and further challenges to the sector.

From 2009, the authority had new name in Vietnamese (Cục Hàng không Việt Nam, lit. 'Aviation Authority of Vietnam'), but its name in English did not change.

== See also ==
- List of airlines of Vietnam
