= Joel Burns (politician) =

American politician (born 1969)

Member of the Fort Worth City Council from the 9th District
- In office January 8, 2008 – July 15, 2014
- Preceded by: Wendy Davis
- Succeeded by: Ann Zadeh

Personal details
- Born: February 4, 1969 (age 57) Fort Worth, Texas
- Spouse: J.D. Angle
- Education: Texas Wesleyan University
- Profession: realtor
- Committees: Legislative and Intergovernmental Affairs Committee, Economic and Community Development Committee, Infrastructure and Transportation Committee
- Website: http://www.joelburns.com/

Joel Burns (born February 4, 1969) is an American politician. A city councilman for District 9 in Fort Worth, Texas, he received extensive press attention in October 2010 after speaking at a council meeting about the issue of suicide among lesbian, gay, bisexual and transgender youth, as part of Dan Savage's It Gets Better campaign.

Burns announced on February 11, 2014, that he was resigning his seat on Fort Worth City Council to pursue a Master in Public Administration from the Harvard Kennedy School in Cambridge, Massachusetts. In 2010, Burns completed Harvard University's John F. Kennedy School of Government program for Senior Executives in State and Local Government as a David Bohnett LGBTQ Victory Institute Leadership Fellow. A special election to succeed him was held in May, with a runoff scheduled for June 21 in which Ann Zadeh, a former city planner, defeated attorney Ed Lasater.

Burns received his degree from the Kennedy School in 2015.

== Speech ==
In his speech, which was subsequently released on the Internet as a video, Burns spoke about his own experience as a 13-year-old boy facing bullying at school in Crowley, Texas, because of his sexual orientation. At one point in the video, he broke down and struggled to push forward with his prepared speech, eventually opting to skip a few lines. In subsequent media coverage, he confirmed that the section he skipped included an acknowledgement that he too had considered committing suicide because of the harassment he was facing.

The speech resonated throughout the Internet in a matter of minutes after Gawker had first reported the clip on its Gawker.TV website. Shortly thereafter, Burns held his first television interview on the subject with CNN's Ali Velshi, after the show aired the thirteen-minute YouTube clip in its entirety, an unprecedented occurrence for a major daytime news program. One day later, Burns and his speech were featured on scores of national and international news media, as well as NPR's All Things Considered. In under one week, the clip had garnered over one and a half million views, ultimately leading to Burns's in-studio interview with Matt Lauer on NBC's Today Show as well as an appearance on the popular Ellen DeGeneres Show. As of early August 2014, the clip has sustained over 2.9 million hits, making it one of the most-watched videos in the 'It Gets Better' campaign.

=== Weather Channel incident ===
On May 12, 2014, Burns had tweeted his observation that The Weather Channel's mobile app featured generic photos of the city of Dallas as a backdrop to Fort Worth-specific weather information. Fort Worth is often mistakenly pegged as a Dallas suburb, much to many citizens' chagrin, even though it is over 30 miles away and is considered by most residents as having its own identity and culture separate from that of Dallas. In response, the Weather Channel's official Twitter account replied directly to Burns, tweeting, "Sorry to see you go. Good luck on ending bullying."—a sarcastic reference to Burns's "It Gets Better" speech that had gone viral in 2010.

As a result, many of Burns's social media followers joined him in protesting The Weather Channel's tweet by posting photos of Fort Worth with the hashtag #THISisFortWorth aimed at The Weather Channel's Twitter account. The Weather Channel retracted the tweet and later issued an apology, saying "This morning one of our team members used sarcasm in an unfortunate and unacceptable way on our Twitter account. It was not our intention to offend and we are sorry that we did," and tweeted, "we apologize for our reply this morning. Our response was inappropriate & we're taking steps to ensure it doesn't happen again."

== Other activities ==
In 2009, on the 40th anniversary of the Stonewall Riots, the Texas Alcoholic Beverage Commission conducted a raid on a Fort Worth gay club (see Rainbow Lounge raid), prompting a large public outpouring of anger towards the Commission and the Fort Worth Police Department. During a very heated City Council meeting shortly after the raid, Joel Burns reassured many of the gay Dallas-area protesters in attendance that the City of Fort Worth will not allow such intolerance to continue and vowed to create a GLBT Liaison within the Fort Worth Police Department.

Burns was first elected to Fort Worth City Council in 2007 in a special election, during which a sitting city council-member, Chuck Silcox (who is now deceased), campaigned for Burns's opponent Chris Turner because Turner was straight. The election was called when his predecessor, Wendy Davis, vacated her council seat to seek election, ultimately successfully, to the Texas Senate. Both straight and gay voters of Fort Worth's District 9 overwhelmingly voted for Burns despite the political homophobic remarks. He was elected to a full term in the 2009 municipal election. He was the first openly gay person ever elected to political office in Tarrant County.

Boards and Commissions Burns has served on:

- District 9 Commissioner on the City of Fort Worth Zoning Commission
- Past Chairman of the City of Fort Worth Historic and Cultural Landmark Commission
- Tarrant County Housing Partnership, Board Secretary
- Historic Fort Worth, Inc

Neighborhood and other groups:

- Fort Worth Central-City Redevelopment Committee
- Fort Worth South, Inc. Development Committee
- Greater Fort Worth Association of Realtors
- Leadership Fort Worth
- Ryan Place and Fairmount neighborhood associations

== See also ==
- LGBT rights in Texas
