= Queer Liberaction =

Texan organisation for LGBT rights advocacy

- Type: grassroots activism, non-violent direct action
- Region served: Dallas–Fort Worth, Texas (USA)
- Website: www.QueerLiberaction.org

Queer Liberaction (QL) is a Dallas–Fort Worth, Texas-based grassroots organization advocating for lesbian, gay, bisexual, and transgender (LGBT) rights. The group was founded in November 2008 following the international attention surrounding California's Proposition 8, which changed that state's Constitution to deny marriage rights to any LGBT couples who are not defined as "a man and a woman", passed by a slight majority. The organization is a proponent of same-sex marriage rights for LGBT couples, considering civil unions and domestic partnerships as less than full equality.

The organization's campaigns and actions utilize visible, confrontational styles and non-violent direct action.

== Background ==
Proposition 8 was the most expensive initiative in U.S. history with each side spending in excess of $35 million. California had recently allowed same-sex marriage and within six months 18,000 couples had wed. After the election, non-heterosexual marriages were immediately halted, efforts to legally challenge the proposition started and nationwide protests against the proposition's passage took place. Polls showed that regular churchgoers sided in favor of the measure by a ratio of more than 4 to 1 and made up nearly one-quarter of the voters. In addition the Church of Jesus Christ of Latter-day Saints (Mormons), was noted for protests for its strong support both financially and in volunteers for its participation.

Founders and members of the group are inspired and influenced by the Stonewall riots in the late 1960s, the activism and organizing work of San Francisco's Castro activist Harvey Milk who was assassinated in 1978; the White Night riots in the aftermath of the Milk's murderer trial; and the HIV/AIDS activism of the 1980s and early 1990s.

QL has been more willing to challenge anti-LGBT churches and religious organizations than more established LGBT rights groups have traditionally done. First Baptist Church in downtown Dallas and various LDS churches, all of which have been outspoken in their opposition to LGBT rights, have been directly focussed on by the group.

== Organization and mission ==
Volunteers run the organization and the events, unlike most modern LGBT events such as pride parades, avoid heavy involvement with corporate sponsors and commercial opportunities. The group keeps most events sparse and focussed on First Amendment Free Speech issues which typically do not require permitting. QL generally organizes online with Internet services such as Facebook, MySpace, Twitter, e-mail, and other websites.

The group's mission statement reads, in part, "Homophobia is the foundation of queer inequality and oppression. In order to liberate ourselves from this oppression, we must directly, visbly, and publicly confront it along with organizations, institutions, groups or individuals who support or promote discrimination towards the Queer community. [...] We do not ask for equality. We demand it."

== Campaigns/actions ==
Named for pioneering LGBT activist and community organizer Harvey Milk, the "Milk Box" is a modern soap box placed on busy street corners for people to stand upon and voice their opinions whether in agreement or opposition to the views of QL. At first the box was placed in Oak Lawn, the traditional gay strip of Dallas, but has since been used throughout the city.

The group also stages same-sex kiss-ins in public, which is rarely seen outside the gay neighborhoods. At these events same gendered couples publicly kiss. QL staged a public same-sex marriages as part of National Freedom to Marry Day to draw attention to the fact that these marriages are not legal according to Texas law. Texas also does not offer civil unions or domestic partnerships.

QL intended to protest at the main Dallas post office on April 15, 2009 (U.S. tax day) to highlight the higher taxes LGBT couples incurred due to their inability to legally marry at the time. A postal inspector would not allow them to gather on post office grounds, so they held the protest east of the post office.

== Rainbow Lounge police raid ==
Just past midnight, in the early morning hours of June 28, 2009, a newly opened gay bar, the Rainbow Lounge, in Fort Worth, Texas was raided by members of the Texas Alcoholic Beverage Commission (TABC) and the Fort Worth Police. Patrons of the bar were celebrating the 40th anniversary of the Stonewall Riots of 1969, generally considered the birth of the modern LGBT civil rights movement. Several customers were arrested for public intoxication and one customer received a severe head and brain injury while in custody. The police also claimed the customers made sexual advances and contact with them, which was disputed by all witnesses. Other customers were detained and later released without arrest. QL organized a protest at the Fort Worth Court House by 7pm the same day. The protest was covered by all local TV news shows and all local newspapers, and was reported internationally. In response to the raid, QL organized a protest, a candelight vigil for the victim, a Milk Box event, and a later more formal protest.

== See also ==
- Gay Liberation
- LGBT rights in the United States
- LGBT rights in Texas
- Freedom of speech in the United States
