= Rainbow Lounge raid =

2009 raid on a gay bar in Texas, US

The Rainbow Lounge raid occurred in the early morning hours of June 28, 2009, at the Rainbow Lounge, a newly opened gay bar in Fort Worth, Texas. The raid was carried out by members of the Texas Alcoholic Beverage Commission (TABC) and the Fort Worth Police Department. Several customers were arrested for public intoxication and one customer, Chad Gibson, received a severe head and brain injury while in custody. The police also claimed the customers made sexual advances and contact with them. Other customers were detained and later released without arrest.

In response to this incident, several of the witnesses in the bar that evening, including Todd Camp, the artistic director of the local gay and lesbian film festival, began a grassroots awareness campaign with the launch of the informational Facebook page "Rainbow Lounge Raid." Over the next several weeks, the page's membership grew to nearly 15,000. Several local organizers planned a protest on the steps of the Tarrant County Courthouse the next afternoon. The Dallas-based LGBT rights group Queer Liberaction organized a candlelight vigil for the victim, a Milk Box event, and a later more formal protest.

It has been of particular interest to the media that the raid took place on the 40th anniversary of the Stonewall Riots, a notable raid of a gay bar which prompted the modern gay rights movement. The address of the club, 651 South Jennings Avenue, was a classic location of gay bars in Fort Worth. The club was destroyed by a fire eight years later.

== Responses ==
At the City of Fort Worth's first council meeting since the Rainbow Lounge Raid, and after an attendee of the meeting called out for an apology, the Mayor apologized for the events at the Rainbow Lounge. The next day after the apology was reported nationally and internationally, the Mayor said the apology was taken out of context and that he was referring to the injury not the actual raid.

As a result of the raid, the Texas Alcoholic Beverage Commission fired three individuals and disciplined two others. The agency also completed some previously scheduled changes including increased cultural diversity training.

A separate "Use of Force" investigation determined that two charges: (a) "that the Rainbow Lounge was targeted for being a gay bar", and (b) that TABC officers "used force beyond what was necessary and reasonable", were both unfounded. However, TABC Administrator Alan Steen announced that "TABC's five regional Educational Liaisons are being re-named Community Liaisons, and will be tasked with reaching out to diverse community groups including GLBT organizations as well as associations representing racial, ethnic and religious minorities." Steen also appointed TABC's Director of Communications and Governmental Relations as the agency's liaison to the GLBT community "in an effort to improve communication around the state."

== Aftermath ==
Dallas-based independent filmmaker Robert L. Camina documented the aftermath of the raid and produced the feature Raid of the Rainbow Lounge, which premiered in March 2012. Emmy-nominated actress Meredith Baxter narrates the film.

The Rainbow Lounge was destroyed by a fire on June 1, 2017. Firefighters arrived after 3 a.m. local time and battled the fire from the outside. They found the inside too dangerous to extinguish it. When CBS News reported, firefighters were still battling the fire before 6 a.m. local time.

== See also ==
- LGBT rights in Texas
- Stonewall riots
