= Kyle Forti =

American political consultant (1989–2019)

Kyle John Forti (1989 – March 3, 2019) was an American political consultant, active in Colorado.

== Education ==
In 2012, Forti graduated from Hillsdale College in Michigan with degrees in Political Science and Christian Studies.

== Career ==
In 2013, Forti founded and became president of Peak Political Solutions. In 2014, Forti was named by Red Alert Politics on a “30 Under 30” list of conservative rising stars. In 2015, Forti co-founded D/CO Consulting, a political and public relations firm based in Denver, Colorado, alongside Caleb Bonham. Forti has worked for and managed the campaigns of many Republican politicians in Colorado. Forti was described as a "prolific figure in Colorado Republican politics".

== Personal life ==
Kyle Forti was married to Hope Forti, who founded Foster Together Colorado in 2018, which is a nonprofit that supports foster families. He also had two children.

== Death ==
Forti died on March 3, 2019, in a helicopter crash in Kenya. The Bell 505 helicopter crashed shortly after takeoff from Central Island National Park near Lake Turkana. Four American tourists and the Kenyan pilot died.
