= Caleb Bonham =

American businessman and television personality

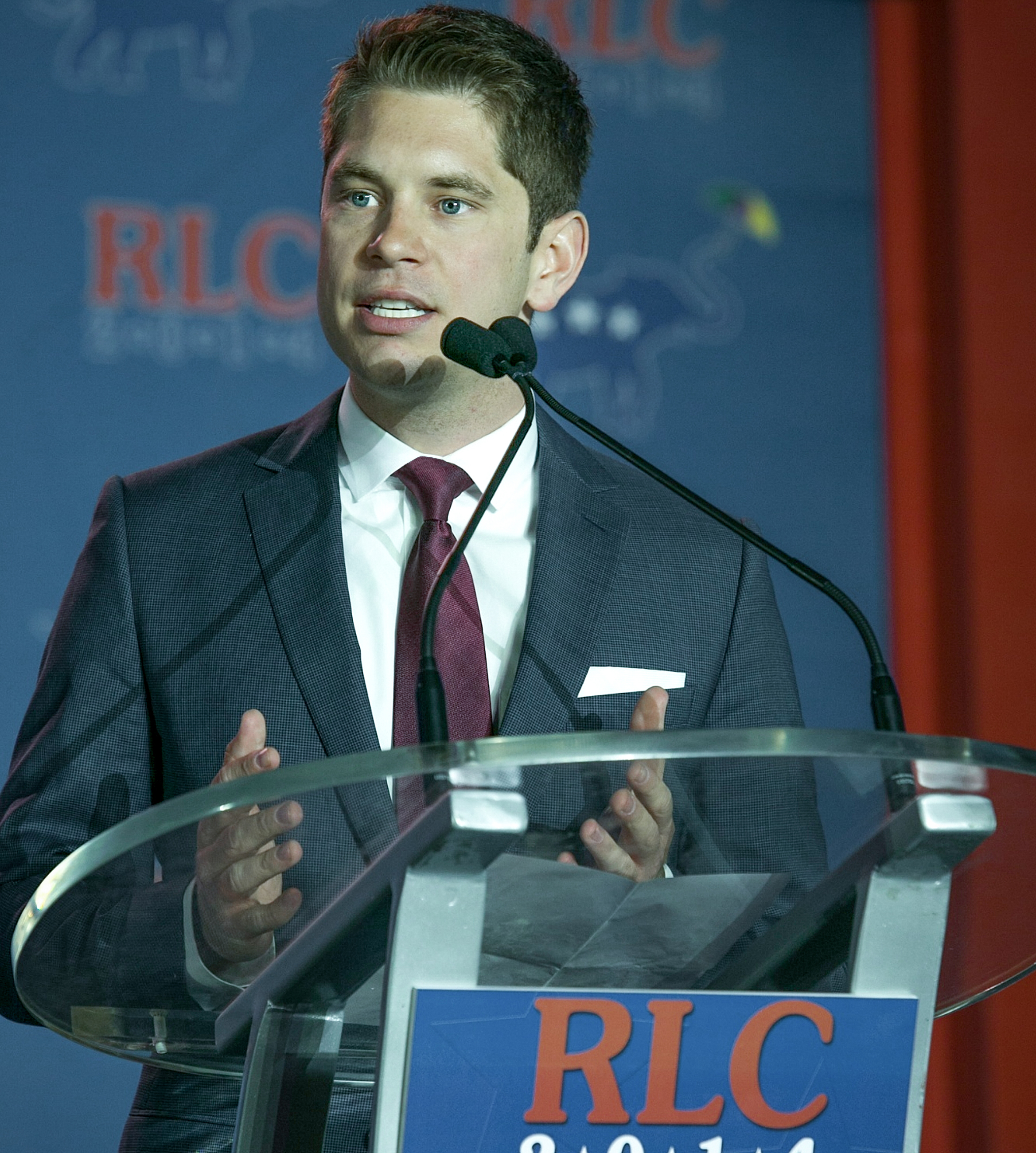
- Bonham in 2017
- Born: Caleb Stephen Bonham; November 7, 1986 (age 38); Fort Collins, Colorado, US
- Education: Colorado State University
- Occupation: Senior Partner at DCO Consulting
- Known for: Campus Reform, DCO Consulting

Caleb Bonham (born November 7, 1986) is an American businessman and television personality in Denver, Colorado. A frequent commentator on the Fox News Channel, Bonham regularly offers political and business commentary expressing his millennial views as they relate to educational and economic issues.

Bonham is currently the president of D/CO Consulting, a firm he co-founded in 2015 alongside Kyle Forti, which advises Fortune 500 companies and political figures.

== Early life and career ==
Caleb Bonham is from Fort Collins, Colorado. He graduated with a B.A. in political science and a minor in Business Administration from Colorado State University and began his career working at the Colorado State Capitol for Representative Brian DelGrosso.

Bonham previously served as the editor-in-chief of Campus Reform, a college-based conservative news website that reports on "leftist bias and abuse on the nation's college campuses." In 2014, Red Alert Politics named Caleb to their list of the 30 most influential right-of-center leaders under the age of 30.

As a guest on numerous television and radio programs, Bonham has appeared on The Kelly File, Anderson Cooper 360, The Situation Room with Wolf Blitzer, On The Record with Greta Van Susteren, National Public Radio, The Rush Limbaugh Show, Fox and Friends, and Hannity.

== Personal life ==
Bonham has been public about his diagnosis of Tourette syndrome (TS) and the impact it has had on his career.

On May 12, 2015, Bonham was aboard Amtrak train 188, which derailed in Philadelphia resulting in the death of eight passengers. In an interview with CNN, Bonham told Anderson Cooper that he was "fortunate to be able to walk away from the Amtrak train derailment alive."
