= Vietnam Helicopters =

Vietnamese helicopter company

Vietnam Helicopter Corporation

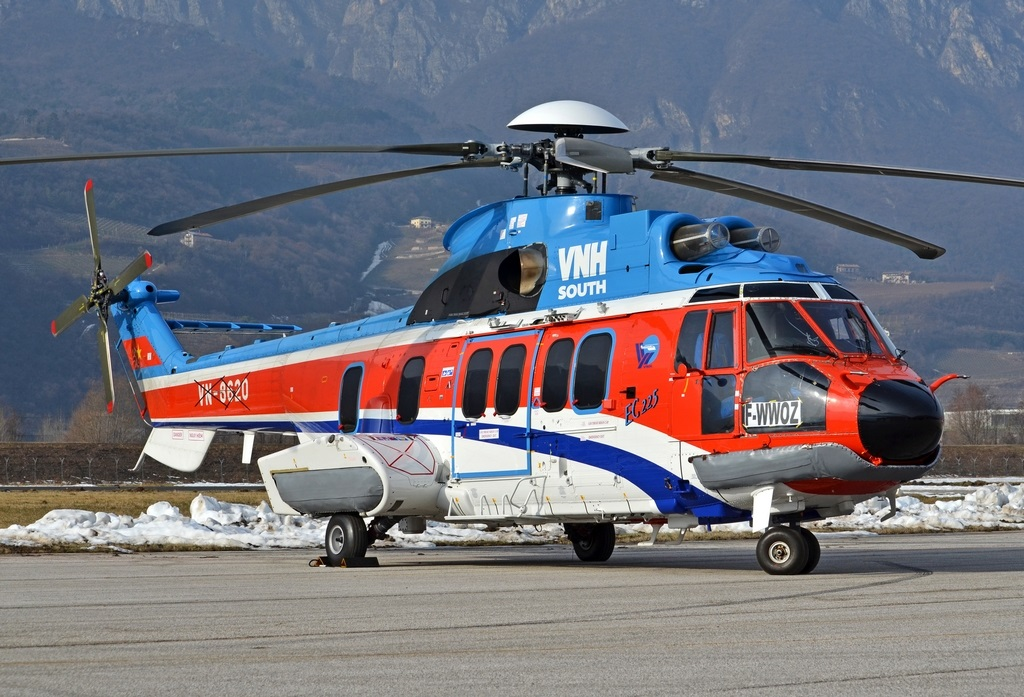
| IATA | ICAO | Call sign |
|---|---|---|
| - | - | VIETNAM HELICOPTERS |
- Founded: 20 April 1979
- Commenced operations: 31 January 1989
- Operating bases: Ha Long Airport - Quảng Ninh; Nuoc Man Airport - Đà Nẵng; Vung Tau Airport
- Subsidiaries: VNH North; VNH Central; VNH South
- Destinations: More than 20
- Headquarters: Hanoi
- Website: http://www.vnh.com.vn/en/home.php

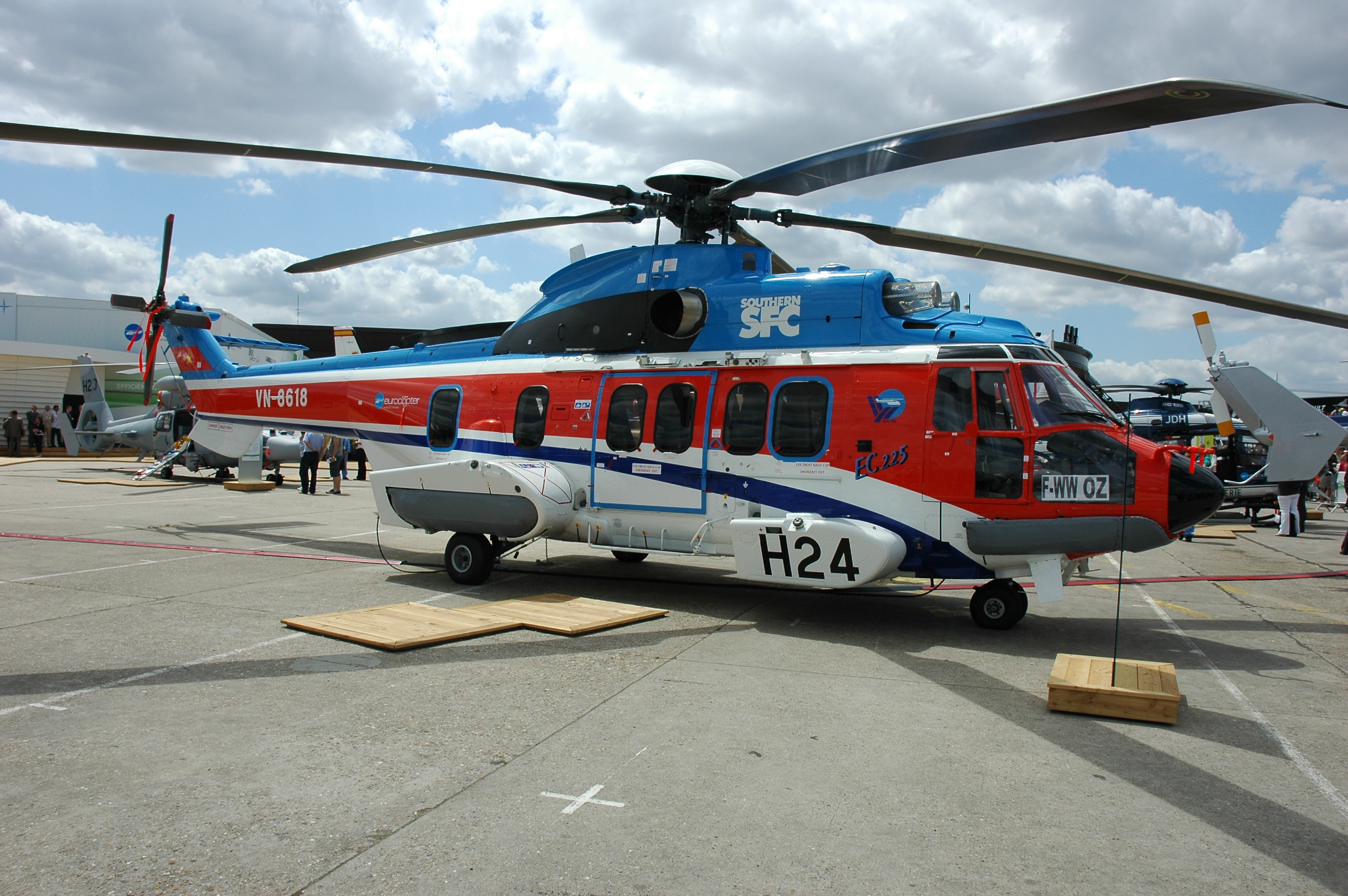
A Eurocopter EC225 Super Puma of the Southern SFC, now VNH South.

Vietnam Helicopters (VNH), formally the Vietnam Helicopter Corporation (VNH Corp or VHC; Vietnamese: Tổng công ty Trực thăng Việt Nam - Công ty TNHH, lit. 'Vietnam Helicopter Corporation - LLC'), also known by its military designation Corps 18 (Vietnamese: Binh đoàn 18), is a transportation business owned by the Vietnam Ministry of National Defense. It operates helicopters to transport cargo, train pilots and export/import devices in the aviation industry,operate MIA recovery operations,as well as providing aircraft maintenance while offering commercial services such as tourist transportation. Being a state-owned enterprise and a formally a combat unit under the People's Army of Vietnam, VNH also operates government-sponsored flights serving civil defense purposes including medical evacuation as well as search and rescue missions.

== History ==
The company was founded on 20 April 1979. The first flight squad of the Vietnam Air Force for oil and gas services was set up on 13 September 1983. In March 1985, Helicopter Vietnam was established. In 1989, the Service Flight Corporation of Vietnam was established by the Vietnamese Government with Northern Service Flight Company and Southern Service Flight Company as subsidiaries.

In 2007, the Service Flight Corporation of Vietnam expanded with a new subsidiary, Hai Au Company, in addition to Northern Service Flight Company as well as Southern Service Flight Company. It has one joint venture, Bien Hoa Helicopters, a maintenance and repair company. In 2010, Service Flight Corporation of Vietnam was renamed the Vietnam Helicopter Corporation.

== Operations ==
VNH operates a fleet of 28 aircraft with the capacity to carry between 4 and 24 passengers .

=== Petroleum exploration ===
VNH is the first company in Vietnam to provide aviation transport for employees in the oil and gas industry in Vietnam. Over three decades, VNH has provided aviation transport services for more than 30 companies, including Vietsovpetro, Premier Oil, BHP, Petronas, BP and Chevron.

=== Charter flights ===
VNH flies 50+ routes to destinations such as Hạ Long, Cat Bi, Móng Cái, Lào Cai, Sa Pa, Hòa Bình, Thanh Hóa, Vinh, Huế, Da Nang, Vũng Tàu, Côn Đảo, Cà Mau and Phú Quốc.

=== Pilot training ===
VNH Training Center is Ministry of Defense-certified as a training center. It trains pilots, ground services staff, aviation engineering staff, and pilots on its modern group of aircraft including the EC225, Super Puma AS-322 L2, EC155 B1, Mi-172, and the Mi-17-1V.The VNH Training Center has trained its own staff along with the Vietnam People's Air Force, and the Vietnam People's Navy. Trainers themselves were trained by helicopter companies in Hong Kong and Malaysia.

=== Missing in Action program ===
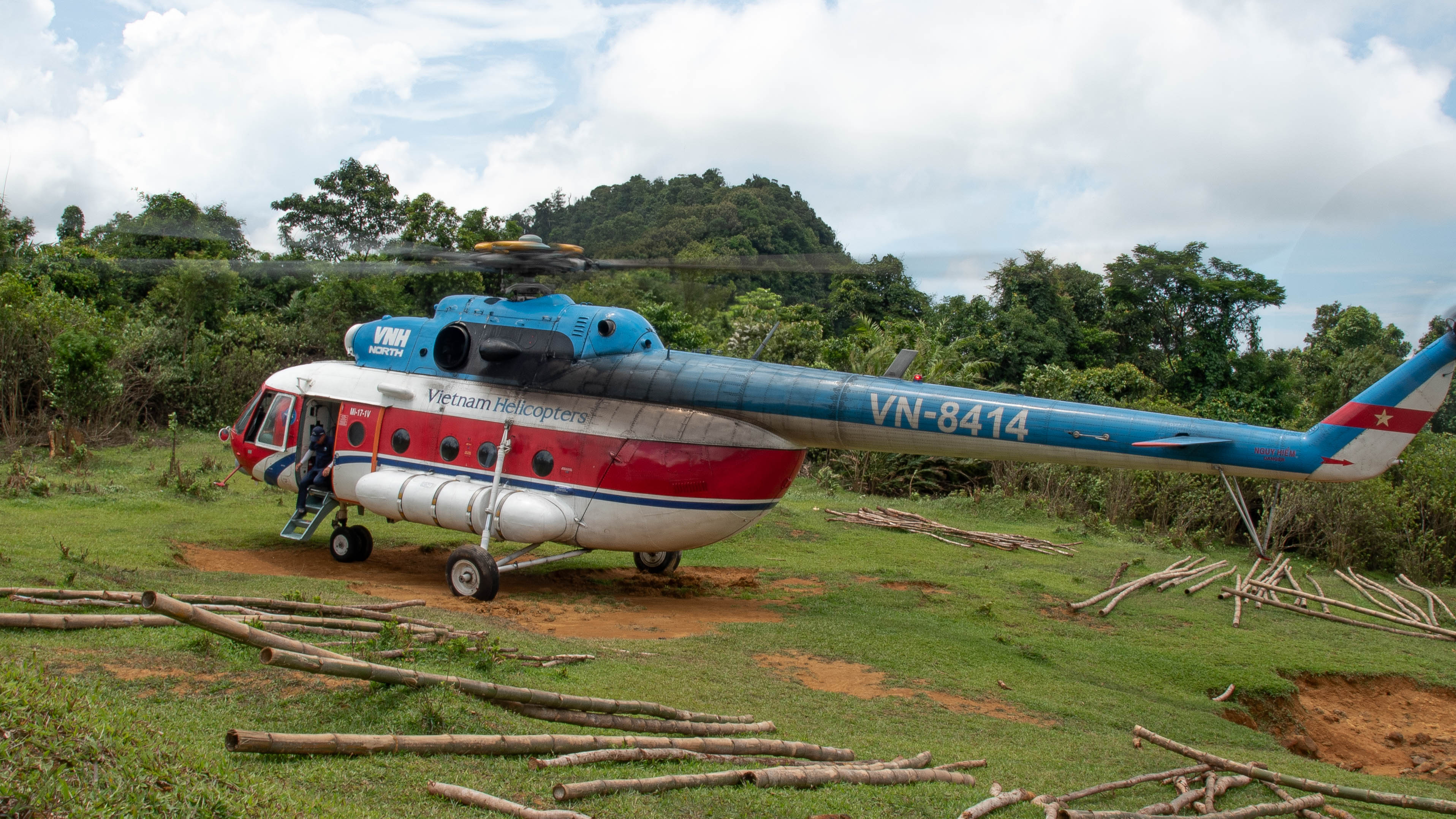
A Mil Mi-17-1V of VNH North serving a MIA recovery operation in Hà Tĩnh province, 2025.

The MIA program started as flights to search for missing Americans following the Vietnam War. The MIA program was established between the United States and the VNH on 18 April 1990. VNH has flown more than 100 searches throughout Vietnam, including many over dangerous regions and in hazardous weather conditions. These actions contributed to the normalization of United States–Vietnam relations.

=== Maintenance engineering services ===
The aeronautical engineering centers of VNH: Northern Vietnam Helicopter Company, Southern Service Flight Company and Helicopter Technical Services Corporation (Helitechco) are licensed by the AMO aircraft maintenance organization of Civil Aviation Administration of Vietnam. Helitechco is the only engineering center in Asia that has been ratified by the MIL Institute to maintain Russian-made Mi-type aircraft. More than 200 CAAV certified-staff are undergoing training at universities and colleges in domestic and international aviation. Engineers and technical staff attend courses in the operation and maintenance for helicopters in Russia and France as well as planes including the EC225, Super Puma AS-322 L2, EC155 B1, Mi-172 and Mi-17-1V. Helitechco and aeronautical engineering centers of VNH can:

- Overhaul Mi-type of plane with technical maintenance for 500 hours
- Technical maintenance for more than 2200 hours for the EC225, Super Puma AS-322 L2 and EC155 B1.
- Accessory maintenance for Eurocopter and Mi planes

=== Other services ===
- Tourism, aerial photography, cargo sling; MEDEVAC, search and rescue
- Subcontracting operations services, pilots and mechanics for other helicopter owners
- National security and defense
- General businesses: office and warehouse leasing; supply and transportation of aviation fuel; forwarding logistics services

== Fleet ==
- Eurocopter EC225
- Eurocopter AS332 L2 Super Puma
- AugustaWestland AW189
- Eurocopter EC155 B1
- Mi-172
- Mi-17-1V
- Cabri G2
- Eurocopter EC130T2
- Bell 505 Jet Ranger X (VN-8650 crashed in 5 April 2023)

== Subsidiaries ==
- Northern Vietnam Helicopter Company (VNH North), based in Gia Lam airport, Hanoi.
- Central Vietnam Helicopter Company (VNH Central), based in Danang International Airport and Nuoc Man Helibase, Danang.
- Southern Vietnam Helicopter Company (VNH South), based in Vũng Tàu Airport, Vung Tau.

== Accidents ==
- On 7 April 2001, a Mi-17 helicopter crashed in Quang Binh province while conducting a US Missing in Action program mission, killing all 16 people on board (including 9 Americans).
- On 18 October 2016, a Eurocopter EC130 crashed near Vung Tau while conducting training flight, killing 3 crew members.
- On 5 April 2023, a Bell 505 on a sightseeing flight crashed in Ha Long Bay, killing the pilot and four tourists.
