= Bell 505 Jet Ranger X =

Single-turbine light helicopter

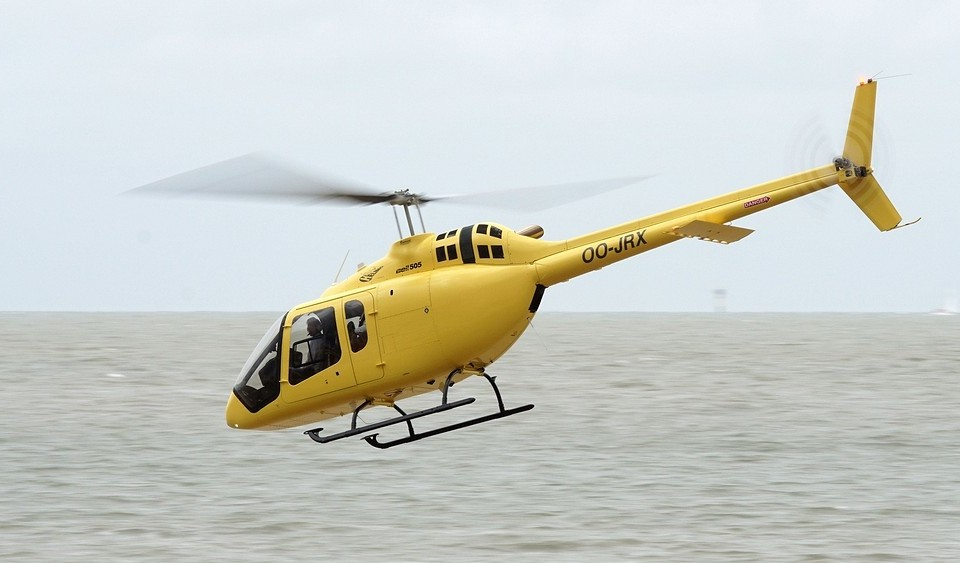
- Bell 505 in 2018

General information
- Type: Light helicopter
- National origin: United States / Canada
- Manufacturer: Bell Textron
- Status: In service
- Number built: 505 (November 2023)

History
- Manufactured: 2014–present
- Introduction date: March 7, 2017
- First flight: November 10, 2014

The Bell 505 Jet Ranger X (JRX) is an American/Canadian light helicopter developed and manufactured by Bell Helicopter. The Bell 505 was unveiled at the 2013 Paris Airshow in June 2013 as the Bell SLS (Short Light Single). The Bell 505 designation was officially announced in February 2014. Its first flight occurred on November 11, 2014. The helicopter was certified by Transport Canada in December 2016. By 2023 about 500 have been sold. Popular uses include personal travel, sightseeing, law enforcement, and student training.

== Design and development ==
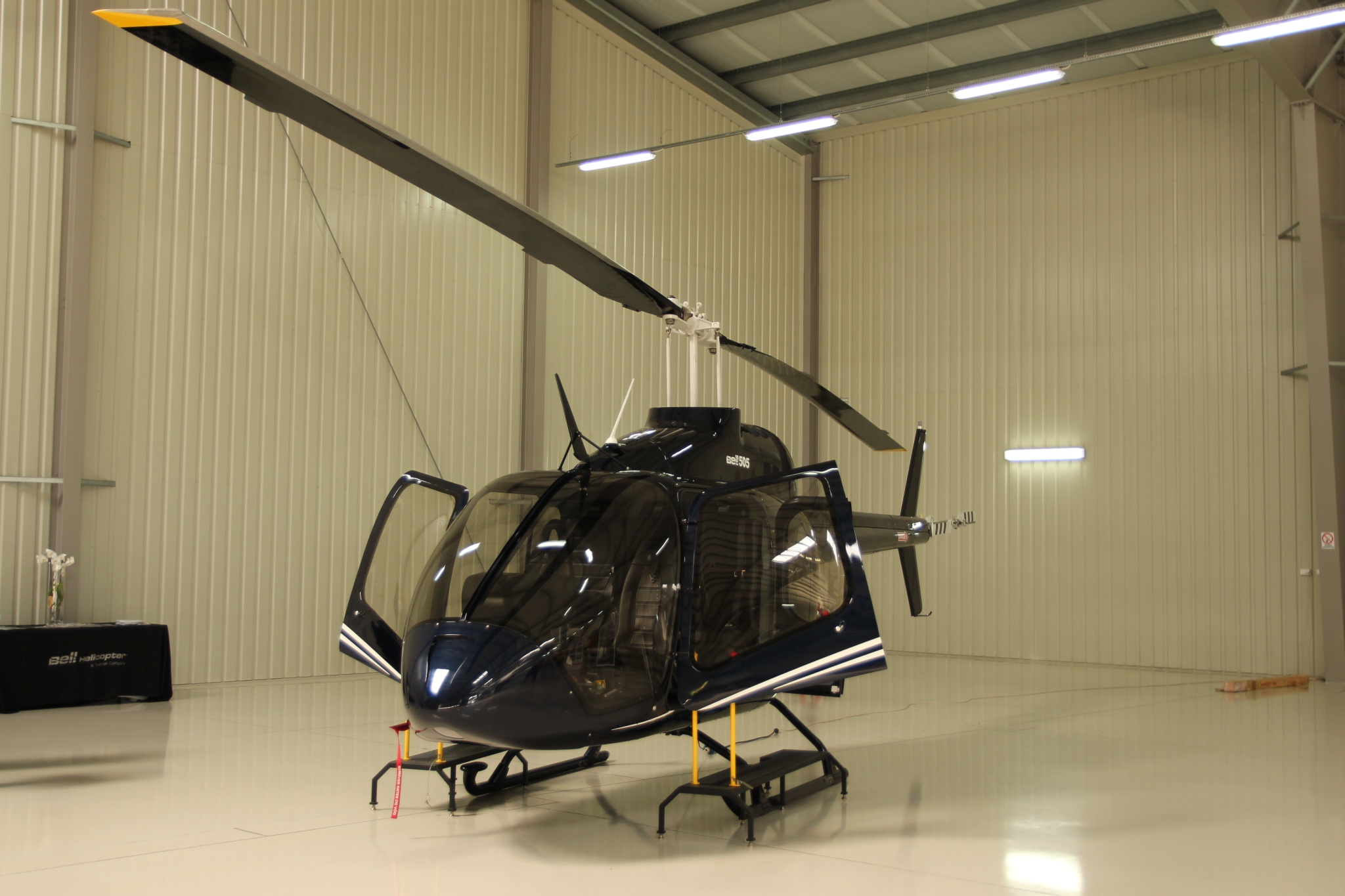
A Bell 505 mockup in 2015

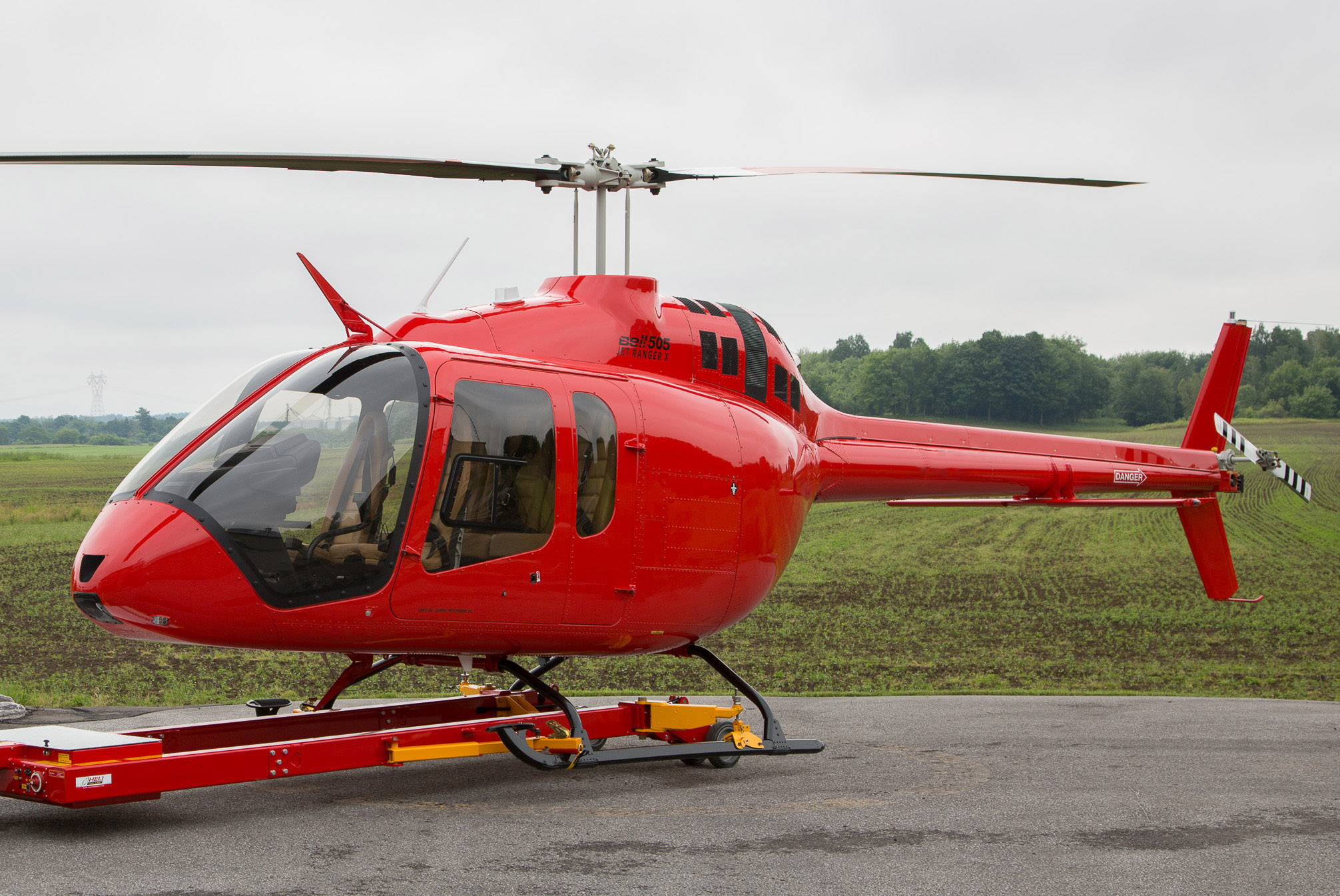
Bell 505 on trailer, 2017

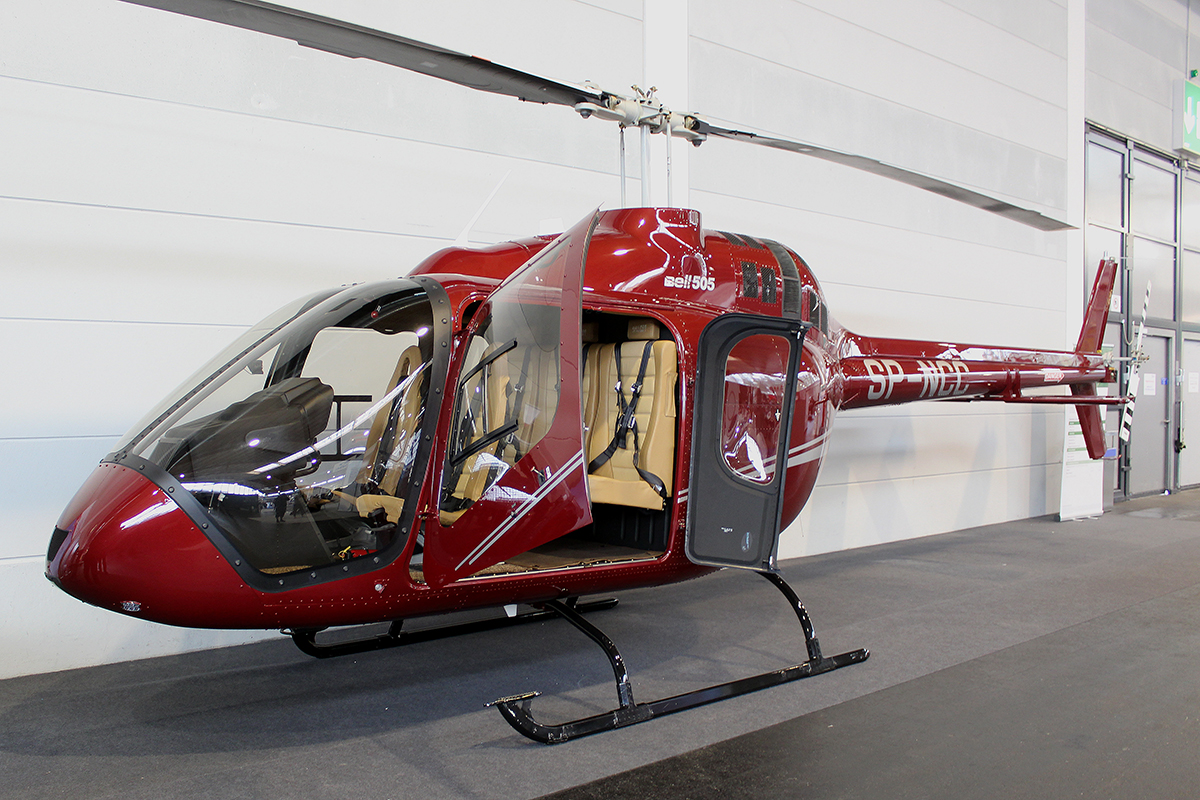
Cabin with doors open

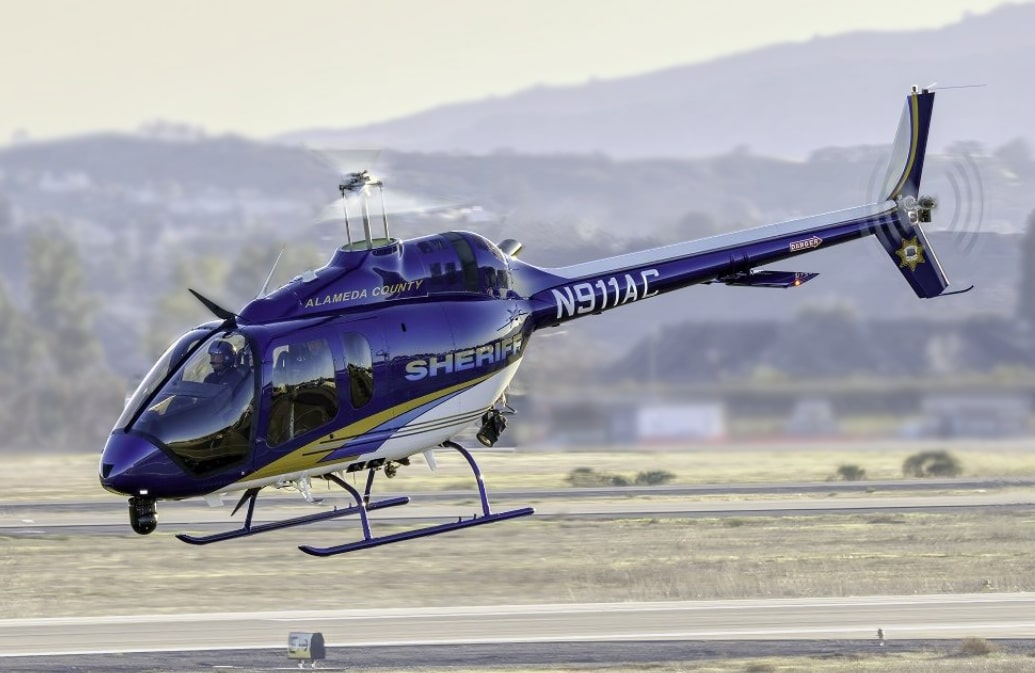
A Bell 505 belonging to the Alameda County Sheriff's Office

The helicopter was unveiled at the 2013 Paris Airshow on June 17, 2013, as the Bell SLS (Short Light Single). The model designation was later announced at HAI Heli-Expo 2014 in Anaheim, California on February 25, 2014.

The Bell 505 is a "clean sheet" design, but uses some dynamic components, such as the rotor system, of the Bell 206L-4. The airframe is constructed of metal and composites, and has a 22-square-foot (2.04 m^{2}) flat floor and an 18-cubic-foot (0.51 m^{3}) luggage bay. The Safran Arrius 2R is used with a dual-channel FADEC and a 3,000-hour Time-between-overhaul. The 505 cockpit is equipped with the Garmin G1000H glass avionics suite. Various options such as a cargo hook are available.

Main production started in 2016 in an 82,300-square-foot (7,646 m^{2}), $26.3 million hangar facility at Lafayette Regional Airport in Louisiana, but the tooling was created for assembly in different places in the world. Louisiana offered $8 million in support for 250 new jobs, and started construction of the factory in August 2014 which was then leased to Bell. The factory opened in August 2015.

On May 19, 2016, Bell Helicopter CEO Mitch Snyder announced changes to the production supply chain that included relocating the Bell 505 production to Bell Helicopter's assembly and distribution center in Mirabel, Quebec, Canada. The Lafayette Assembly Center, which was specifically designed to manufacture and deliver the 505, will instead complete Bell 525 sub-assemblies and perform work on Northrop Grumman MQ-8C Fire Scout UAVs.

Initial assembly, flight testing and certification started in Canada while the factory was being built in the US. First flight went to 60 knots on November 11, 2014, and the second test aircraft flew in February 2015. Bell said they had 240 letters of intent (LOI) (50 from Europe) for the 505 in October 2014, and in November Chinese tourism operator Reignwood increased their LOI from 10 to 60 of the type. In August 2015, Bell had 350 letters of intent.

Certification by Transport Canada was awarded on December 21, 2016. In the US, it was certified in June 2017.

In 2023, The Bell 505 was the first single-engine helicopter to fly using SAF fuel.

== Sales, production and operations ==
The first customer aircraft was delivered on March 7, 2017, to a private operator in Arizona, United States. In February 2018, the first 505 was delivered to Japan. The first 505 configured for law enforcement was delivered in 2018 to the Sacramento Police Department in California; the Police version has a number of enhancements including an Electro-Optic/Infrared sensor, searchlight, loudhailer, external hardpoints, and a higher skid gear.

The Bell 505 has become a military training helicopter for several countries by 2023, including South Korea, Indonesia, Jamaica, Japan, UAE, Montenegro, and Jordan.

The 505 was certified by the Federal Aviation Administration in June 2017 and received high altitude certification (22,500 feet density altitude) in June 2019. Bell delivered the 100th 505 Jet Ranger X in June 2018, and the 200th in August 2019. 360 (March 2022) By November 2023, the 505th Bell 505 was delivered.

== Accidents and incidents ==
- On March 3, 2019, a Bell 505 crashed shortly after taking off from Central Island National Park, Kenya. The pilot and four passengers were killed in the accident. Kyle Forti, an American political consultant, was one of the passengers that died in the crash.
- In 2022 in Queensland, a fan shaft bearing failure led to the failure of the tail shaft. The Australian authorities, working with Bell, could not find a deeper issue, but did note that odd mechanical sounds can be a sign of imminent hardware failure.
- In early 2023, State-owned Vietnam Helicopters had a crash in the UNESCO World Heritage site Ha Long Bay, with five fatalities; this led the Civil Aviation Authority in Vietnam to suspend helicopter airtours. The Vietnamese Ministry of Transport established a probe into the crash. Hundreds of searchers were mobilized and the black box from the crashed Bell 505 was successfully recovered in April 2023. The helicopter crashed in the water about 50 meters/yards from a fishing boat, and witness reported the helicopter was making a croaking sound and spiraling, before it impacted the water and exploded. Bell and the Transportation Safety Board of Canada were in contact with the Vietnamese CAAV to aid for assistance; at the time of the crash the helicopter was flight certified in Vietnam, and also the US, Canada, and Europe. The helicopter was flown by a pilot with a valid commercial license in Vietnam, who had successfully flown over 2600 trips, it was one of two Bell 505 operated by the sightseeing airline.
- On July 30, 2024, a Bell 505 JRX crashed near Killucan, County Westmeath, Ireland. The helicopter's two occupants died in the crash.

== Operators ==
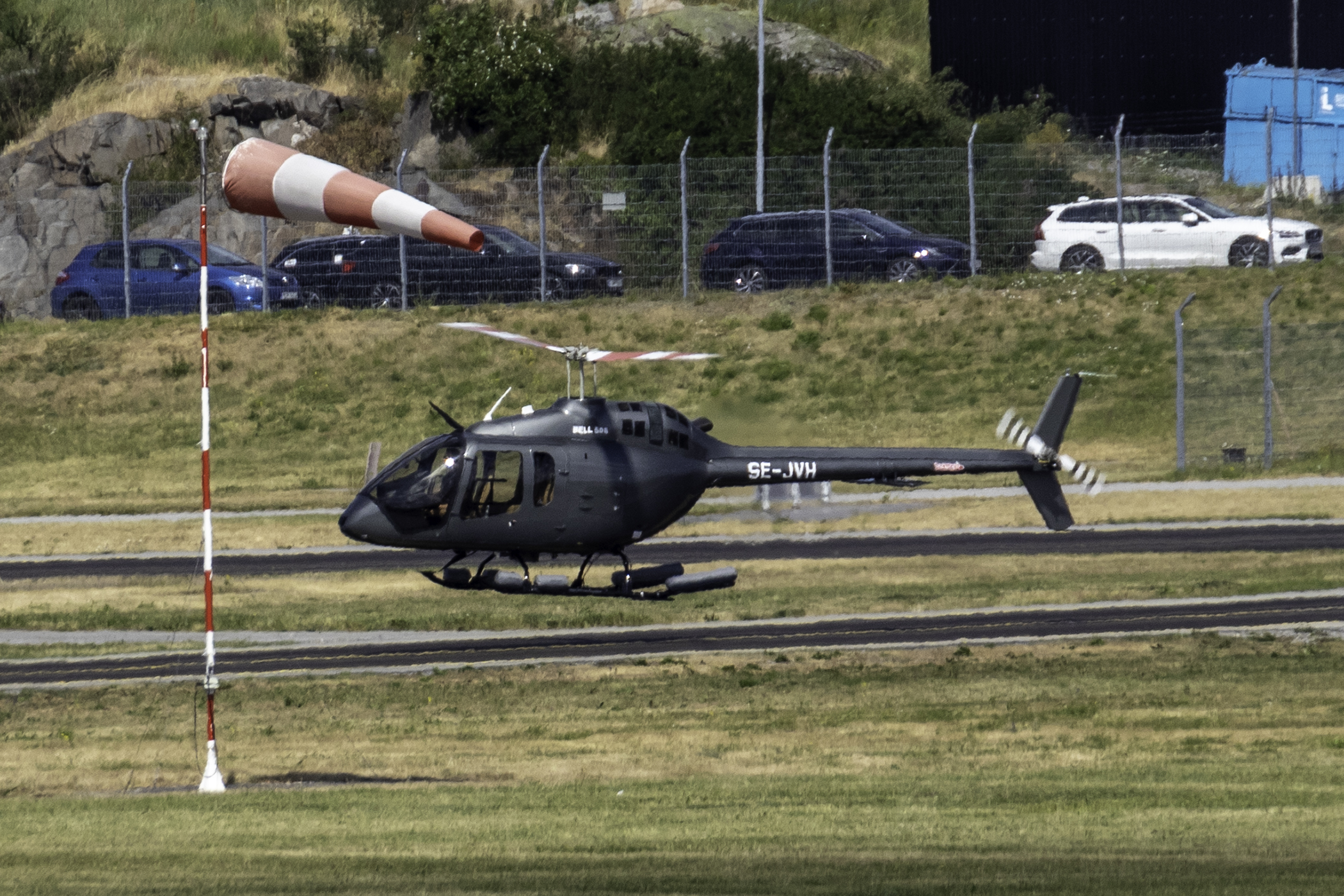
At Stockholm Bromma Airport, Sweden

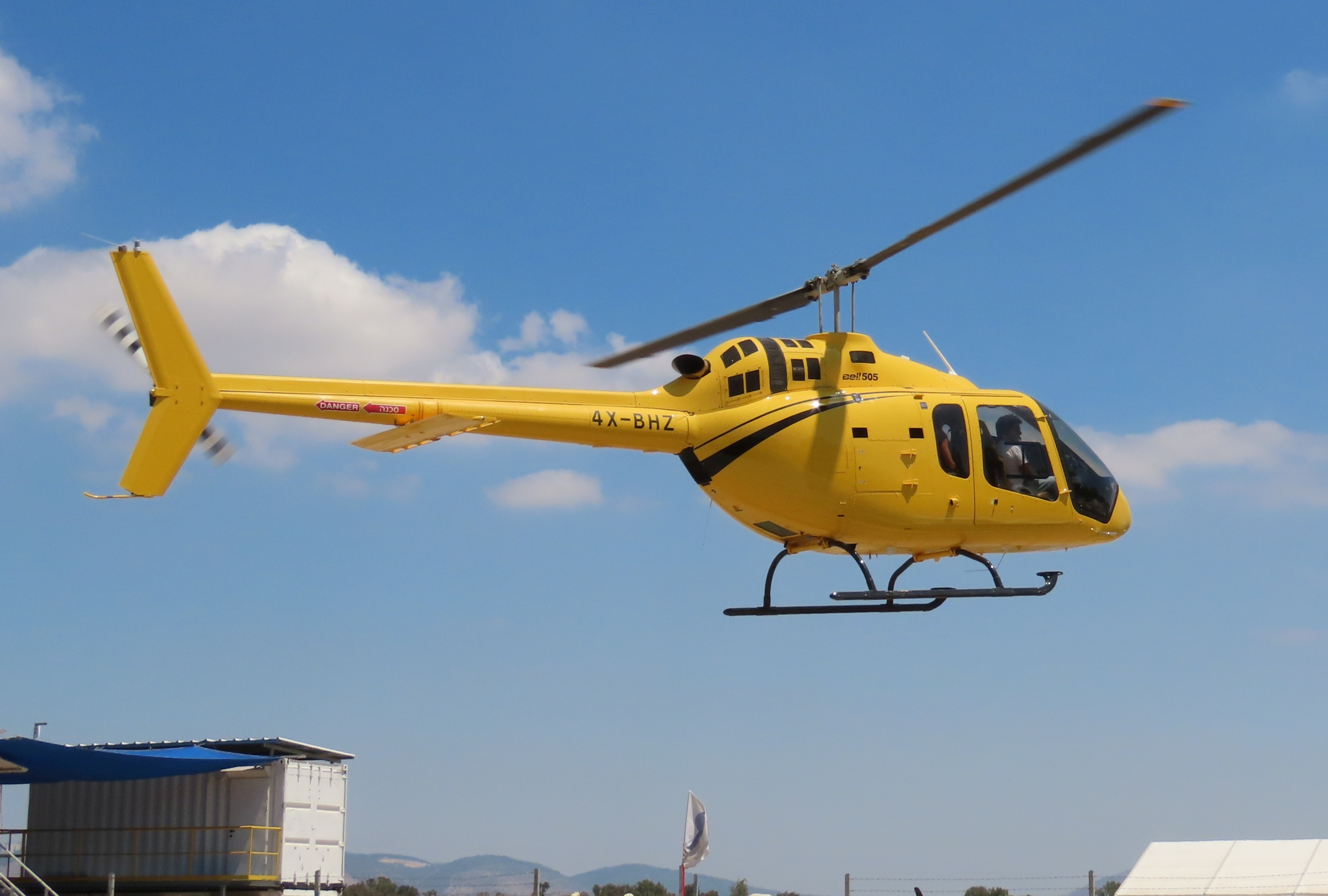
Bell 505 at Meggido Airfield

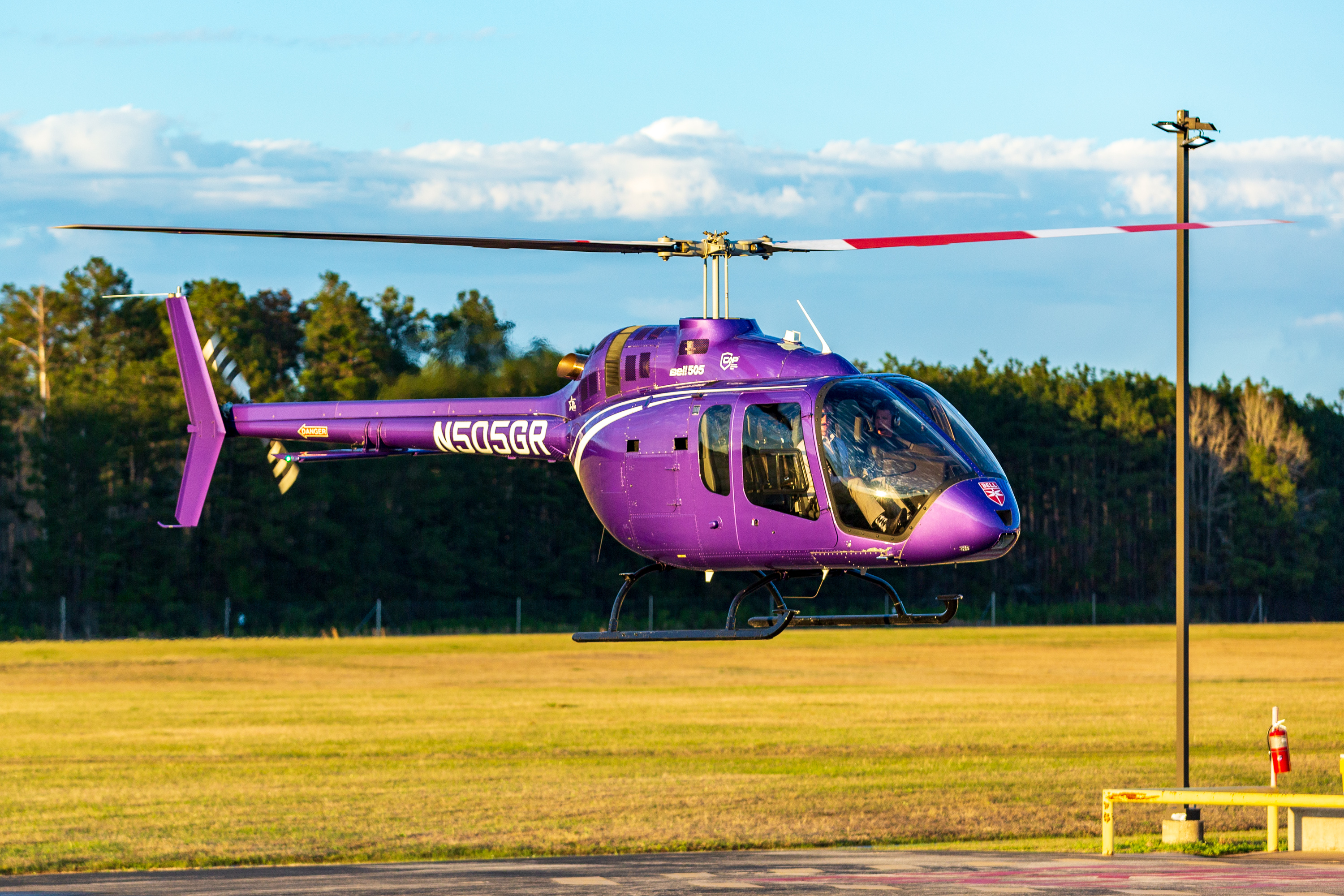
Bell 505 in Texas, USA

Partial listing

Albania

- Albanian Air Force - received two Bell 505s for training purposes in June 2026.

Angola

- BestFly Airline, delivered in 2022.

Australia

- Nautilus Aviation, received 2 in 2018.

Bahrain

- Bahrain Air Force - received three Bell 505s in February 2023.

Canada

- Delivered 2017

Ethiopia

- Delivered in 2021

Indonesia

- Indonesian Navy - received two Bell 505s in December 2021.

Iraq

- Iraqi Army Aviation Command - 15

Jamaica

- Jamaica Defence Force - ordered six Bell 505s in February 2021 for support of public safety operations and training.

Jordan

- Royal Jordanian Air Force, received Bell 505 in November 2023.

Japan

- Japan Coast Guard - received four Bell 505s in April 2018.

South Korea

- Used as trainer by South Korean Army and Navy from 2023 .

Montenegro

- Montenegrin Air Force - received first of two Bell 505s in September 2020, and second in March 2021.

Nepal

- Simrik Air, delivered in 2023.

New Zealand

- Oceania Aviation, delivered in 2018

Uganda

- BAR Aviation Uganda

Singapore

- Systematic Aviation Services

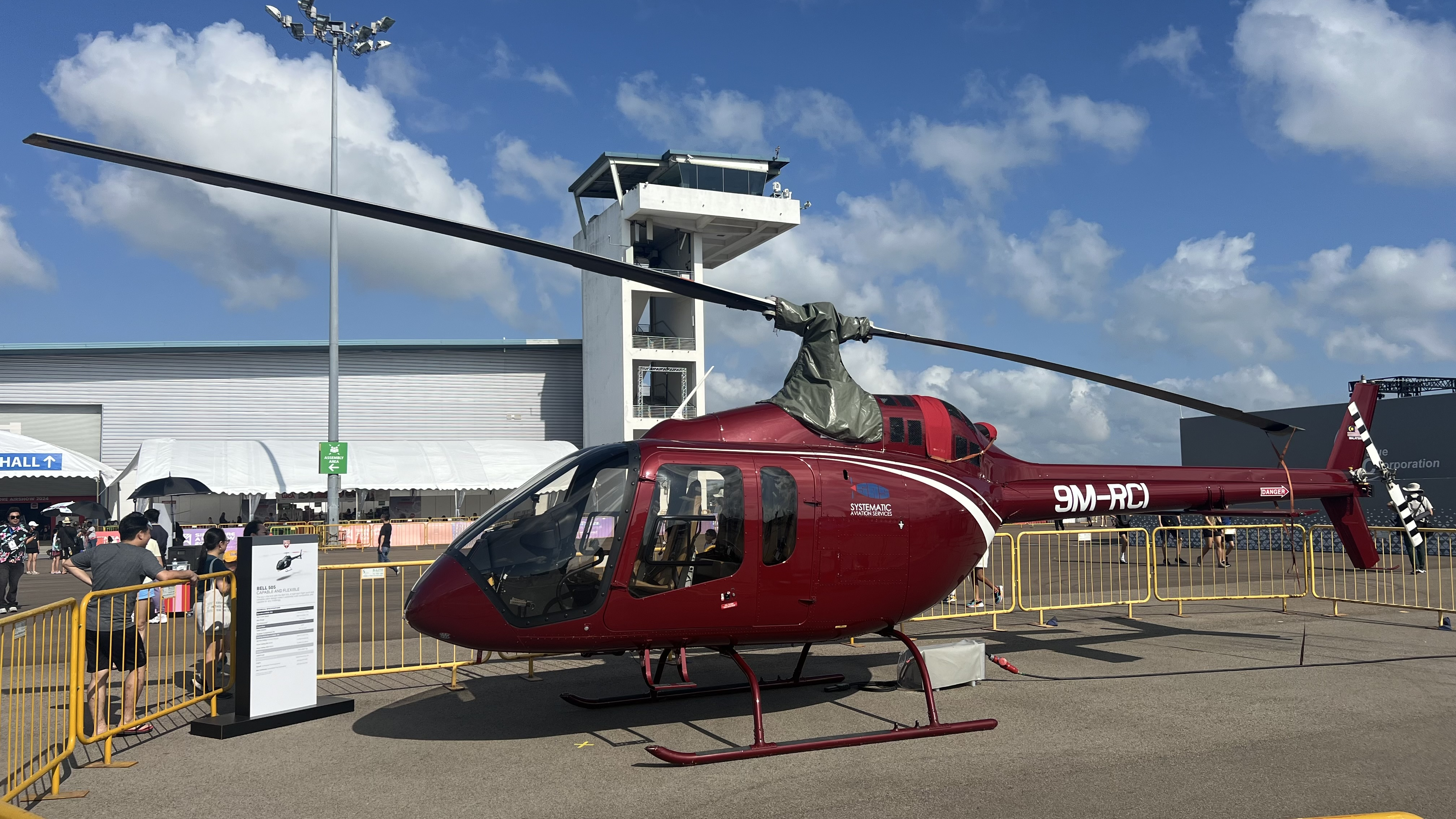
A Bell 505 in Singapore

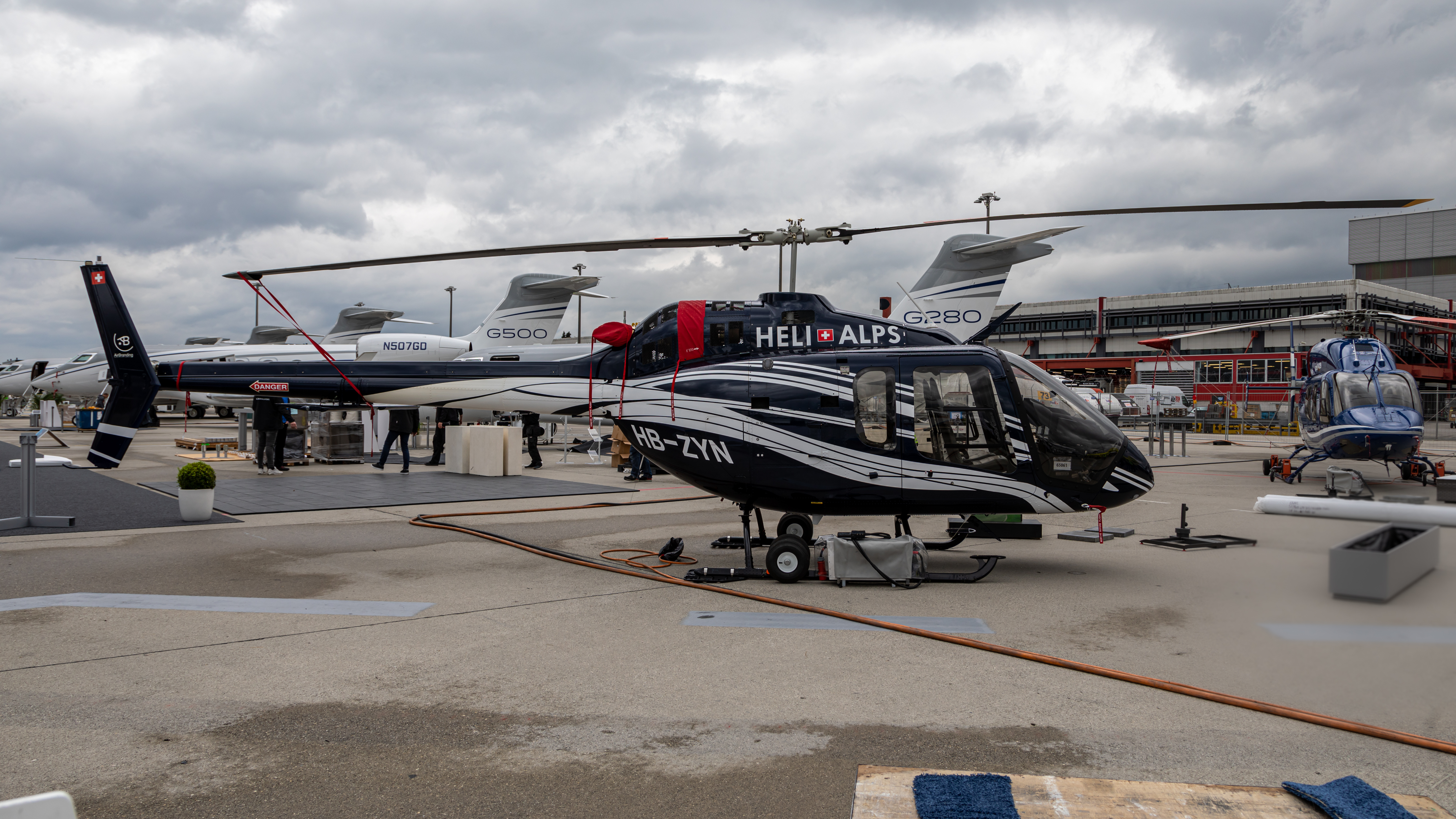
Bell 505 Jetranger X of Heli Alps at EBACE 2019, Switzerland

Switzerland

- Mountainflyers
- Heli Alps

United States

- Alameda County Sheriff's Office
- Butte County Sheriff's Office
- Fort Worth Police Department
- Sacramento Police Department
- Stockton Police Department
- Spokane County Sheriff's Department
- Los Angeles Fire Department
- Florida Fish and Wildlife conservation commission
- Nebraska State Patrol

Vietnam

- Vietnam Helicopter Corporation received two Bell 505s on May 13, 2019 remains one, one lost to crash on April 6, 2023.

=== Future operators ===
- Philippines: In May 2026, it was reported that a P9.2 billion ($150 million) sale was approved through the Foreign Military Sales program.

== Specifications ==
Data from Jet Ranger X

General characteristics

- Crew: one pilot
- Capacity: four passengers
- Length: 42 ft 5 in (12.93 m)
- Height: 10 ft 8 in (3.25 m)
- Empty weight: 2,180 lb (989 kg)
- Max takeoff weight: 3,680 lb (1,669 kg) (Internal load), 4,475 lb (2,030 kg) (external load)
- Useful load: 1,500 lb (680 kg)
- Powerplant: 1 × Safran Arrius 2R turboshaft, 505 shp (377 kW)
- Main rotor diameter: 37 ft 0 in (11.28 m)
- Main rotor area: 1,075 sq ft (99.9 m^{2})

Performance

- Maximum speed: 144 mph (232 km/h, 125 kn) (max cruise)
- Range: 383 mi (617 km, 333 nmi) at 4,000 ft (1,200 m)
- Service ceiling: 18,610 ft (5,670 m) at 3,680 lb (1,670 kg)

== See also ==
Related development

- Bell 206

Aircraft of comparable role, configuration, and era

- Eurocopter EC120 Colibri
- Robinson R66
