= Texas Alcoholic Beverage Commission =

State agency of Texas

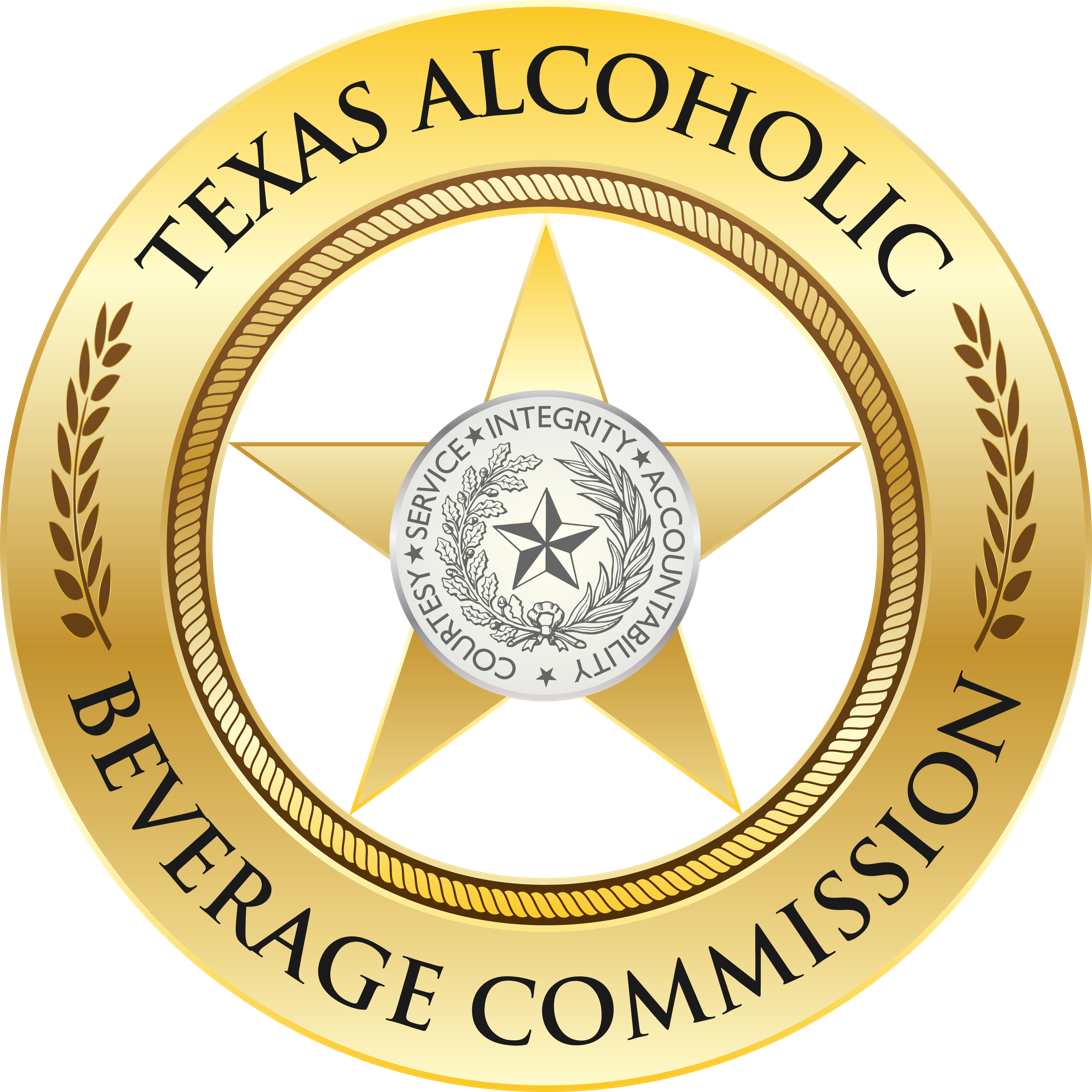

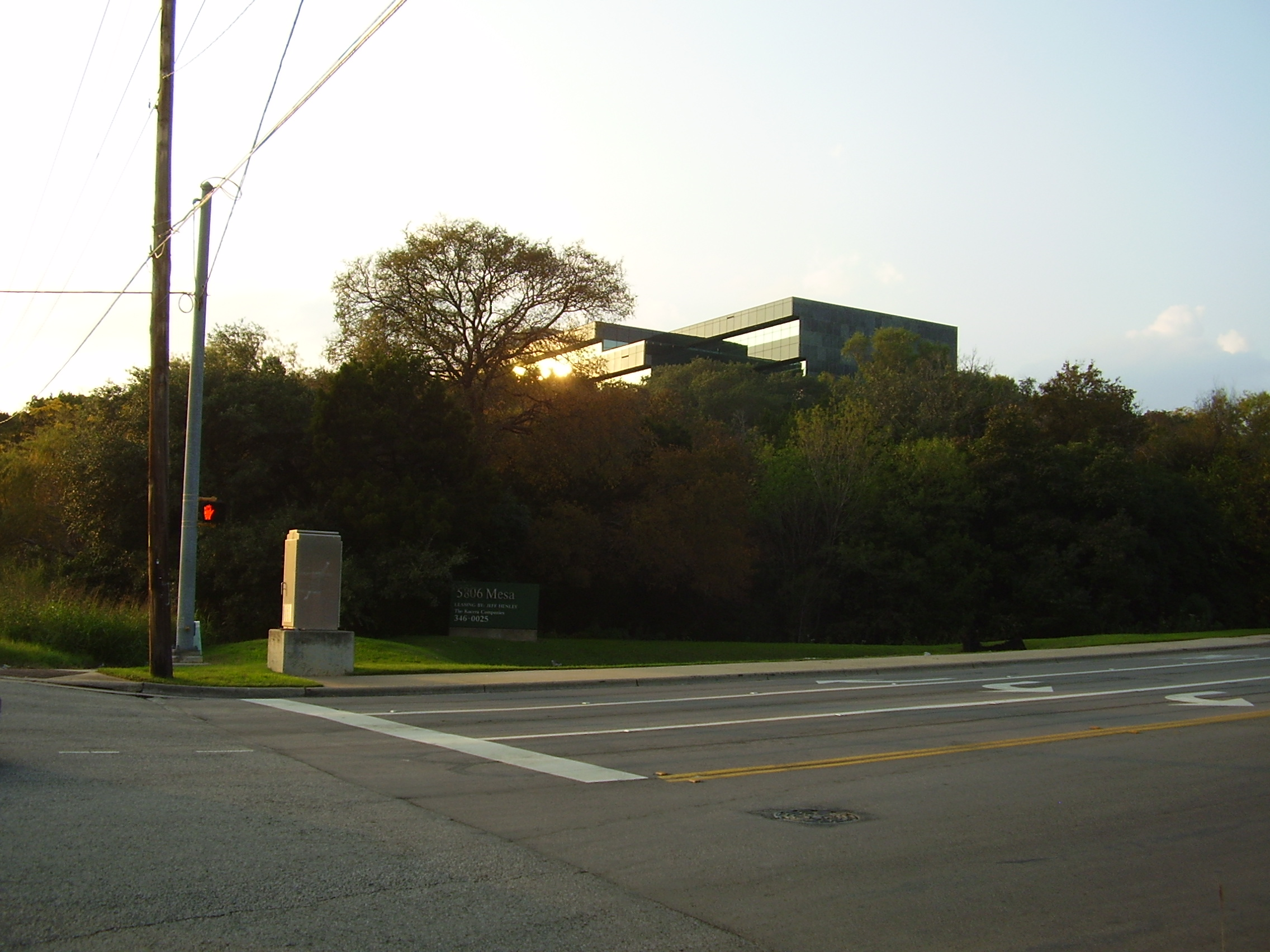
- TABC headquarters
- Abbreviation: TABC
- Formation: 1935
- Type: Public safety organization
- Purpose: Regulation and taxation of alcoholic beverages
- Headquarters: 5806 Mesa Drive #111; Austin, Texas 78731
- Region served: State of Texas
- Presiding Officer: Robert A. Eckels
- Main organ: Governing board of five appointed commissioners
- Website: www.tabc.texas.gov

The Texas Alcoholic Beverage Commission, or TABC (formerly the Texas Liquor Control Board), is a Texas regulatory and law enforcement agency. The agency is responsible for regulating, inspecting, and taxing the production, sale, and use of alcoholic beverages within the state. The agency was established in 1935 and is headquartered in Austin.

== Leadership ==
The agency is governed by a five-member commission with members appointed by the Governor of Texas for staggered six-year terms. Appointees are confirmed by the Texas Senate, though they may serve prior to confirmation if the appointment is made while the Senate is adjourned. The governor designates one member to serve as presiding officer of the Commission.

- Chair: Robert A. Eckels (appointed Sept. 30, 2025)
- Commissioner: Michael "Scott" Adkins (appointed Nov. 6, 2019)
- Commissioner: Deborah Marino (appointed Nov. 6, 2019)
- Commissioner: Hasan K. Mack (appointed March 16, 2020)
- Commissioner: Chad M. Craycraft (appointed Jan. 24, 2025)

Prior to 2019, the commission consisted of three members. Following a review of the agency by the Texas Sunset Advisory Commission in 2018, the 86th Texas Legislature voted to expand the commission from three members to five.

Day-to-day operations of the agency are overseen by an Executive Director appointed by the commission. Current Executive Director Thomas W. Graham was appointed July 26, 2022.

== Responsibilities and powers ==
The TABC's organic law, the Texas Alcoholic Beverage Code, authorizes the agency to:

- Grant, refuse, suspend, or cancel permits and licenses in all phases of the alcoholic beverage industry
- Supervise, inspect, and regulate the manufacturing, importation, exportation, transportation, sale, storage, distribution, and possession of alcoholic beverages
- Assess and collect fees and taxes
- Investigate for violations of the Alcoholic Beverage Code and assist in the prosecution of violators
- Seize illicit beverages
- Adopt standards of quality and approve labels and size of containers for all alcoholic beverages sold in Texas
- Pass rules to assist the agency in all of the above, etc.

TABC agents are fully empowered state police officers with statewide criminal jurisdiction and may make arrests for any offense.

== History ==
=== Overview ===
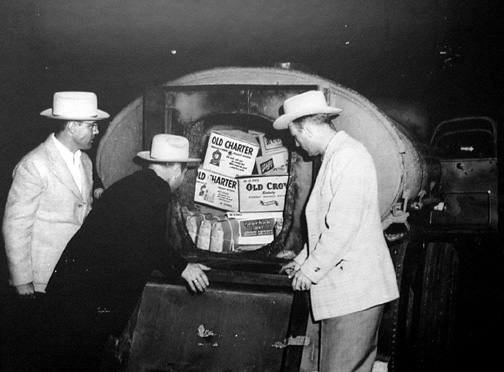
Inspectors from the Texas Liquor Control Board seize a stash of illicit liquor hidden in a tanker truck during an operation near Brownfield, Texas, in 1959.

In 1933 the 21st Amendment to the U.S. Constitution ended Prohibition and devolved responsibility for the regulation of alcoholic beverages to the states. Shortly thereafter, the Texas Legislature passed the Texas Liquor Control Act to govern alcohol in Texas, and on Nov. 18, 1935 the Texas Liquor Control Board was established to administer the Act. The agency's name was changed to the Alcoholic Beverage Commission on 1 January 1970, and the Liquor Control Act was superseded by the Texas Alcoholic Beverage Code on Sept. 1, 1977.

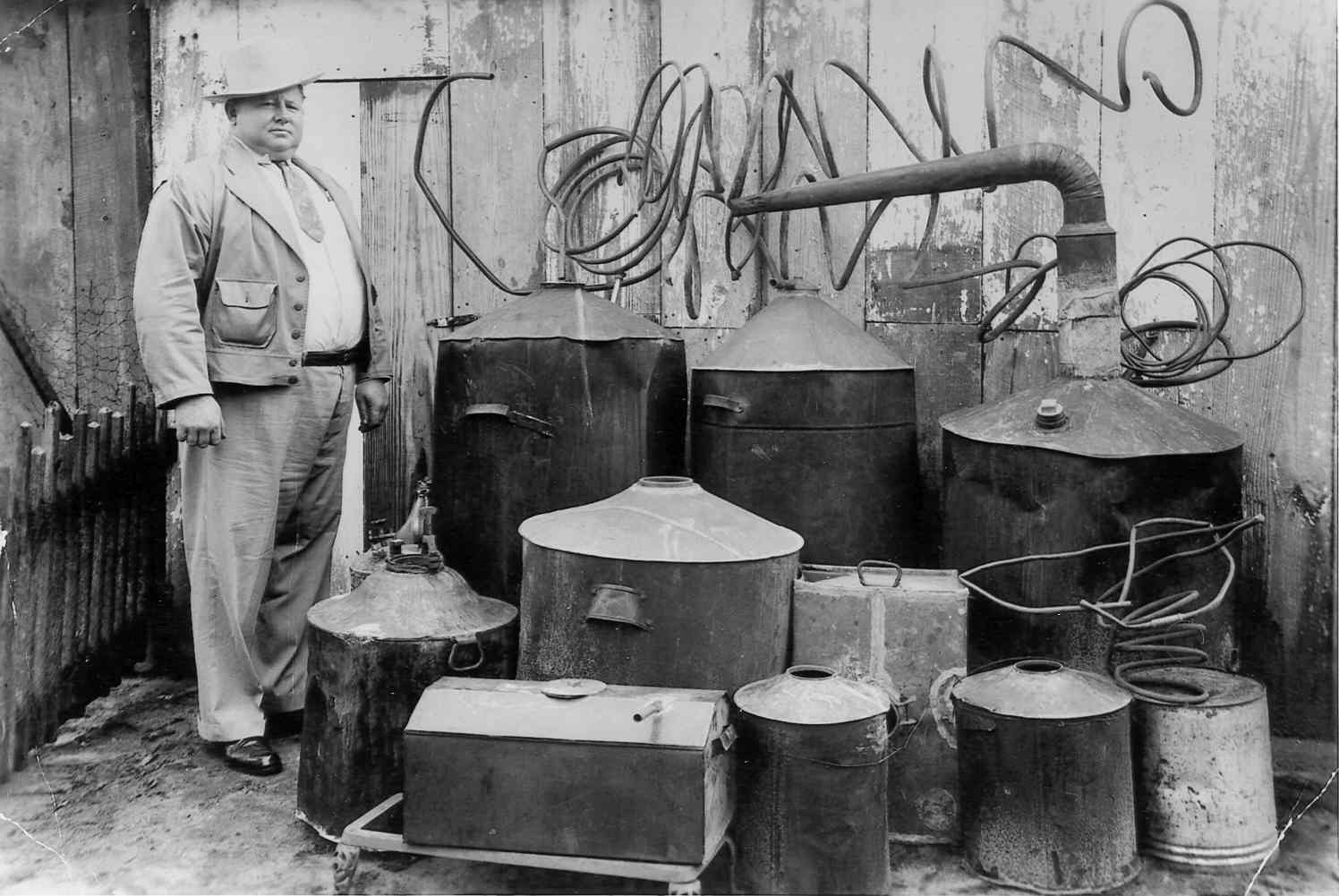
Texas Liquor Control Board Agent Red Zwernemann stands with an illegal still he seized during operations in the 1940s.

The scope of the agency's mission increased further in 1971 with the passage of "liquor by the drink" legislation in the Texas Legislature. The new law came in response to a public referendum and created a new type of state-issued permit allowing the sales of distilled spirits and mixed drinks in areas specifically authorized by local elections. The law also provided for the creation of a Mixed Beverage Gross Receipts tax, which quickly became a major revenue generator for the state. During fiscal year 1993, the tax and associated fees generated more than $244.7 million, accounting for more than half the total revenue collected by the agency.

Today, TABC regulates more than 54,000 licensed businesses in Texas as well as more than 100,000 out-of-state producers and distributors of alcoholic beverages. The agency collects more than $220 million per year in state excise and import taxes, as well as a further $76 million in licensing fees, surcharges, and administrative fines.

=== Rainbow Lounge incident ===
On June 28, 2009, officers from the Fort Worth Police Department and TABC conducted a raid on the Rainbow Lounge, a gay bar in Fort Worth. The incident occurred on the anniversary of the Stonewall Riots, a 1969 New York riot seen as the start of the LGBT rights movement. Many Rainbow Lounge patrons were present to mark the anniversary. Several customers were arrested for intoxication inside of the bar. One patron was hospitalized due to alcohol poisoning as well as injuries he sustained while in TABC custody. Following the incident, an internal investigation found that three TABC agents who took part in the raid had violated multiple agency policies, leading to their termination. A later Use of Force report found that allegations of improper use of force against two of the agents were unfounded, though the agents' terminations were upheld. According to then-TABC Administrator Alan Steen, "...this is not how we treat people, and we have been looking at this from every angle to find ways to make sure it does not happen again."

=== Travel Spending & New Leadership ===
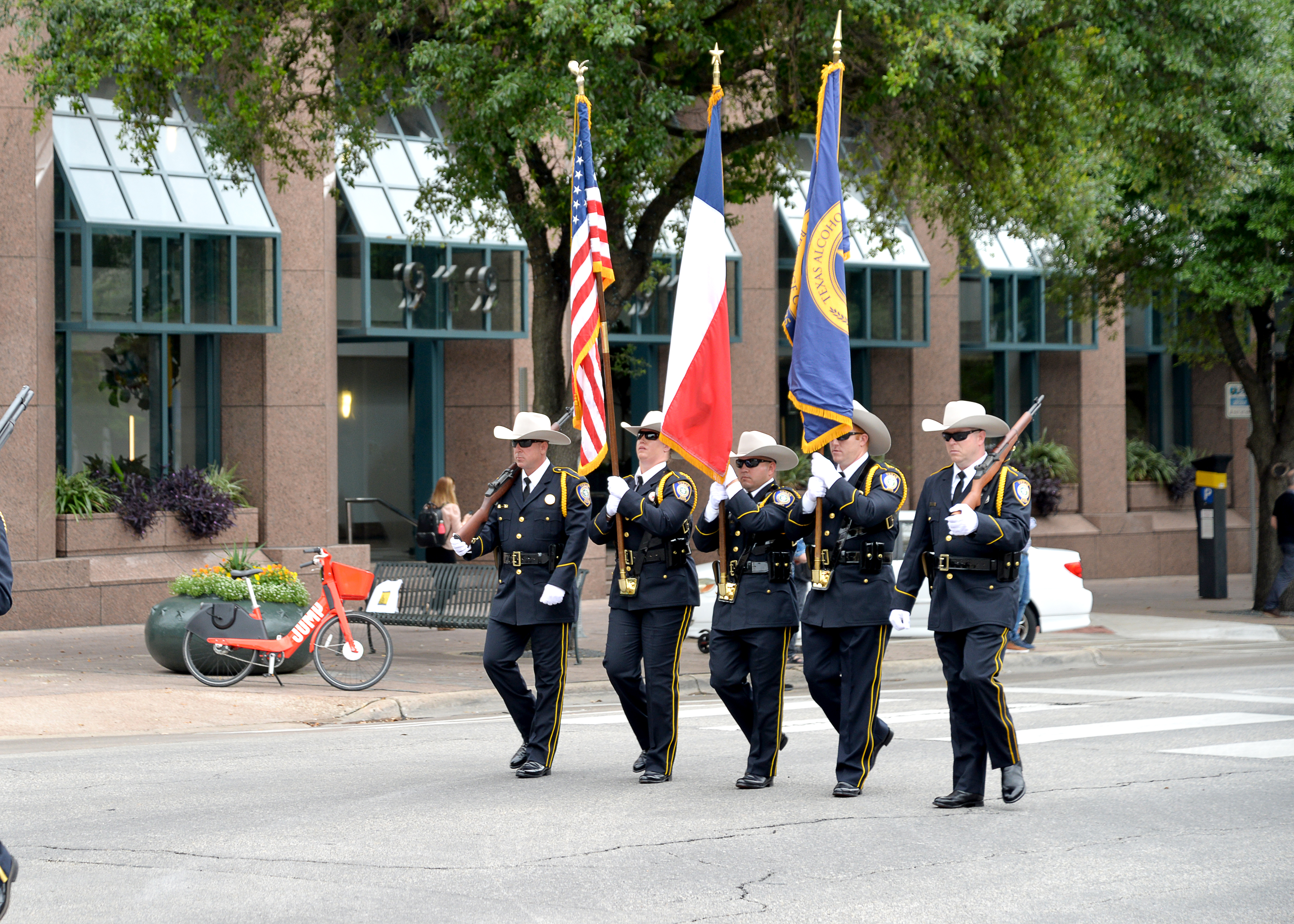
The TABC honor guard participates in a peace officers memorial service near the Texas Capitol in Austin.

On April 17, 2017, TABC Executive Director Sherry Cook announced she was retiring from her position. The decision came a month after the Texas Tribune reported that agency leadership had spent $85,000 during a six-year period from 2011 to 2017 on out-of-state travel, including on trips to meetings hosted by the National Conference of State Liquor Administrators, a group representing state liquor regulators and alcoholic beverage industry members from across the United States.

Prior to her retirement, Cook had been questioned about the spending during a Texas House General Investigating and Ethics Committee hearing chaired by Texas Rep. Sarah Davis, R-West University Place. The hearing also covered fraudulent allegations by a former TABC employee claiming the agency held several missing vehicles in its inventory; these claims were later debunked during a review by the Texas State Auditor's Office. Cook's activities and travel payments as chair of the National Conference of State Liquor Administrators were also investigated by the Texas Ethics Commission, which ultimately found no wrongdoing.

Immediately following Cook's retirement announcement, Texas Gov. Greg Abbott announced his selection of Houston businessman Kevin J. Lilly as the Commission's new presiding officer. Lilly's first priorities included hiring a new executive director to succeed Cook, naming former United States Army brigadier general Bentley Nettles on July 12, 2017.

Under new leadership, the agency worked to rehabilitate its image, reaching out to law enforcement agencies and industry members to collaborate on new programs designed to enhance public safety while enabling business owners to more easily comply with the state's complex alcohol laws. These efforts drew praise from the alcoholic beverage industry, noting that "the transformation that has taken place already under General Nettles' leadership is hard to overstate." The initiatives also resulted in a reduction in major litigation against the agency; one suit filed by the McLane Company, which claimed that Texas laws prohibiting vertical integration of the liquor industry was unconstitutional, was dropped.

=== 2018 Sunset Review ===
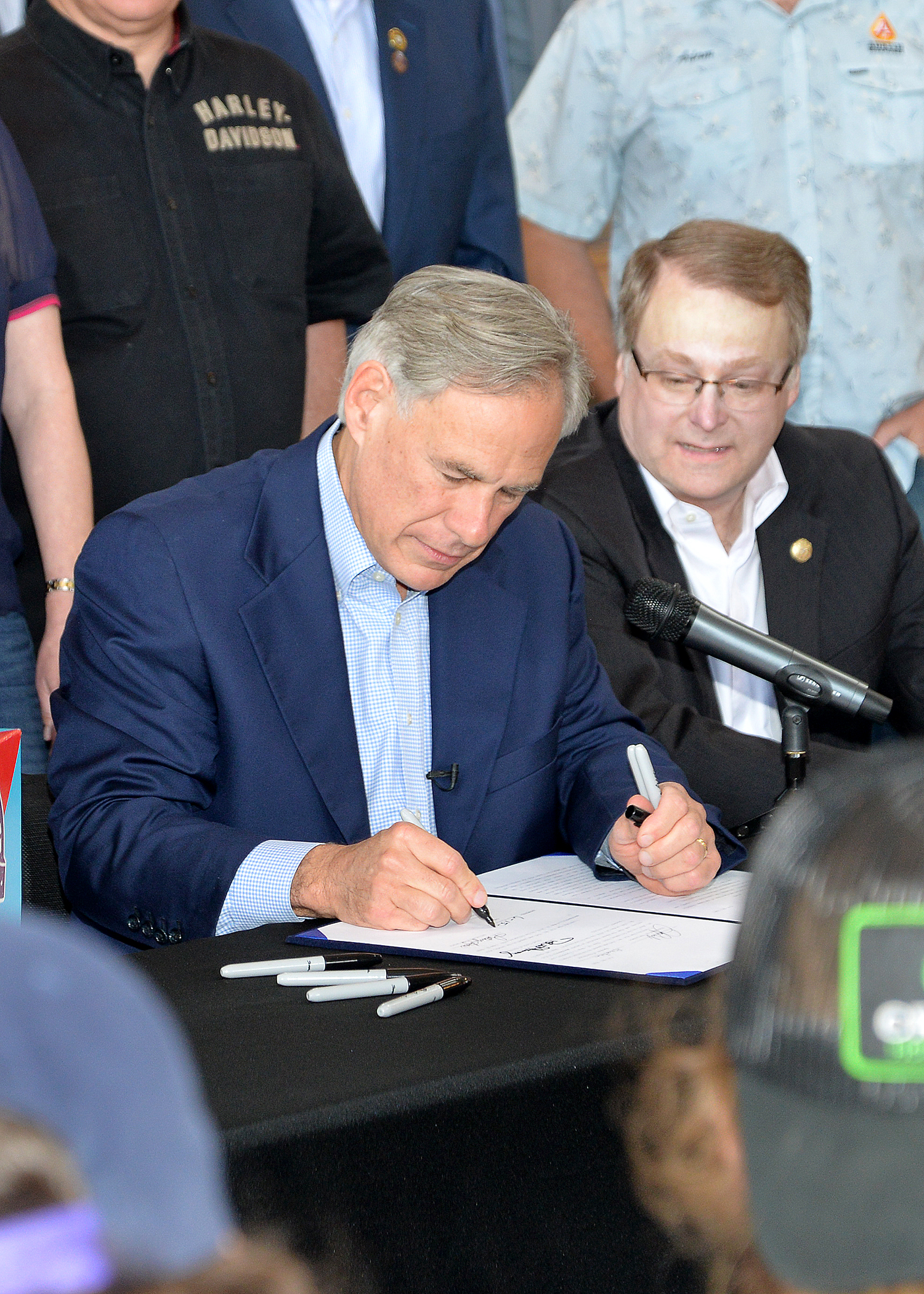
Texas Gov. Greg Abbott signs the TABC Sunset bill during a ceremony on June 15, 2019 as state Sen. Brian Birdwell looks on.

In 2018, TABC was reviewed by the Texas Sunset Advisory Commission, a legislative board which determines whether a state agency's function is still required and seeks ways to improve efficiencies and performance. Following the eight-month review process, the commission made numerous recommendations:

- Continuing the agency for 12 years;
- Increasing the size of the Commission board from three members to five;
- Eliminating or combining unnecessary or redundant license/permits, reducing the number of license/permit types from 75 to 36;
- Combining the beer and ale beverage designations into a single "malt beverage" designation and setting the same tax rates and regulations for those beverages; and
- Eliminating the state review of malt beverage labels while allowing TABC to accept federal Certificate of Label Approval (COLA).

Two major amendments were added to the TABC Sunset bill during debate in the Texas House of Representatives and Texas Senate. One amendment allows brewery permit holders to sell malt beverages to-go to consumers at their on-site taprooms or tasting rooms; the other removes the five-permit limit for Package Store permits and the consanguinity provision which allowed family members to combine their permits in order to legally exceed the five-permit limit.

The final version of the bill was passed unanimously by the Texas Senate and the Texas House; Governor Greg Abbott signed the bill into law during a June 15, 2019 ceremony at the Austin Beerworks brewery.

Following the recommendations of the 2018 sunset review, TABC implemented the Alcohol Industry Management System (AIMS) in September 2021. The online-only system allowed TABC to modernize operations, cut costs and improve customer service, while providing users a means to more quickly and easily submit and track applications, letters and other documents.

== Human trafficking ==
A primary goal of the agency is "complete eradication of human trafficking at TABC-licensed businesses." TABC conducts regular inspections of all Texas businesses which hold a state-issued license to manufacture, distribute, or sell alcohol, and agency inspectors are trained to recognize the warning signs of human trafficking at these locations. A Houston-area operation in 2004 resulted in the rescue of more than 100 human trafficking victims, and recent efforts include partnerships with local, state, and federal task forces as well as Texas First Lady Cecilia Abbott. The agency has also partnered with members of the alcoholic beverage industry to provide training on the most common human trafficking warning signs to industry employees, and a free agency-published mobile application allows users to report suspected trafficking directly to TABC using their smartphone. The agency has also launched a public awareness campaign to inform members of the public on ways to report suspected trafficking, as well as ways to recognize warning signs.

A 2019 joint operation between the agency and the Bexar County Sheriff's Office resulted in the arrest of a suspected human trafficker as well as the closure of a San Antonio-area strip club which allowed trafficked minors to work as exotic dancers. A second 2019 case in Hidalgo County, Texas involved the owner of a bar and her son who were arrested on human trafficking and sexual assault charges following a year-long joint investigation involving TABC, county officials, and the FBI.

== Fallen officers ==
Since the establishment of the Texas Alcoholic Beverage Commission, two officers have died while on duty.

== TABC Bartender Certification ==
The TABC bartender certification is a standardized training program recognized throughout Texas. It educates servers on responsible alcohol service, including how to verify identification, spot signs of intoxication, and prevent sales to minors, thereby promoting safer establishments and communities statewide.
