= Fort Worth Police Department =

- Fort Worth Police Shoulder Patch

- Fort Worth Police Badge
- Abbreviation: FWPD

Agency overview
- Formed: April 12, 1873; 153 years ago
- Employees: 2,132 (2020)
- Annual budget: $437 million (2025)

Jurisdictional structure
- Operations jurisdiction: Fort Worth, Texas, USA
- Jurisdiction of Fort Worth Police Department
- Area: 334 sq mi
- Population: 958,692 (2022)
- General nature: Local civilian police

Operational structure
- Headquarters: 505 W. Felix St.
- Police Officers: 1,986 Police Officers (2026)
- Civilian Members: 438 Civilian Members (2020)
- Agency executive: Eddie Garcia, Chief of Police
- Child agency: Fort Worth Police Explorers

Facilities
- Police Stations: 11
- Jail Services: LaSalle Corrections (Contract) Tarrant County Corrections Center

Website
- Fort Worth Police

The Fort Worth Police Department (FWPD) is the police department of Fort Worth, Texas, United States. Eddie Garcia is the Chief of Police.

FWPD is responsible for traffic and general law enforcement within the city limits of Fort Worth. Specialty divisions include investigation, K-9, bicycle patrol, crisis intervention teams, school resource officers, tactical medic unit, and SWAT.

== History ==
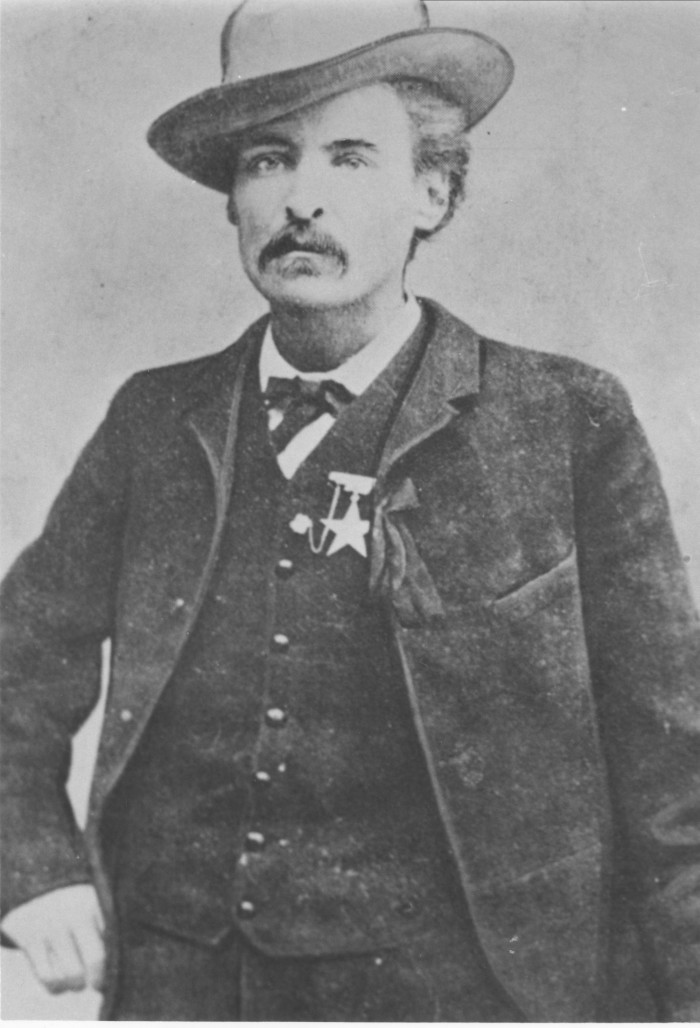
Fort Worth Town marshall Jim Courtright

The Fort Worth Police Department started on April 12, 1873 when E.M. Terrell was appointed City Marshal with a force of four officers. However, the force was disbanded a month later for economic reasons. The force was re-established in 1876 to cope with unruly cowboys and high levels of prostitution, with Jim Courtright being instated as City Marshal with two assisting deputies. Courtright's reputation as an Army scout and gunfighter led to an unprecedented term of nonviolence in Fort Worth. By 1887, the force had grown to six officers and a Chief of Police.

The early 20th century saw many innovations to the FWPD, including motorcycles, traffic tickets, stoplights, and the city's first female officer. The mid-1900s saw even more technological advances, with the addition of a crime laboratory and radar speed detectors. Throughout the 1990s and early 2000s, the department sought to establish better links to the community, instituting programs such as "forums," a series of monthly department-citizen meetings, and the Citizens on Patrol program.

In 2008, after the retirement of Chief Ralph Mendoza, Executive Deputy Patricia Kneblick was briefly appointed interim chief, making her the first woman ever to be appointed Chief of Police in Fort Worth. Jeffrey Halstead, a Commander with the Phoenix Police Department, replaced Kneblick in December 2008, making him the city's 24th chief.

In 2015, Joel Fitzgerald became the 1st African-American police chief of the city. Fitzgerald holds a Ph.D in Business Administration from Northcentral University; an MBA from Eastern University; and an undergraduate degree from Villanova University. He has since become the Waterloo Police Department Chief of Police. Interim Chief Ed Kraus was named until a replacement is selected by city officials. He was later selected to permanently fill the position. Chief Neil Noakes was subsequently selected as Chief in January 2021 and served until June 2025.

On September 16, 2025, Eddie Garcia was sworn in as the 28th Chief of Police of the Fort Worth Police Department. The department currently has 1986 sworn officers.

=== Uniforms ===
The department's uniforms and badges have changed multiple times before the present standards. Early uniforms were all produced in various shades of blue, with garments ranging from coats with brass buttons to cloaks. Headwear was particularly diverse - depending on the uniform, officers in the early 1900s wore custodian helmets, ten-gallon cowboy hats, or slouched hats resembling those of Civil War cavalrymen.

The department has worn five different badges throughout its history; the current design, which features a shield topped by a panther, was first worn in 1912. The current patch design, which features a star and longhorn head, was adopted in 1977.

The current uniform consists of a navy blue shirt and pants with black tactical boots. The badge is worn on the left chest, and patches are worn on either shoulder. Ceremonial dress is similar to the duty uniform, with the addition of a white fourragère, cotton gloves, white duty belt and pouches, and a navy blue peaked cap. Officers often wear black felt (winter) or straw (summer) cowboy hats as part of the uniform (as do many other police agencies in Texas).

== Organization ==
Under the Chief of police Eddie Garcia, the Fort Worth Police department is broken down into three bureaus (Patrol, Special Operations, and Finance/Personnel)

Assistant Chief Stefanie Ricks is over the Patrol Bureau. Patrol Bureau is further broken down into two Commands (North and South)

- Deputy Chief Sean Kenjura is over the North Command
- Deputy Chief Andre Smith is over the South Command

Assistant Chief Christopher Daniels is over the Special Operations Bureau, which is further broken down into two Commands (Tactical and Investigative/Support)

- Deputy Chief Amelia Heise is over the Investigative and Support Command
- Deputy Chief Mark Barthen is over the Tactical Command

Assistant Chief David Carabajal is over the Finance/Personnel Bureau.

- Deputy Chief Buck Wheeler is over the Community Alliance Command
- Deputy Chief Monica Martin is over Operational Command

The Fort Worth Police Department is divided into six Patrol Divisions: Central, North, South, East, Northwest and West, each encompassing various areas of the city. Divisions are further divided into four Neighborhood Policing Districts each.

The general areas of the city included in each Patrol Division are:

Central Division - Commander Robert Stewart

- Downtown
- Hospital District
- Texas Christian University

North Division - Commander Christopher Gorrie

- Fort Worth Stockyards
- Texas Motor Speedway
- North Fort Worth

Northwest Division - Commander Randy Molina

East Division - Commander Mathew Medders

- East Fort Worth

West Division - Commander Jason Spencer

- Lake Worth
- Camp Bowie
- Museum District
- Fort Worth Zoo
- Texas Christian University

South Division - Commander Chauncy Pogue

- South Fort Worth

== Vehicles ==
The Fort Worth Police Department uses primarily sedans as patrol vehicles. All marked patrol units are painted in a traditional black-and-white color scheme. Older vehicles exhibit the word "Police" on the front quarter panel and the rear doors, with the words "Fort Worth" printed in black over an orange-tan longhorn head (the city's logo) on the front doors; newer vehicles place the word "Police" below the longhorn on the front door, and across the hood of the car in white.

The Fort Worth Police Department's primary replacement to the Ford Crown Victoria was the Ford Police Interceptor sedan. The Ford Police Interceptor sedan was later replaced by the Interceptor Utility. A fleet transition is currently underway moving to the primary use of the Chevrolet Tahoe PPV SUV. Dodge Chargers were used alongside Tahoe’s for a short time, yet some fleet issues encouraged the current transition to the sole use of Chevrolet Tahoe PPV’s for everyday patrol use. The department's Traffic Division mainly utilizes police issue BMW motorcycles and Dodge Chargers to complete its freeway enforcement duties.

Patrol Vehicles

- Ford Crown Victoria Police Interceptor
- Dodge Charger
- Chevrolet Impala
- Ford Taurus (Police Interceptor)
- Ford Explorer (Police Interceptor Utility)
- Chevrolet Tahoe PPV

Trucks

- Ford F-250

Aircraft

- Bell 206B Helicopter
- Bell 505 Helicopter

Tactical

- LENCO BearCat

== Sidearms ==
In 2010, officers began using either the Glock 17 or 22, in 9x19 Parabellum and .40 S&W, respectively. This was done to reduce costs from the SIG Sauer P226.

== Rank structure and insignia ==
Rank	Insignia
Chief of Police	
Assistant Chief	
Deputy Chief	
Commander	
Captain	
Lieutenant	
Sergeant	
Corporal/Detective	
Police Officer	N/A

== Line-of-duty deaths ==
Since the establishment of the Fort Worth Police Department, 58 officers have died in the line of duty.

The causes of death are as follows:

Cause of death	Number of deaths
Assault	2
Automobile accident	3
Drowned	1
Duty related illness	3
Gunfire	26
Gunfire (Accidental)	2
Heart attack	2
Motorcycle accident	7
Stabbed	1
Struck by streetcar	1
Struck by vehicle	2
Vehicle pursuit	2
Vehicular assault	6

Fallen officers are recognized publicly at the Fort Worth Police and Firefighters' Memorial on 7th Street.

== Demographics ==
- Male: 83 percent
- Female: 17 percent
- White: 75 percent
- Hispanic: 13 percent
- African-American/Black: 12 percent

== See also ==
- List of law enforcement agencies in Texas
- Tarrant County Sheriff's Office
