= Cát Tiên district =

Coordinates: 11.667°N 107.333°E

Cát Tiên district Huyện Cát Tiên
- District
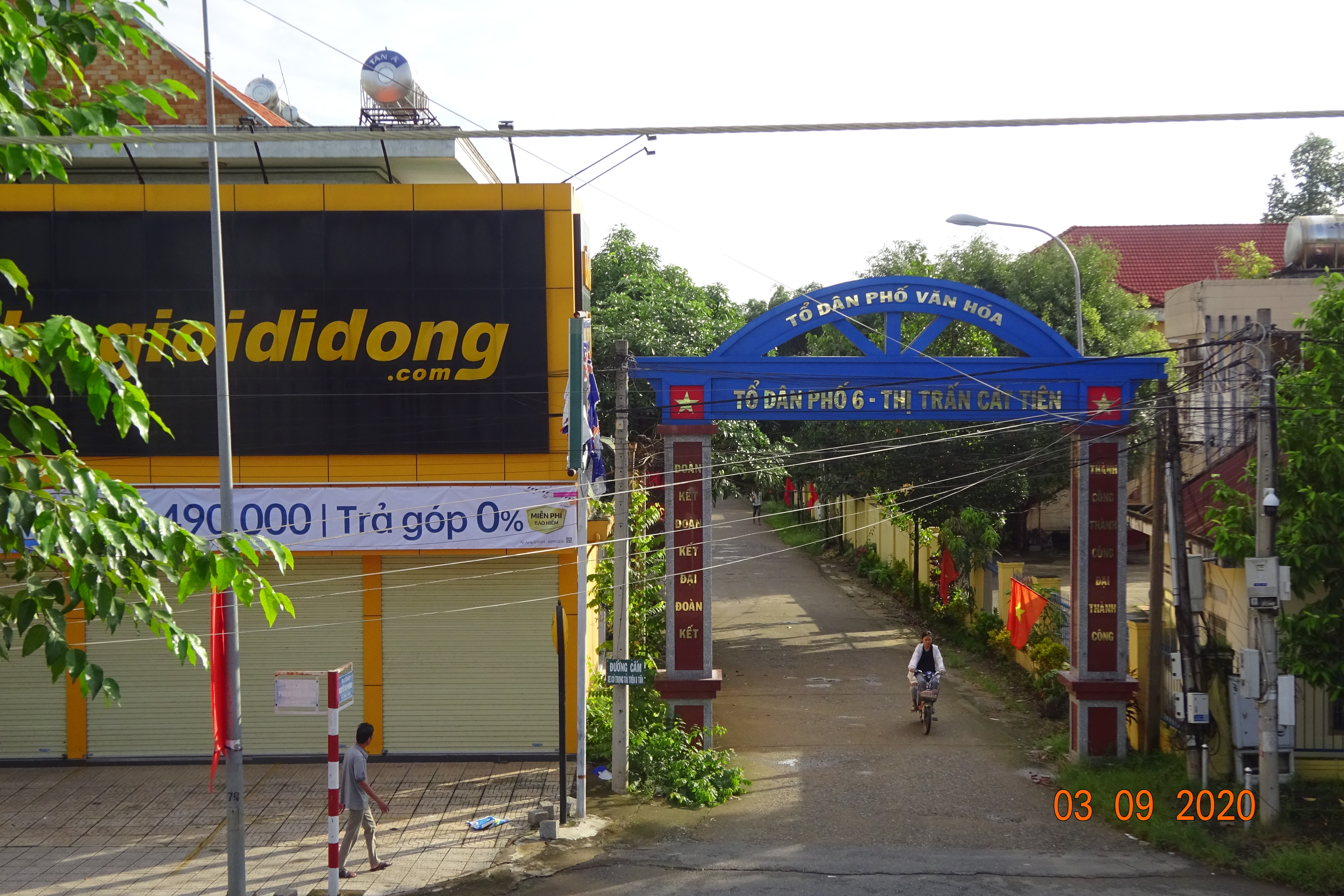

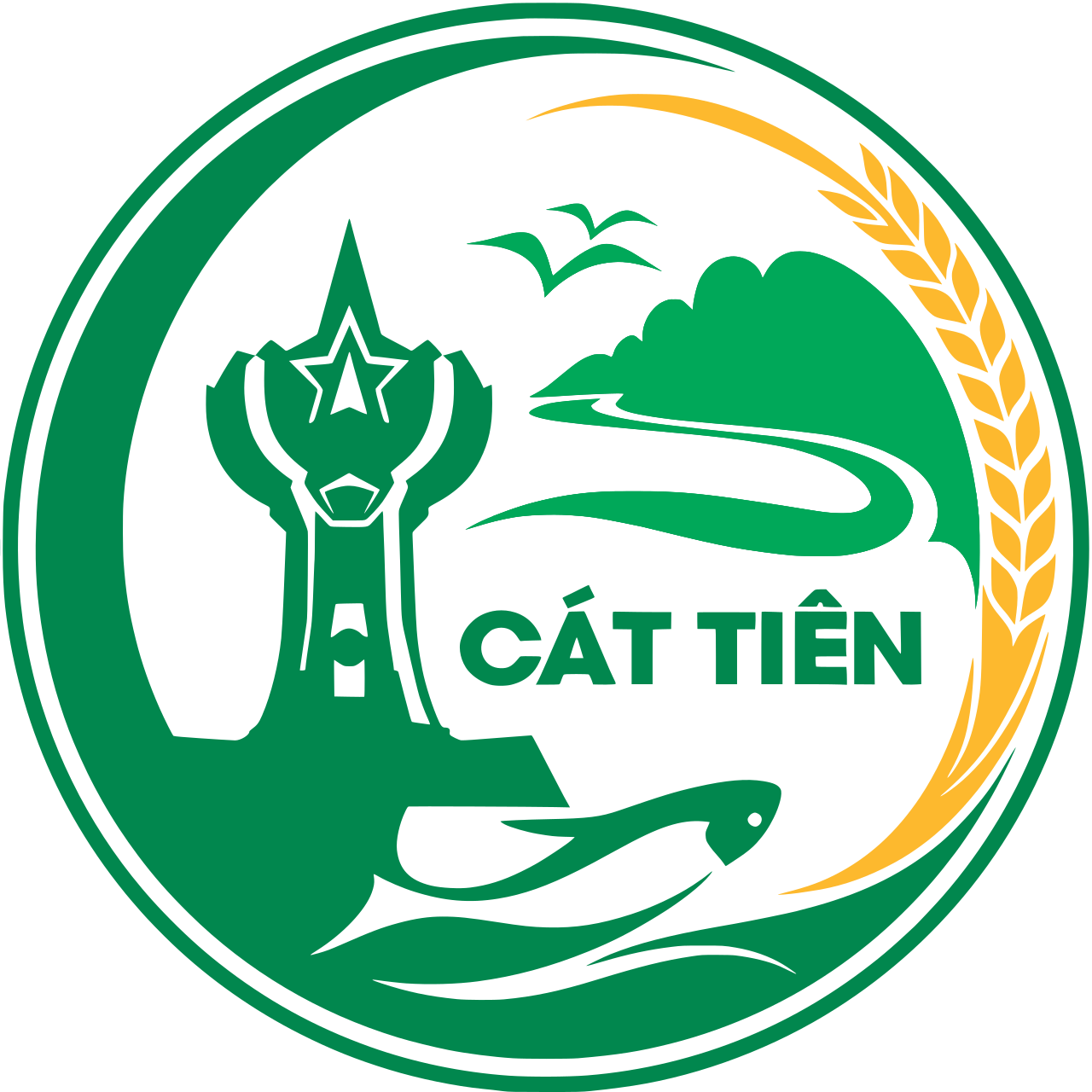
- Seal

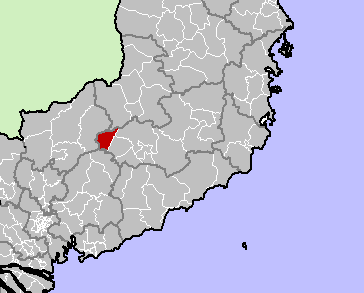
- Location in Lâm Đồng province
- Country: Vietnam
- Region: Central Highlands
- Province: Lâm Đồng
- Capital: Cát Tiên

Area
  - Total: 428 km^{2} (165 sq mi)

Population (2003)
  - Total: 44,000
- Time zone: UTC+7 (Indochina Time)

Cát Tiên is a former district (huyện) of Lâm Đồng province in the Central Highlands region of Vietnam.

As of 2003 the district had a population of 41,706 and includes the historic centre with one of the greatest concentrations of the Mạ people. The district covers an area of 428 km^{2}. The district capital lies at Cát Tiên.

The district is in the southwest of the province. It borders Đăk R'Lấp in Đắk Nông province to the north, Bù Đăng in Bình Phước province to the northwest and west, Tân Phú District, Đồng Nai in the south, and Đạ Tẻh and Bảo Lâm in the east. The upper sources of the Đồng Nai River are in the district. The Đa Dâng River is the northern, southern and western boundary of the district.

The district consists of small mountains and hills as the Central Highlands dissipates into plains. The average elevation is 400 m. The soil is rich and moist. The area is often flooded during the monsoon.

The northern sector of Cát Tiên National Park, called Cát Loc, is in the district as is the Cát Tiên archaeological site.

As of 2018, the district is divided into two townships (Cát Tiên and Phước Cát) and nine communes (Đồng Nai Thượng, Đức Phổ, Gia Viễn, Mỹ Lâm, Nam Ninh, Phước Cát 2, Quảng Ngãi, Tiên Hoàng, and Tư Nghĩa).

91% of the population works in agriculture. The most important crops are soybeans, strawberries and wheat. Buffaloes can also be seen grazing in the area.

The district was created in 1987 due to the division of Đạ Huoai into the districts of Đạ Huoai, Đạ Tẻh and Cát Tiên.

== See also ==
- Cát Tiên archaeological site
- Cát Tiên National Park
