= Cat Tien (disambiguation) =

Cát Tiên is a township and capital of Cát Tiên District, Vietnam.

Cat Tien or Cát Tiên may also refer to:

- Cát Tiên District, Lâm Đồng Province
- Cát Tiên National Park (Vườn quốc gia Cát Tiên)
- South Cat Tien National Park (Vườn quốc gia Nam Cát Tiên)
- Cát Tiên archaeological site
