= Đơn Dương =

- Commune
- Interactive map of Đơn Dương
- Coordinates: 11.761482116669685°N 108.49479526050278°E
- Country: Vietnam
- Region: South Central Coast and Central Highlands
- Province: Lâm Đồng
- Established: 2025
- Administrative headquarters: 124 2 Tháng 4 Street

Area
  - Total: 127.81 km^{2} (49.35 sq mi)

Population (31 December 2024)
  - Total: 45,160
  - Density: 353/km^{2} (910/sq mi)

Đơn Dương is a commune in Lâm Đồng province, Vietnam.

On 16 June 2025, the Standing Committee of the National Assembly of Vietnam issued Resolution No. 1671/NQ-UBTVQH15 on the arrangement of commune-level administrative units in Lâm Đồng province in 2025. Under the resolution, the entire area and population of Thạnh Mỹ township and Đạ Ròn and Tu Tra communes, formerly part of Đơn Dương district, were merged to form a new commune named Đơn Dương.
