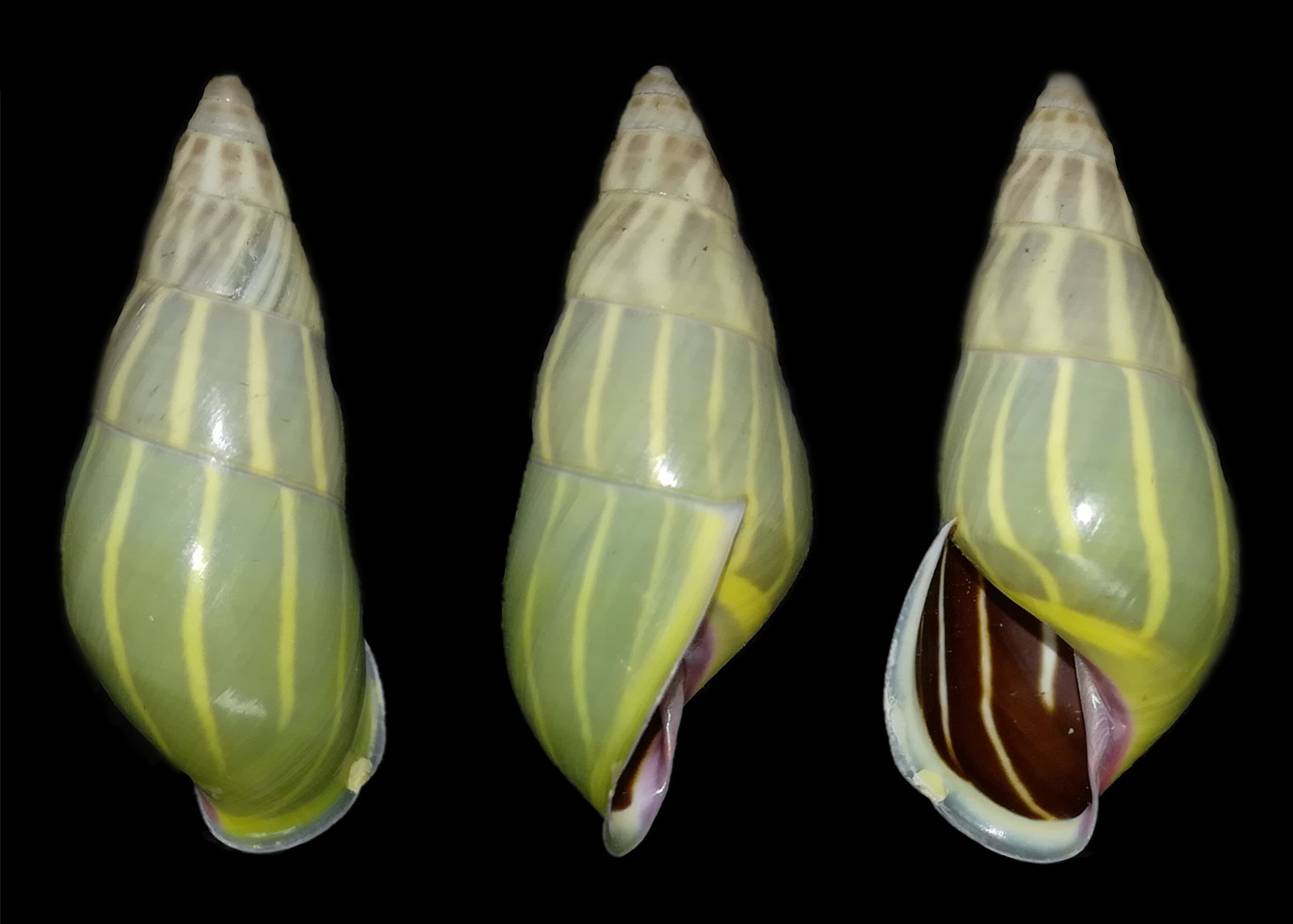

Scientific classification
- Kingdom: Animalia
- Phylum: Mollusca
- Class: Gastropoda
- Order: Stylommatophora
- Family: Camaenidae
- Genus: Amphidromus
- Species: A. baolocensis

Binomial name
- Amphidromus baolocensis Thach & F. Huber, 2016

Synonyms
- Amphidromus dambriensis Thach & F. Huber, 2016 (junior synonym); Amphidromus ngocanhi Thach, 2017 (junior synonym)

= Amphidromus baolocensis =

Species of gastropod

Amphidromus baolocensis is a species of slender air-breathing tree snail, an arboreal gastropod mollusk in the family Camaenidae.

== Habitat ==
It is found on the ground, among leaf litter.

== Distribution ==
Its distribution includes Lâm Đồng Province, Central Vietnam.

== Etymology ==
This species is named for Bảo Lộc City of Vietnam.
