= Đạ Huoai =

- Commune
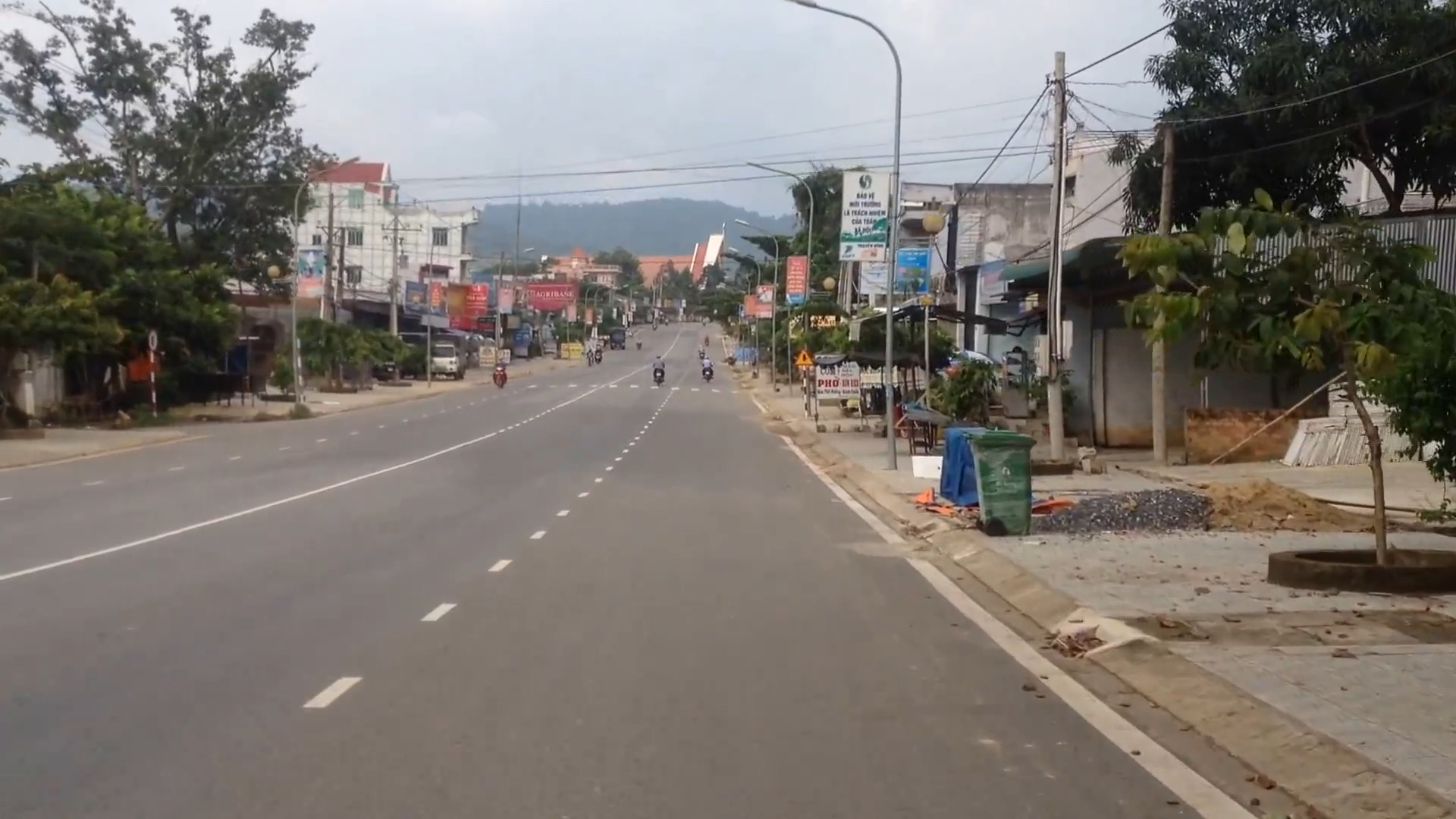
- A section of National Route 20 through Đạ Huoai commune
- Interactive map of Đạ Huoai
- Coordinates: 11.386775017146343°N 107.53456807907804°E
- Country: Vietnam
- Region: South Central Coast and Central Highlands
- Province: Lâm Đồng
- Administrative headquarters: Trần Hưng Đạo Street, Hamlet 3

Area
  - Total: 113.96 km^{2} (44.00 sq mi)

Population (31 December 2024)
  - Total: 23,117
  - Density: 202/km^{2} (520/sq mi)
- Website: dahuoai.lamdong.gov.vn

Đạ Huoai is a commune in Lâm Đồng province, Vietnam.

On 16 June 2025, the Standing Committee of the National Assembly of Vietnam issued Resolution No. 1671/NQ-UBTVQH15 on the arrangement of commune-level administrative units in Lâm Đồng province in 2025, which took effect on the same date. Under the resolution, the entire area and population of Mađaguôi township and the communes of Mađaguôi and Đạ Oai, formerly part of Đạ Huoai district, were merged to form a new commune named Đạ Huoai (Clause 33, Article 1).
