= Quercus xanthotricha =

Conservation status
- Endangered (IUCN 3.1)

Scientific classification
- Kingdom: Plantae
- Clade: Embryophytes
- Clade: Tracheophytes
- Clade: Spermatophytes
- Clade: Angiosperms
- Clade: Eudicots
- Clade: Rosids
- Order: Fagales
- Family: Fagaceae
- Genus: Quercus
- Subgenus: Quercus subg. Cerris
- Section: Quercus sect. Cyclobalanopsis
- Species: Q. xanthotricha

Binomial name
- Quercus xanthotricha A.Camus

Synonyms
- Cyclobalanopsis fuhsingensis (Y.T.Chang) Y.T.Chang ex Y.C.Hsu & H.W.Jen; Cyclobalanopsis xanthotricha (A.Camus) Y.C.Hsu & H.Wei Jen; Quercus djiringensis A.Camus 1935; Quercus fuhsingensis Y.T.Chang

Species of oak tree

Quercus xanthotricha is an Asian species of tree in the beech family Fagaceae. It has been found in Indochina (Laos, Vietnam) and in southern China (Yunnan); the synonym Q. djiringensis suggests it may be distributed as far south as Di Linh in Lâm Đồng Province. It is placed in subgenus Cerris, section Cyclobalanopsis.

== Description ==
Quercus xanthotricha is a small tree growing 5-8 m. tall. Twigs are dark purple. Leaves are 50-80 x 15-30 mm and narrowly elliptic. The acorn is ovoid to ellipsoid, 9-13 mm long x 7-10 mm in diameter, on a stalk up to 40 mm long, with a scar that is 4–6 mm in diameter. The cup is 4-6 mm long x 6-10 mm wide, silky inside, with 5-6 slightly denticulate concentric rings.
