= Bát Nhã Temple =

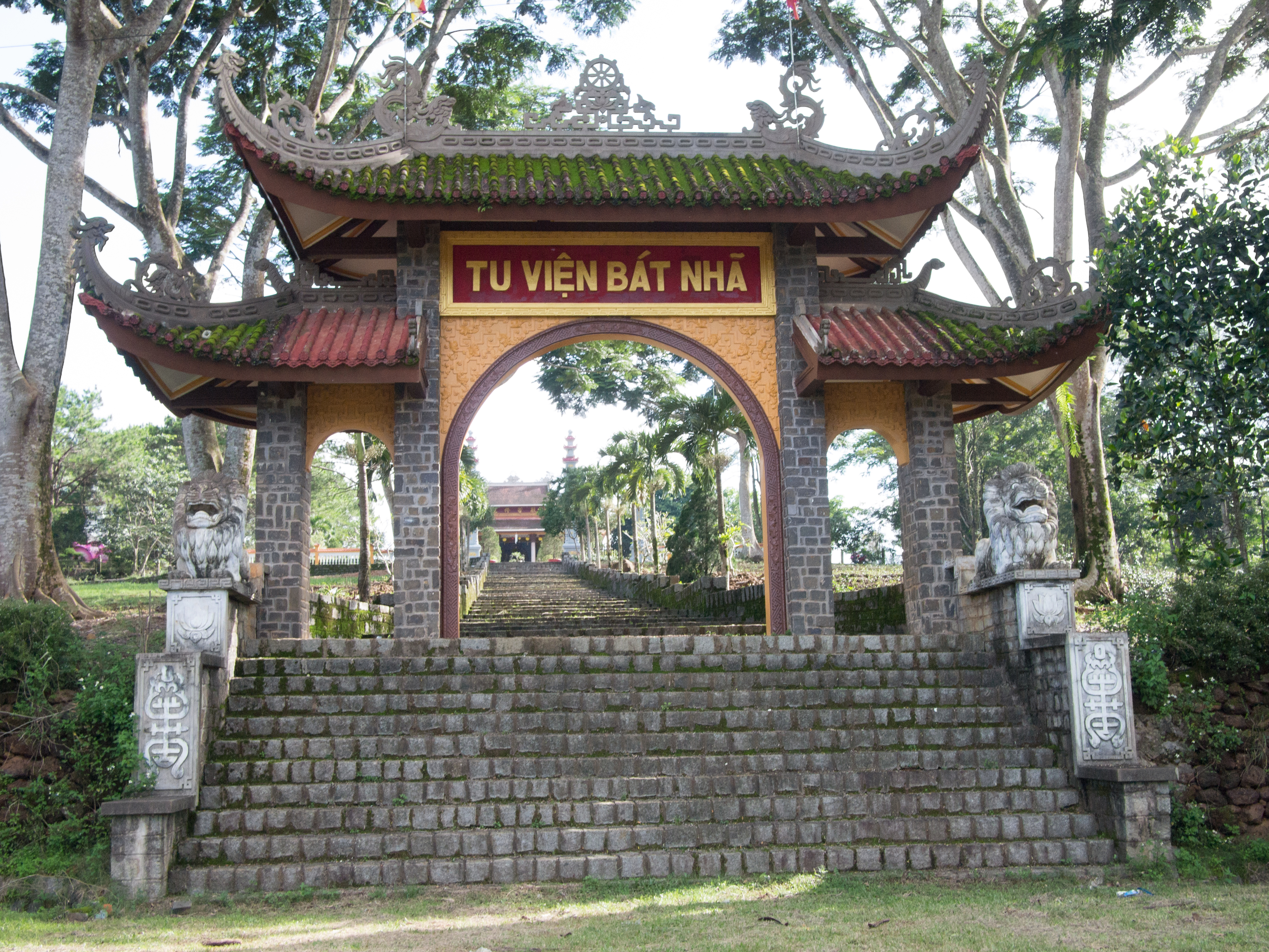
Tam quan of Bát Nhã Temple

Bát Nhã Temple is a monastery in Bảo Lộc, Lâm Đồng Province, Vietnam.

== Background ==
Following 39 years in exile, the widely known Zen Buddhist monk Thich Nhat Hanh returned to Vietnam in 2005. The visit made the front pages of state-owned newspapers. Initially, the group had government approval, and his return raised expectations that religious restrictions would be relaxed in Vietnam. During this visit, Nhat Hanh's followers were invited by Abbot Duc Nghi, a member of the official Buddhist Church of Vietnam, to occupy Bat Nha monastery and continue their practice there. Nhat Hanh's followers claim that during a sacred ceremony at Plum Village Monastery in 2006 Nghi received a transmission from Nhat Hanh and agreed to let them occupy Bat Nha. Nhat Hanh's followers spent $1 million developing the monastery, building a meditation hall for 1,800 people. The official support initially given to Nhat Hanh's supporters is now believed to have been a ploy to get Vietnam off of the US State Department's Religious Freedom blacklist, improve chances of entry into the World Trade Organization, and increase foreign investment.

During a later visit to Vietnam in 2007, Nhat Hanh suggested ending government control of religion to President Nguyen Minh Triet. A provincial police officer later spoke to a reporter about this incident, accusing Nhat Hanh of breaking Vietnamese law. The officer said, “[Nhat Hanh] should focus on Buddhism and keep out of politics.”

In 2008, during an interview in Italian television, Nhat Hanh made some statements regarding the Dalai Lama that his followers claim upset Chinese officials, who in turn put pressure on the Vietnamese government. The chairman of Vietnam's national Committee on Religious Affairs sent a letter which accused Nhat Hanh's organization of publishing false information about Vietnam on its Web site. It was written that the posted information misrepresented Vietnam's policies on religion and could undermine national unity. The chairman requested that Nhat Hanh's followers leave Bat Nha. The letter also stated that Abbot Duc Nghi wished them to leave. “Duc Nghi is breaking a vow that he made to us... We have videotapes of him inviting us to turn the monastery into a place for worship in the Plum Village tradition, even after he dies — life after life. Nobody can go against that wish,” said Brother Phap Kham

== Violent incidents ==
=== Escalation ===
On June 27, 2009 electricity was cut to Bat Nha. Over the next two days mobs wielding sledgehammers, rocks, and feces raided the monastery, threatened the monks and nuns, and damaged buildings. Authorities made a decision to allow Bat Nha to remain occupied until September 2. Nhat Hanh's followers refused to go.

The government continued to represent the issues at Bat Nha as an 'internal' matter among clergy, and the deadline passed quietly.

A memo written by local officials was leaked in early September 2009. It stated, "Plum Village association has abused the religious policies of the party and state to sabotage the regime and oppose the Buddhist Church of Vietnam." The memo claimed that Nhat Hanh's followers were breaking the law by being in the monastery, and strongly encouraged local communist groups to convince the clergy to leave.

On September 21, 2009 a mob formed outside the monastery. Late that night the rooms of about 400 monastics were searched. Two monks had their IDs taken and were ordered to meet with officials the next morning. Calls to the local police chief and other officials by an Associated Press journalist were not answered. Officials continued to characterize the situation as a dispute between Buddhist sects. Nhat Hanh's followers insisted they would remain at Bat Nha and that they had no political agenda.

=== Violence and eviction ===
Early on September 27, 2009 an angry mob of police and apparent villagers broke windows and bashed in the doors of the monastery. The mob dragged about 150 monks from their rooms, where they had been chanting and meditating, and beat them with sticks. The nuns were also beaten. A number of the monks and nuns were sexually assaulted by the mob. More than 30 of the monks were forced into buses which took them away. "Senior monks were dragged like animals out of their rooms, then left sitting in the rain until police dragged them to the taxis where 'black society' bad guys pushed them into cars," a villager said during a phone interview. Two senior monks had their IDs taken and were put under house arrest without charges in their home towns.

When contacted by the press later that day, local police denied that there had been an incident.

U.S. Deputy Secretary of State James Steinberg was in Vietnam that day. During a press briefing he said he was aware of the incident and that he had "expressed our concern" to Vietnamese authorities, and that "We look forward to getting more information from them about the situation."

That evening about 50 monks tried to re-enter the monastery, but were kept out. About 30 monks were still inside, encircled by police.

The next morning, September 28, 2009, about 230 nuns fled for Phuoc Hue monastery, leaving Bat Nha empty. Sister Dang Nghiem said "The Vietnamese government has won. Their 'victory' is that Bat Nha is completely destroyed. Everything is smashed." When contacted by the press that morning the head of the provincial government, Huynh Duc Hoa, denied the incident and refused to answer questions.

=== Refuge at Phuoc Hue monastery ===
376 of the monks and nuns took refuge at nearby Phuoc Hue monastery with the permission of officials of the official Vietnamese Buddhist Church. Police guarded the monastery around the clock. By September 30, 2009 a number of the monks had left under police pressure. Sister Dang Nghiem said, "They are using psychological tactics. They are trying to break them down one by one."

As of October 1, 2009 local officials were still not available to make comments to the press.
