= Bảo Lâm district, Lâm Đồng =

Coordinates: 11.6419°N 107.7236°E

Bảo Lâm district Huyện Bảo Lâm
- District
- Seal
- Interactive map of Bảo Lâm district
- Country: Vietnam
- Region: Central Highlands
- Province: Lâm Đồng province
- Capital: Lộc Thắng

Area
  - Total: 563 sq mi (1,457 km^{2})

Population (2018)
  - Total: 118,420
- Time zone: UTC+7 (Indochina Time)

Bảo Lâm is a district (huyện) of Lâm Đồng province in the Central Highlands region of Vietnam.

As of 2003 the district had a population of 107,279. The district covers an area of 1,457 km². The district capital lies at Lộc Thắng.

It was formed after being split out of Bảo Lộc. Apart from the district seat there are 13 communes in the district: Lộc Quảng, Lộc Ngãi, Lộc Đức, Lộc T'Lâm, Lộc Phú, Lộc Bắc, Lộc Bảo, Lộc An, Lộc Tân, Lộc Thành, Lộc Nam, B'Lá and Tân Lạc.

The main economic activity in the district is the planting of cash crops, the most prominent being tea, coffee and peppercorn as well as some forestry products.

Currently a government mining company is developing a bauxite mine in the area to produce aluminium. 11,000 billion VND (around 600 million USD) has been invested.

The majority of the people in the district are from various minority tribes: especially the Mạ people.
