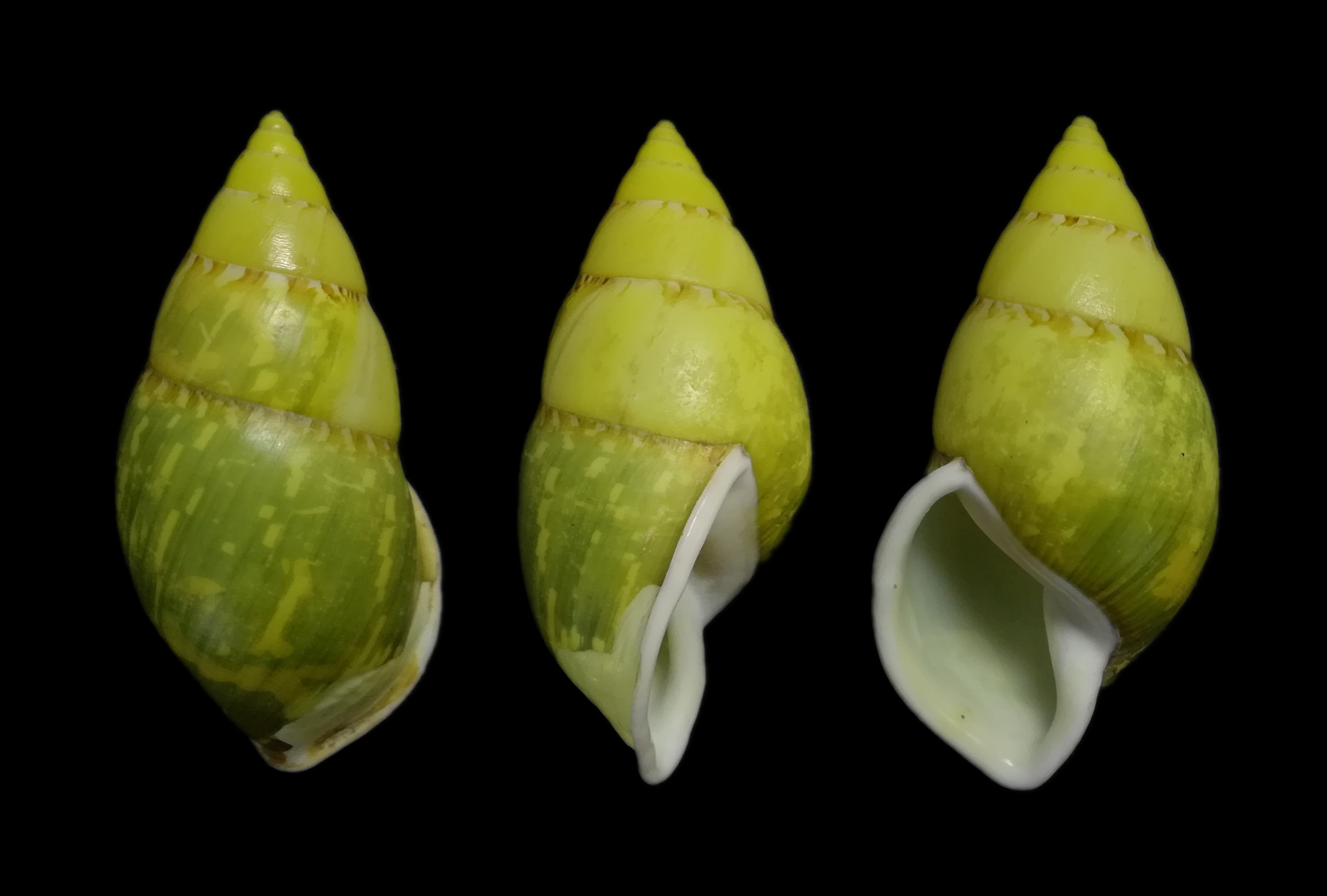

Scientific classification
- Domain: Eukaryota
- Kingdom: Animalia
- Phylum: Mollusca
- Class: Gastropoda
- Order: Stylommatophora
- Family: Camaenidae
- Genus: Amphidromus
- Species: A. heinrichhuberi

Binomial name
- Amphidromus heinrichhuberi Thach & F. Huber, 2016

= Amphidromus heinrichhuberi =

Species of gastropod

Amphidromus heinrichhuberi is a species of large-sized air-breathing tree snail, an arboreal gastropod mollusk in the family Camaenidae.

== Morphology ==
This species is easy to be distinguished from other Amphidromus species by the large adult size, presence of a prominent ridge bordering siphonal fasciole and unique yellow and green periostracum.

== Distribution ==
The type locality is Lâm Đồng Province in south Vietnam.

== Etymology ==
This species is named after Heinrich Huber, father of the second author, Franz Huber, who provided the type material.
