= Mạ people =

Mạ
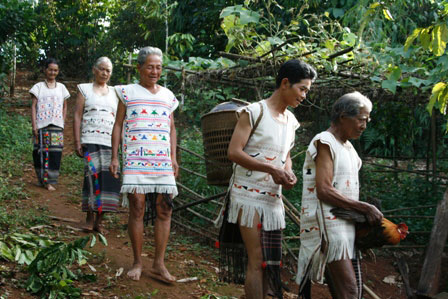

Total population
- Vietnam 50,322 (2019)

Regions with significant populations
- Vietnam

Languages
- Mạ, Vietnamese, others

Religion
- Animism • Theravada Buddhism

The Mạ or Maa (Vietnamese: Người Mạ) are a Mon–Khmer indigenous people of Vietnam; as of 2019, they had a population of 50,322. They are concentrated mostly in the Lâm Đồng and Đồng Nai province of the country, particularly in the area of the upper Đồng Nai River. They are very close to the Koho people.

The Ma achieved some form of political unity and a stratified society before the 19th century due to the influence of the Funan. This, however, broke down due to varying factors such as the French colonization, inter-group warfare, and slave trading. The Mon-Khmer-speaking group called Cho Ro is identified by some ethnologists as a subgroup of the Ma people.

== Culture ==
=== Language ===
The Mạ or Maa language comes under the Mon-Khmer Group: this and the Koho language are sometimes considered to be different dialects only. Jean Boulbet and Lê et al. describe the following Mạ subgroups. There are over 16,000 Mạ people living in Lộc Thắng, Lộc Bắc, Lộc Tân, Lộc Lâm, Lộc Ngãi, and Lộc Châu communes in Bảo Lộc District; Đạ Teh, Đạ M’rê, Đạ Huoai, Đồng Nai, and Ma Đa Gui communes in Đạ Huoai District; Đạ Đờn and Phú Sơn communes in Đức Trọng District; Đinh Trang Thượng commune in northern Di Linh District (Lê et al. 2014:310). These districts all belong to Lâm Đồng Province.

- Mạ Ngăn: the main Mạ subgroup, who live in the Đạ Đơng river basin. Lộc Bắc, Lộc Trung, Lộc Lâm communes of Bảo Lộc District, Lâm Đồng Province.
- Mạ Tô: in upstream La Ngà (Đạ Rnga) River, B'Lao (Bảo Lộc) plateau. Many are in close contact with the Koho people.
- Mạ Krung or Mạ Đa Gui: in the southern plains, from southeastern Bảo Lộc District, Đạ Huoai District, Lâm Đồng Province to Định Quán District, Đồng Nai Province.
- Mạ Xốp: in Lộc Bắc (B'Lach) commune, Bảo Lộc District, and some in Lộc Trung commune of the same district.

Le (2003) covers the Maa varieties of Dagui, Chop, and Tadung.

=== Folklore ===
The Mạ have a rich oral traditions, and their culture is a tapestry of folklore. Myths, parables, and legends are an integral part of this ethnic group. A detailed description the beliefs, customs, ethno-geography and botany of the Mạ people is given by Jean Boulbet, having lived in what is now the Cát Tiên and Bảo Lâm districts in the 1950-60s: before the extensive influx of lowland people to the region.

=== Traditional attire ===
The Mạ are also known for their traditional colorful attire. Mạ women wear skirts that reach well below their knees. The men customarily wear loincloth.
