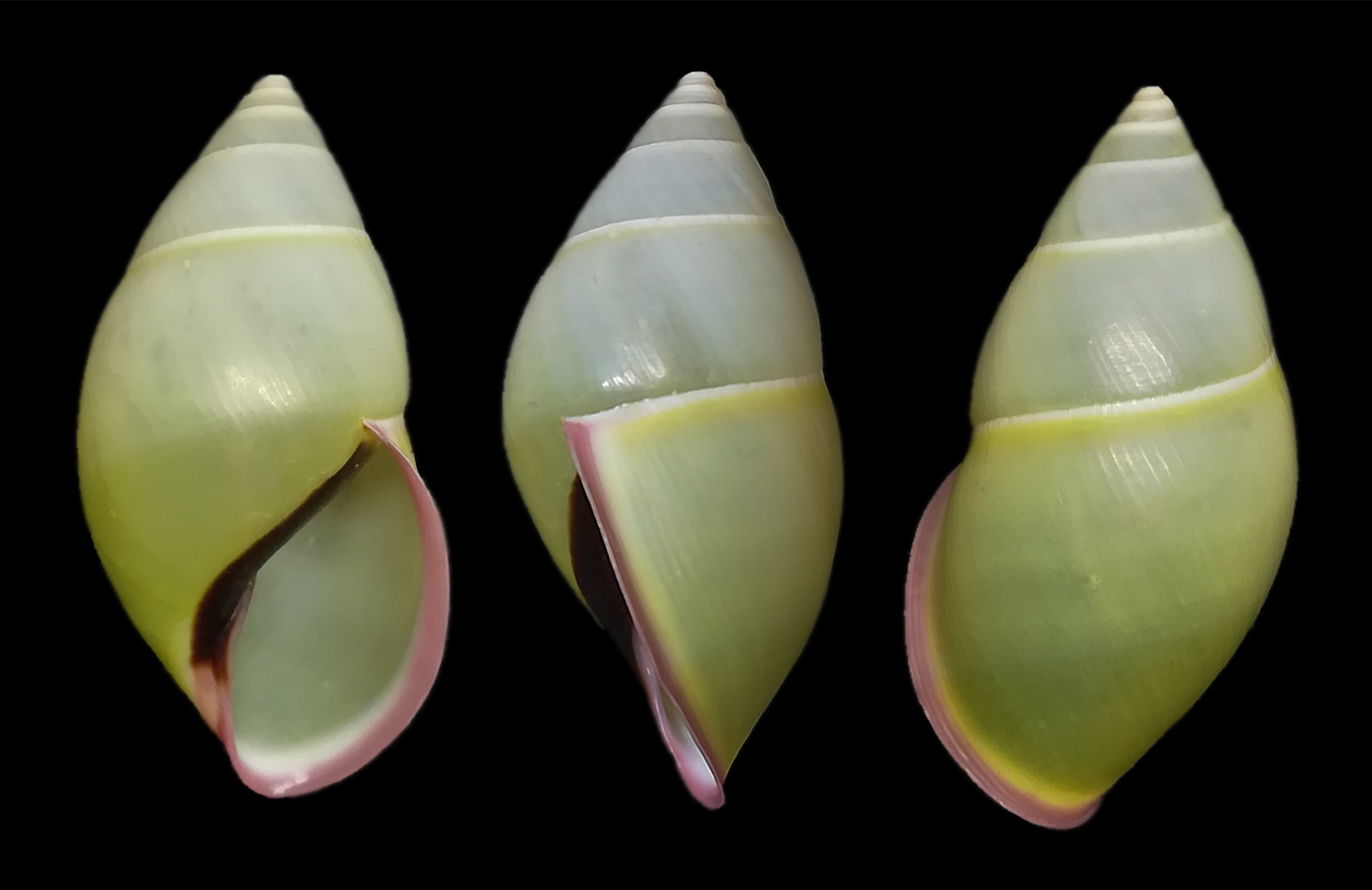

Scientific classification
- Kingdom: Animalia
- Phylum: Mollusca
- Class: Gastropoda
- Order: Stylommatophora
- Family: Camaenidae
- Genus: Amphidromus
- Species: A. phamanhi

Binomial name
- Amphidromus phamanhi Thach, 2016

= Amphidromus phamanhi =

Species of snail in the family Camaenidae

Amphidromus phamanhi is a species of air-breathing land snail, a terrestrial pulmonate gastropod mollusc in the family Camaenidae.

== Habitat ==
This species is found among leaf litter.

== Distribution ==
The type locality of this species is Lâm Đồng Province, Vietnam.

== Etymology ==
This species is named after Phạm Ngọc Anh from Vietnam who provided the type material.
