= Di Linh =

Di Linh Xã Di Linh
- Commune
- Location in Vietnam
- Coordinates: 11.577775°N 108.075093°E
- Country: Vietnam
- Province: Lâm Đồng Province

Area
  - Total: 9.52 sq mi (24.65 km^{2})

Population
  - Total: 27,645
  - Density: 2,910/sq mi (1,122/km^{2})
- Time zone: UTC+7 (UTC+7)

Di Linh is a commune (xã) of Lâm Đồng Province, Vietnam. Situated on Route 20 between Bảo Lộc and Da Lat, the original name was Djiring: as used by minority people going back to the French period.

== Origin and History ==
An early visitor to Di Linh was doctor Alexandre John Emile Yersin in 1890 on his travels to Da Lat. "Djiring" was the administrative centre for the French administration's Đồng Nai Thượng (upper Đồng Nai) region from its establishment on 1 November 1899, and has since remained an economic, cultural, social and political centre for the area. The colonial administrative building was completed in 1900 (after many repairs it is now the headquarters of the People's Council of Di Linh district).

The name Di Linh was officially changed from Djiring in 1958 by the Ngô Đình Diệm regime (also B'lao, D'ran and Lien Khanh). The origin of "Djiring" may have come from the name of a local chieftain, or it may refer to beeswax: jrềng, because there are many wild bees in this area. Minority people were forced to work as transporters of materials to build the first administrative facilities and roads; they later established a village and collected wild honey, hence jrềng, which was transcribed incorrectly to Djiring. Another theory is that it is derived from “njrêng”: a type of oak tree that grows in the Di Linh area. It is easy to bend, so local people used it for many things such as: agricultural tools, or splitting it into thin pieces to weave the legs of baskets (ethnic rattan baskets are worn on the back and designed to stay upright when placed on the ground).

== Geography ==
Di Linh district is bordered by Duc Trong district to the east, Bao Lam district to the west, Binh Thuan province to the south, and Dak Nong and Lam Ha districts to the north. The district has a diverse terrain, consisting of mainly two types of topography: Binh Son Nguyen topography and high mountain terrain. The former is relatively flat and distributed along NH 20, making it suitable for growing industrial crops. The latter is located in the south and southwest of the district and is mainly used for forestry development, with protective functions and environmental protection.

The district's agricultural lands are primarily distributed along National Highway 20 and inter-commune and commune roads, thereby providing an advantageous position for agricultural production. Additionally, the terrain allows for the construction of reservoirs and small irrigation works.

Di Linh district includes Di Linh town and 18 communes, which are Bao Thuan, Dinh Lac, Dinh Trang Hoa, Dinh Trang Thuong, Gia Bac, Gia Hiep, Gung Ré, Hoa Bac, Hoa Nam, Hoa Ninh, Hoa Ninh, Hoa Trung, Lien Dam, Son Dien, Tam Bo, Tan Chau, Tan Nghia, Tan Thuong and Tan Lam. The district encompasses 183 villages and residential groups.

== Climate ==
Di Linh district is located in a tropical monsoon climate zone, with a dry season in December-March. At an altitude of around 900m, air temperatures are moderate throughout the year (average about 22 °C), with the highest temperature (25 °C) occurring in May and the lowest (17 °C) in February. The district receives 2,122 hours of sunshine per year, with the most sunny hours (232) occurring in January and the least sunny hours (83) occurring in October.

The annual rainfall in the district is 2,616 mm, with the highest rainfall (332 mm) occurring in October and the lowest rainfall (3.9 mm) in February. The average humidity is 83%, with the highest humidity (89%) in October and the lowest humidity (67%) in February.

Thị Trấn Di Linh

Climate chart (precipitation, max. and min. temperature)
| J | F | M | A | M | J | J | A | S | O | N | D |
| 23 24 15 | 20 27 16 | 90 29 17 | 162 27 18 | 227 25 18 | 254 24 18 | 259 21 18 | 230 22 17 | 368 22 17 | 196 23 17 | 133 22 17 | 30 23 16 |
- █ Average max. and min. temperatures in °C
- █ Precipitation totals in mm
Imperial conversion
| J | F | M | A | M | J | J | A | S | O | N | D |
| 0.9 75 59 | 0.8 81 61 | 3.5 84 63 | 6.4 81 64 | 8.9 77 64 | 10 75 64 | 10 70 64 | 9.1 72 63 | 14 72 63 | 7.7 73 63 | 5.2 72 63 | 1.2 73 61 |
- █ Average max. and min. temperatures in °F
- █ Precipitation totals in inches
