= Di Linh district =

Coordinates: 11.500°N 108.117°E

Di Linh, Lâm Đồng Huyện Di Linh, Lâm Đồng
- District
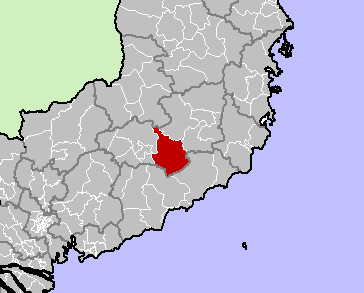
- Location in Lâm Đồng province
- Country: Vietnam
- Region: Central Highlands
- Province: Lâm Đồng province
- Capital: Di Linh

Area
  - Land: 629 sq mi (1,628 km^{2})

Population (2003)
  - Total: 154,472
- Time zone: UTC+7 (Indochina Time)

Di Linh (Vietnamese: Di Linh; French: Djiring) is a district (huyện) of Lâm Đồng province in the Central Highlands region of Vietnam.

As of 2003, the district had a population of 154,472. The district covers an area of 1,628 km^{2}. The district capital lies at Di Linh.
