= National Route 20 (Vietnam) =

Road in Vietnam

National Route 20
- Quốc lộ 20
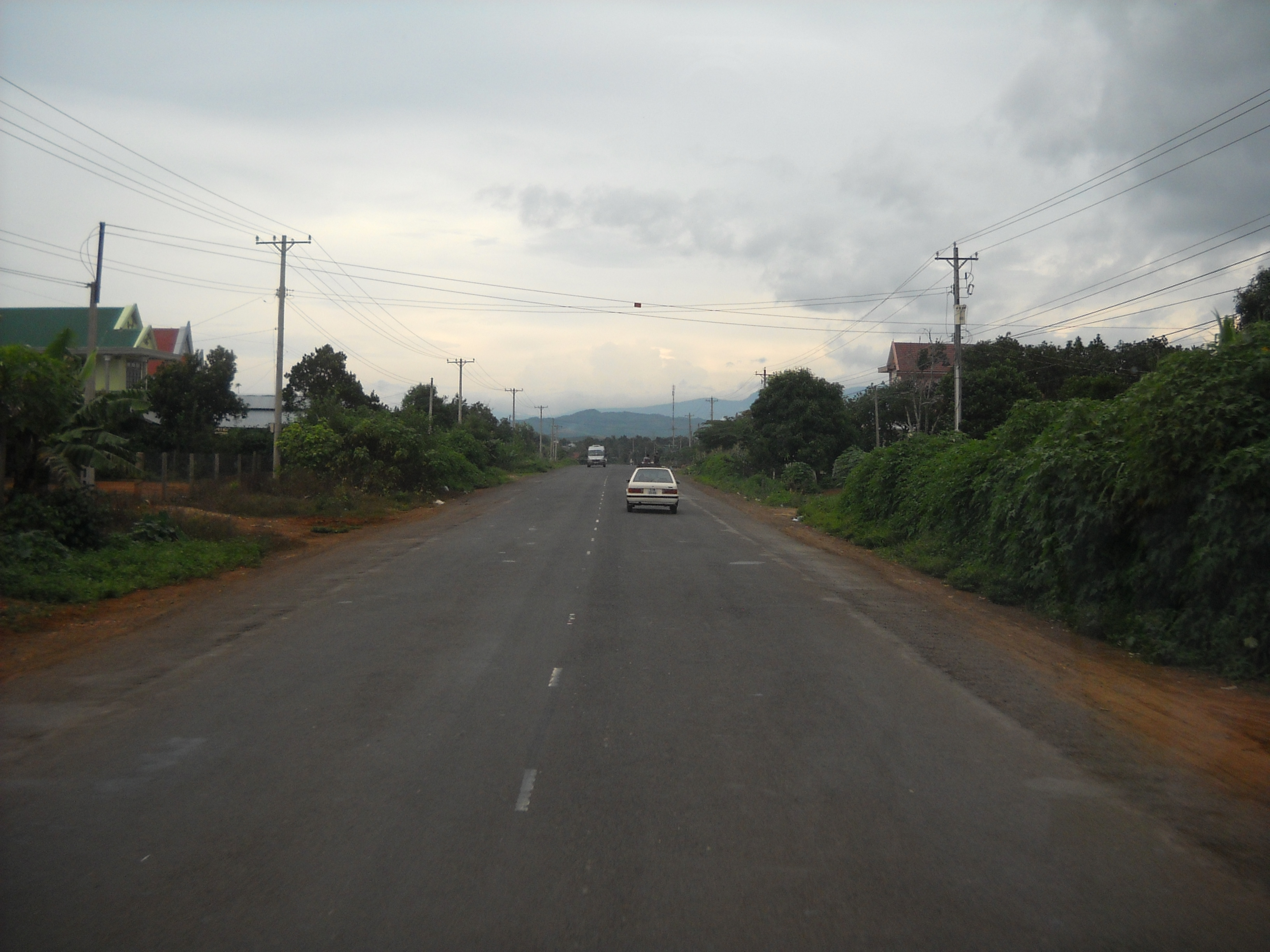

Route information
- Length: 264 km (164 mi)

Major junctions
- South end: in Dầu Giây, Thống Nhất district, Đồng Nai
- in Liên Khương, Đức Trọng district, Lâm Đồng province; in Pass Prenn, Đức Trọng district, Lâm Đồng province
- North end: in Da Lat, Lâm Đồng province

Location
- Country: Vietnam

Highway system
- Transport in Vietnam
← QL 19D	→ QL 21

National Route 20 (Vietnamese: Quốc lộ 20) is a highway in southern and central Vietnam connecting Dau Giay in Đồng Nai with Da Lat in Lâm Đồng province. It is the main route into the Central Highlands and to Da Lat from Ho Chi Minh City.

The highway starts on at Dau Giay junction, from National Route 1, the north–south highway. Just a few km further east, the Ho Chi Minh City–Long Thanh–Dau Giay Expressway branches off National Route 1A. The road leads north through densely populated countryside with rubber plantations, fruit orchards and farmland, on the banks of Tri An Reservoir. North of Tan Phu, the landscape becomes hilly, entering the Central Highlands. In Đạ Huoai District, the road leads through a pass, entering the highland around Bảo Lộc. Further north, the road passes through Liên Khương, Đức Trọng District, where the Dau Giay-Dalat Expressway branches off. The road then leads through Pass Prenn, before descending towards Da Lat.

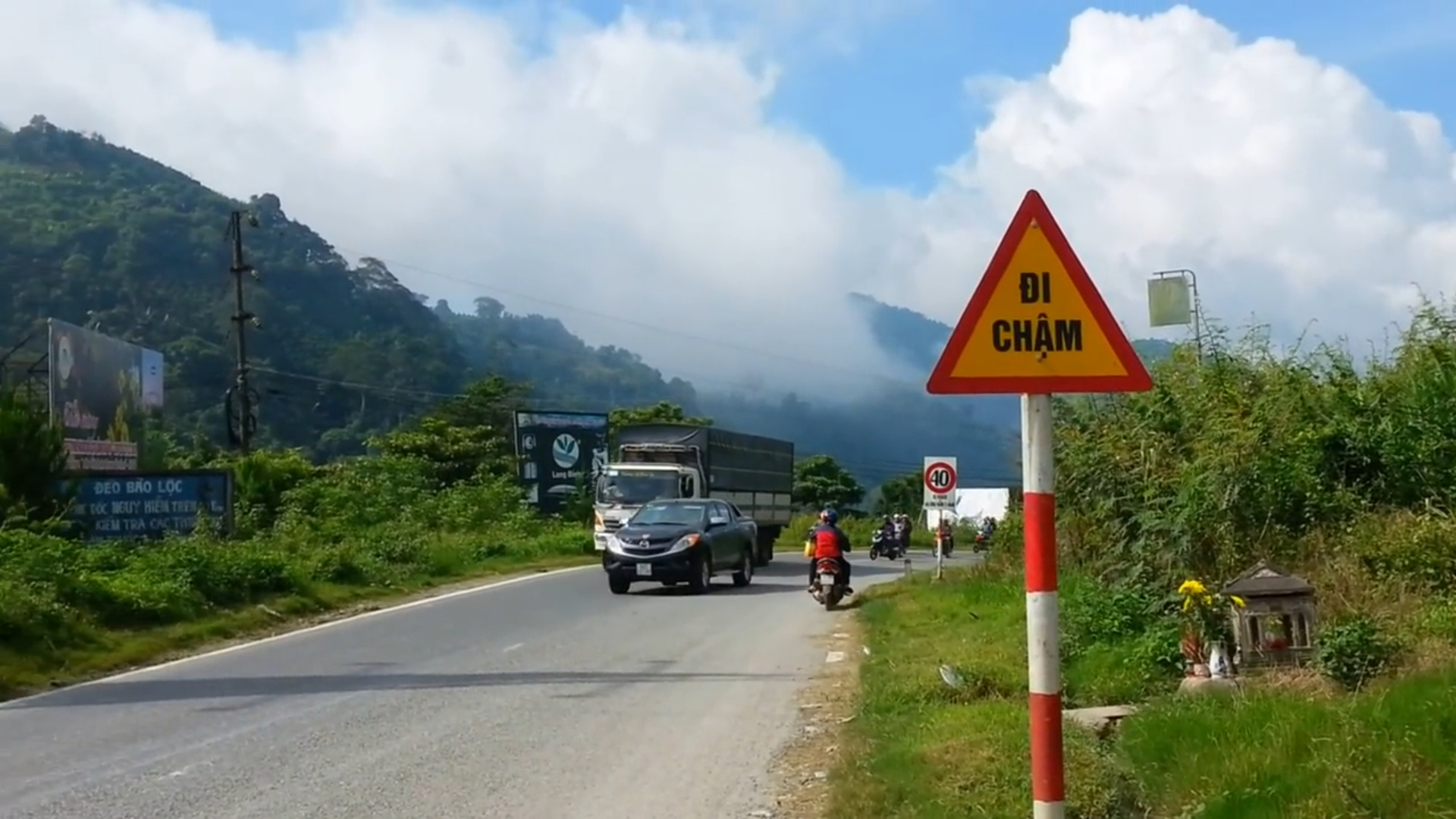
Bao Loc pass

The road has been described as a 'death road', with many accidents occurring due to high traffic, numerous trucks (carrying agricultural products between the Central Highlands and southern Vietnam), and high tourist traffic.
