= Đơn Dương district =

Coordinates: 11.8072°N 108.5467°E

Đơn Dương district Huyện Đơn Dương
- District
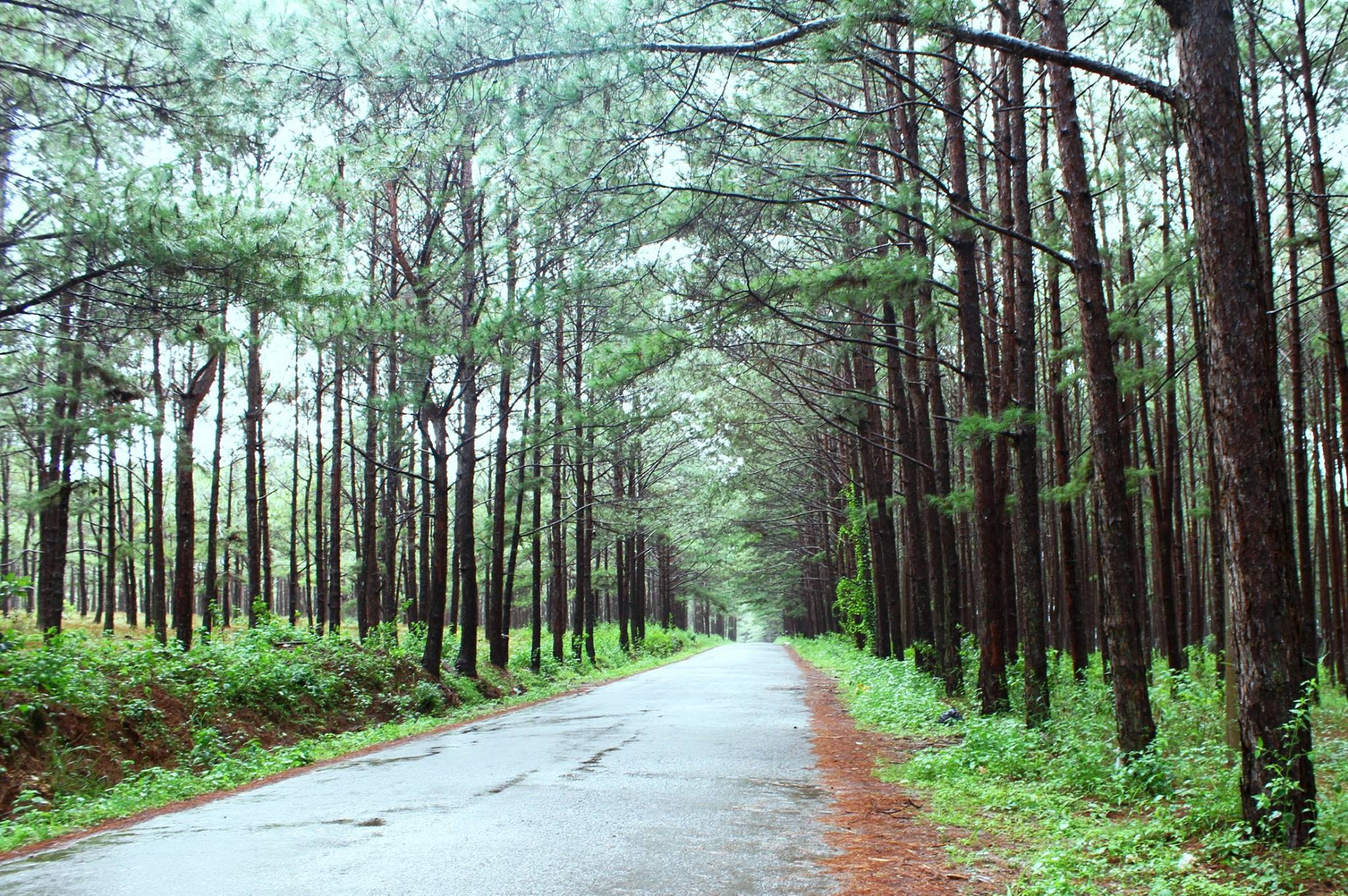
- Châu Sơn – Đơn Dương pine forest.

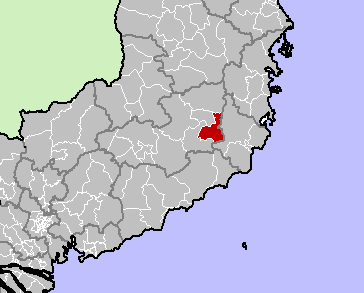
- Location in Lâm Đồng province
- Country: Vietnam
- Region: Central Highlands
- Province: Lâm Đồng province
- Capital: Thạnh Mỹ

Area
  - District: 236 sq mi (612 km^{2})

Population (2018)
  - District: 178,100
  - Density: 450/sq mi (175/km^{2})
  - Urban: 27,683
- Time zone: UTC+7 (Indochina Time)
- Website: donduong.lamdong.gov.vn

Đơn Dương is a former district (huyện) of Lâm Đồng province in the Central Highlands region of Vietnam.

== History ==
Its name Đơn-dương in Kinh language was originated from a Mnong word Daàm-krông, which mean "the big waterfalls".

As of 2003 the district had a population of 92,260. The district covers an area of 612 km². The district capital lies at Thạnh Mỹ.

== See also ==
- Di Linh
- Lâm Viên
- Lang Biang
