= Cát Tiên archaeological site =

Archaeological site in Vietnam

Coordinates: 11°31′42″N 107°23′56″E

Location of Cát Tiên Holy Land

Cát Tiên archaeological site or Cát Tiên Sanctuary (Vietnamese: Thánh địa Cát Tiên) is an archaeological site located between the two sectors of Cát Tiên National Park, Cát Tiên District, Lâm Đồng Province, southern Central Highlands. Accidentally discovered in 1985, the site has been subjected to debate among historians about its origin. The highly Indianized civilization which developed this site inhabited it between the 4th century and 9th centuries AD. The hill temple 1A of Cát Tiên features the largest stone lingam ever found in Southeast Asia.

== Gallery ==
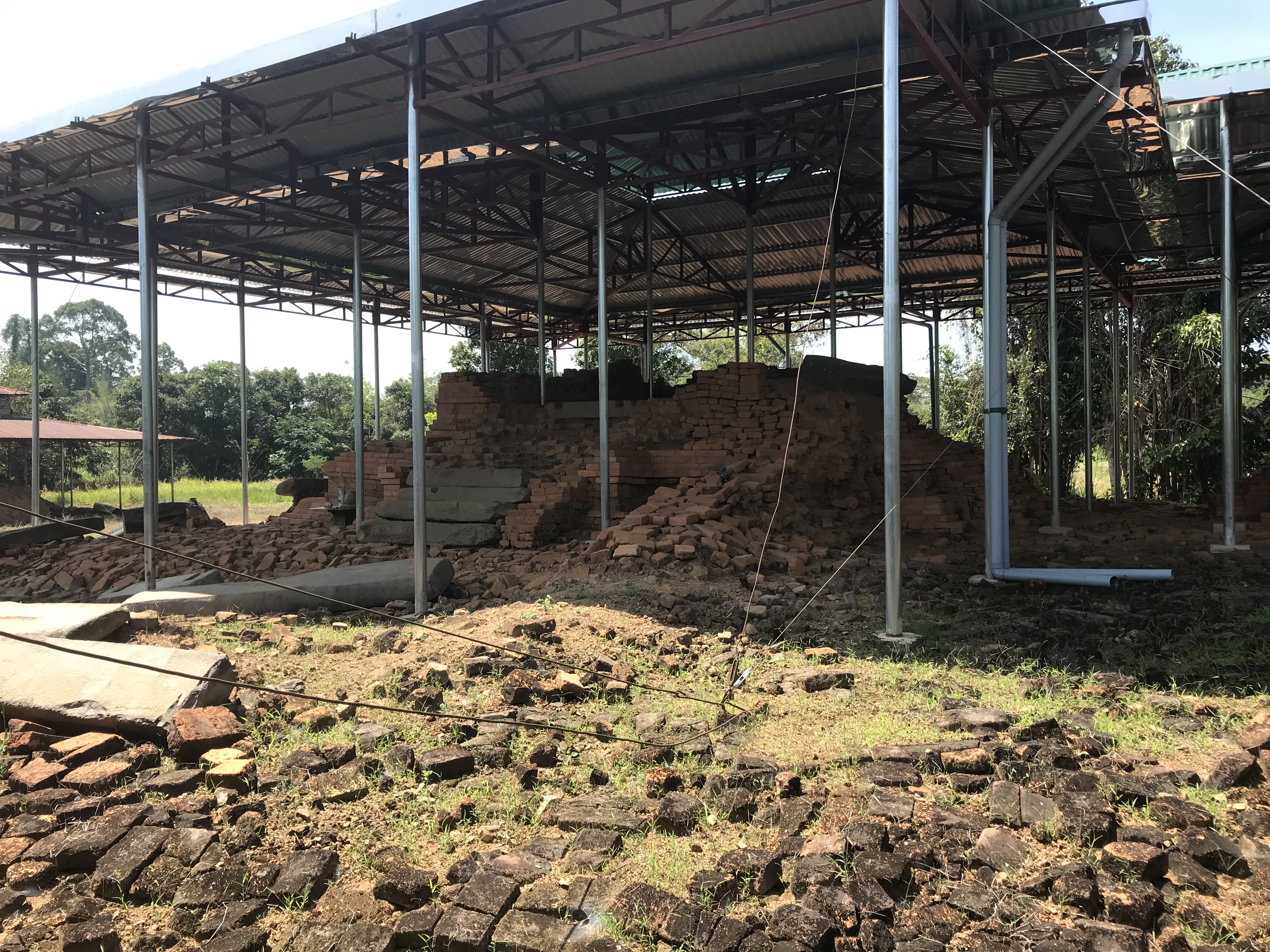
One of the temples at mound no.2

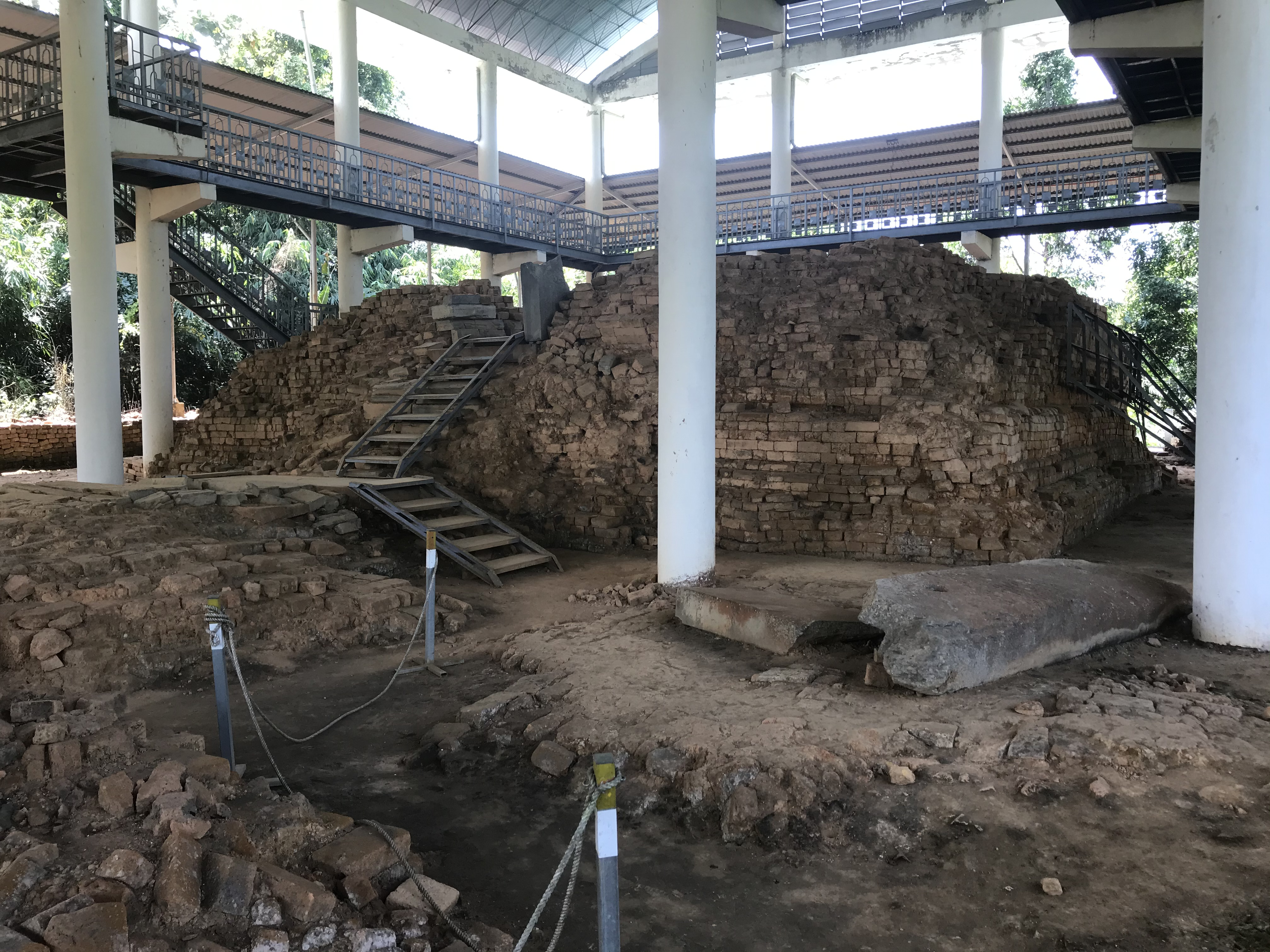
Temple 1A on top of a hill

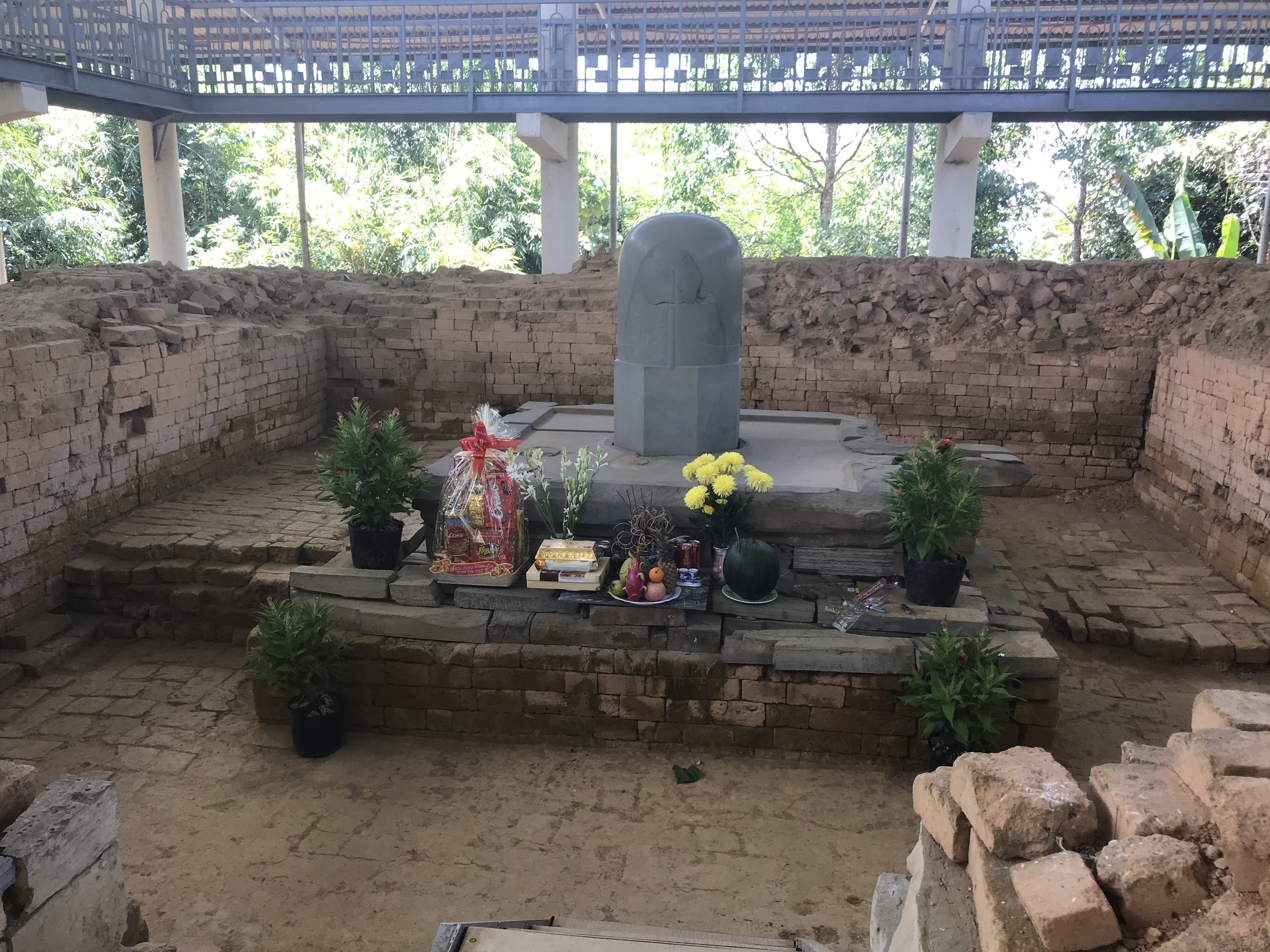
Stone lingam at temple 1A, at 2.1 meter tall, this is the largest stone lingam ever found in Southeast Asia

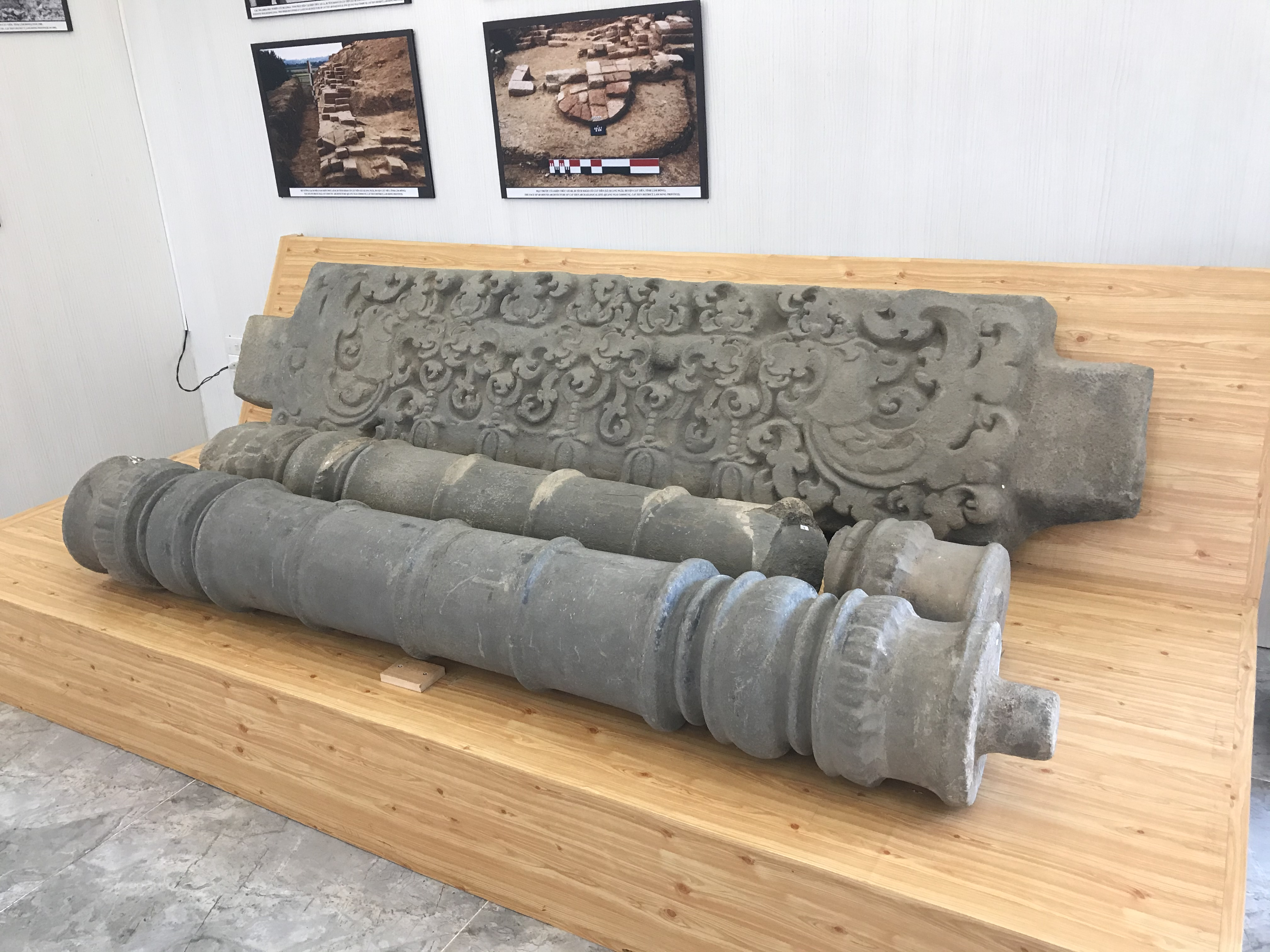
Lintels of temple, Cát Tiên Museum exhibition

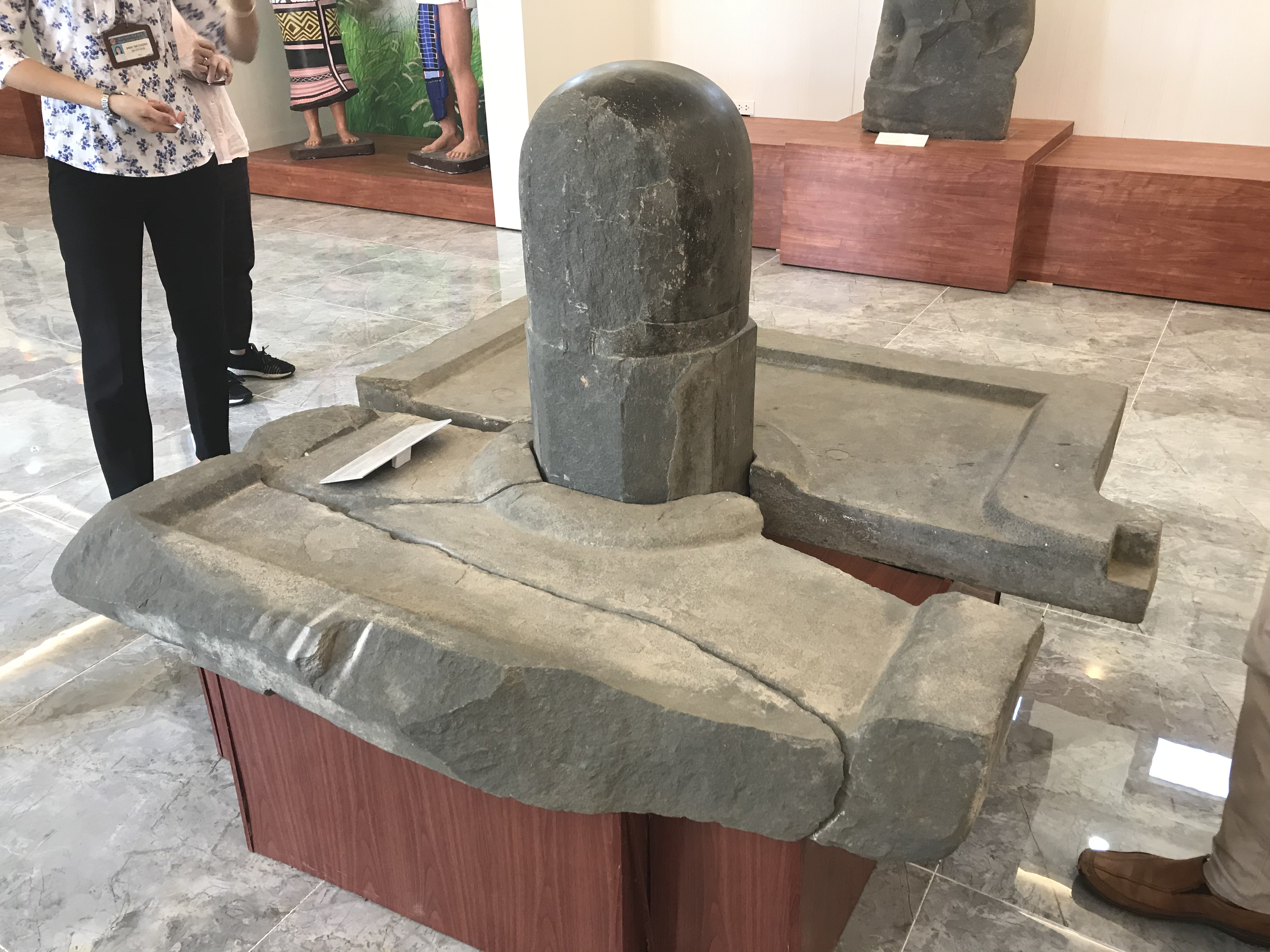
A stone linga

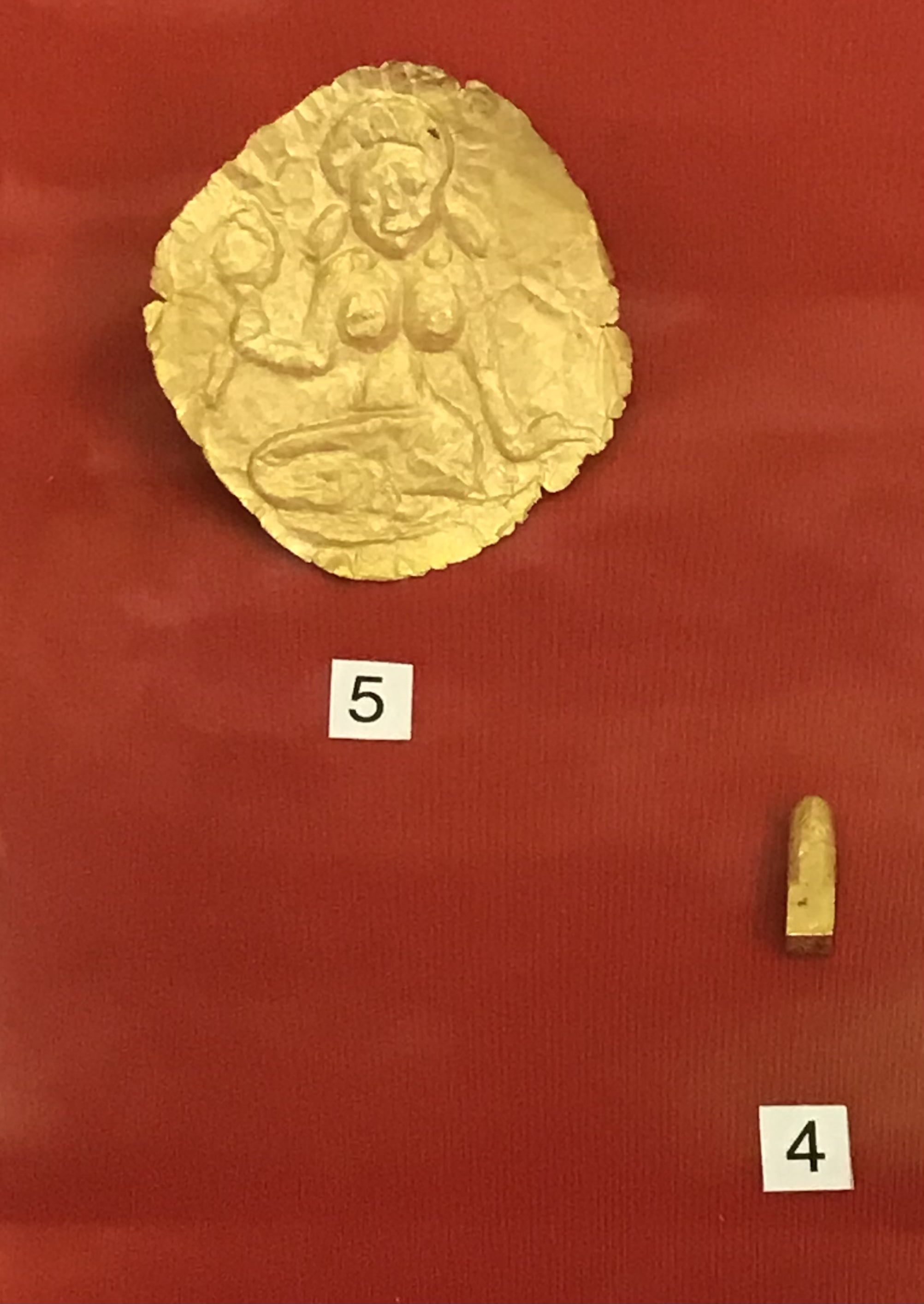
Golden leaf with Lakshmi figure. Golden lingam amulet

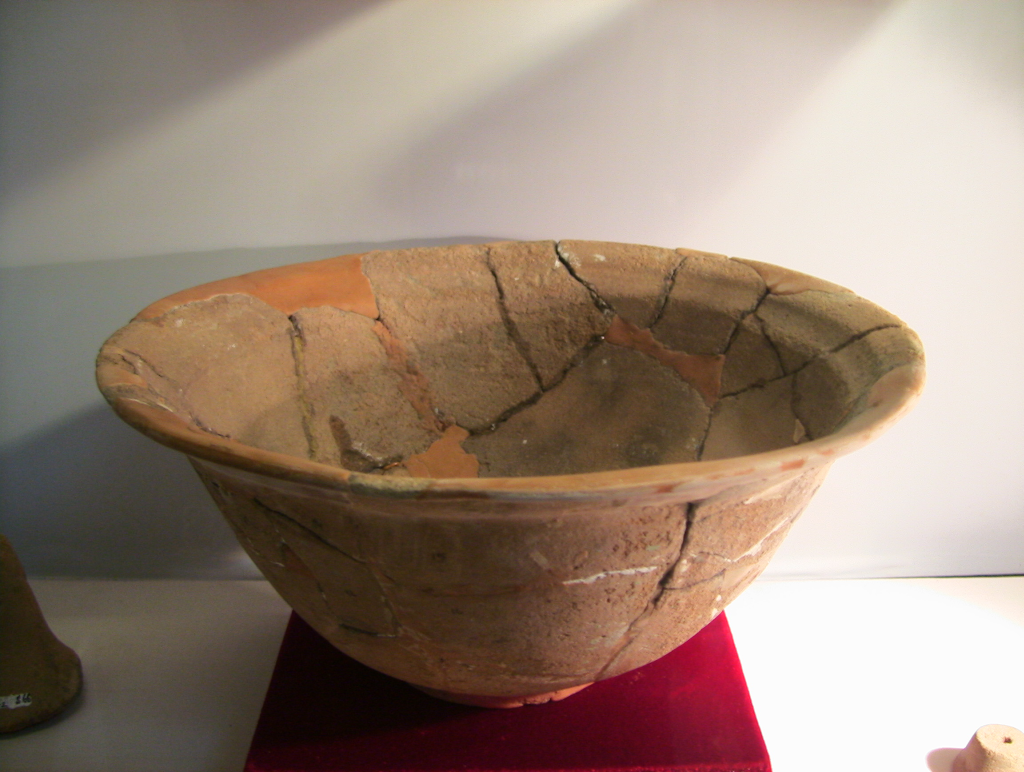
A ceramic bowl, Vietnam Museum of History

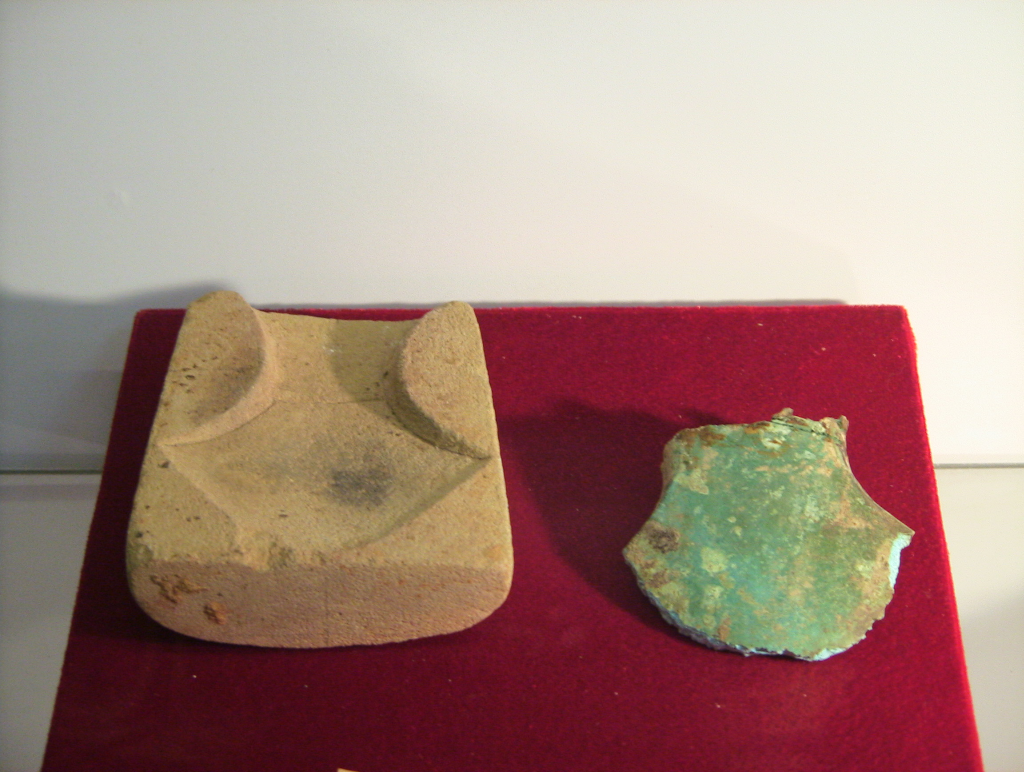
Copper axe and mold

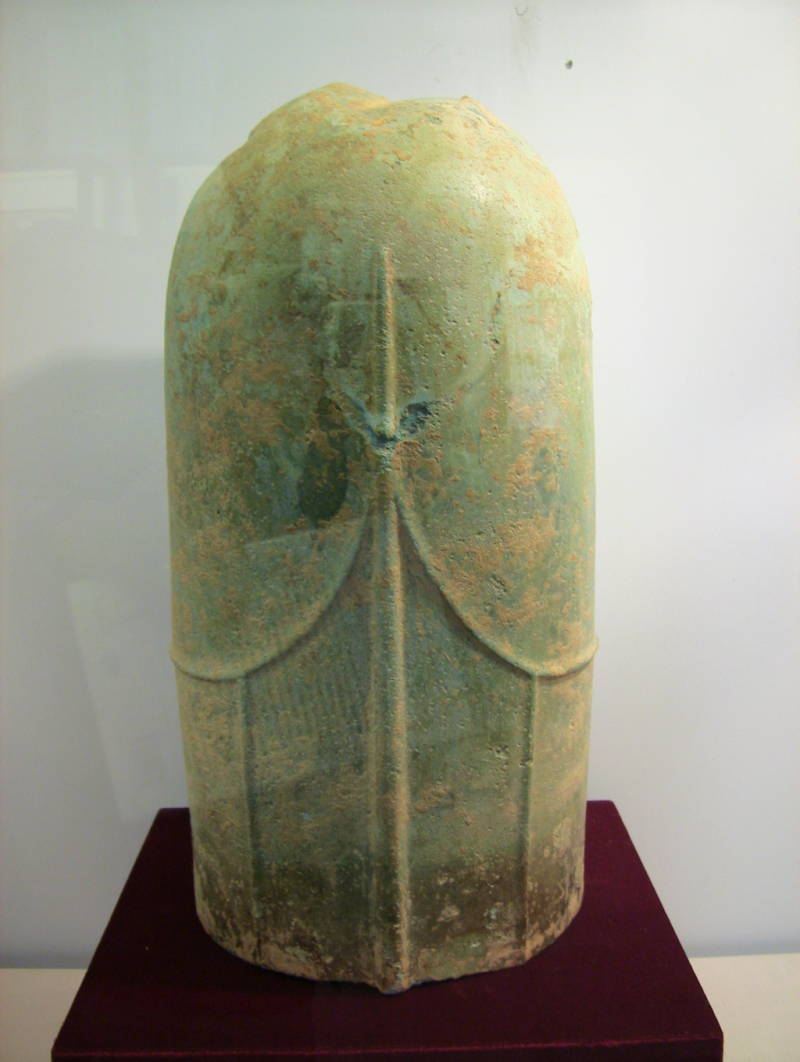
A copper linga

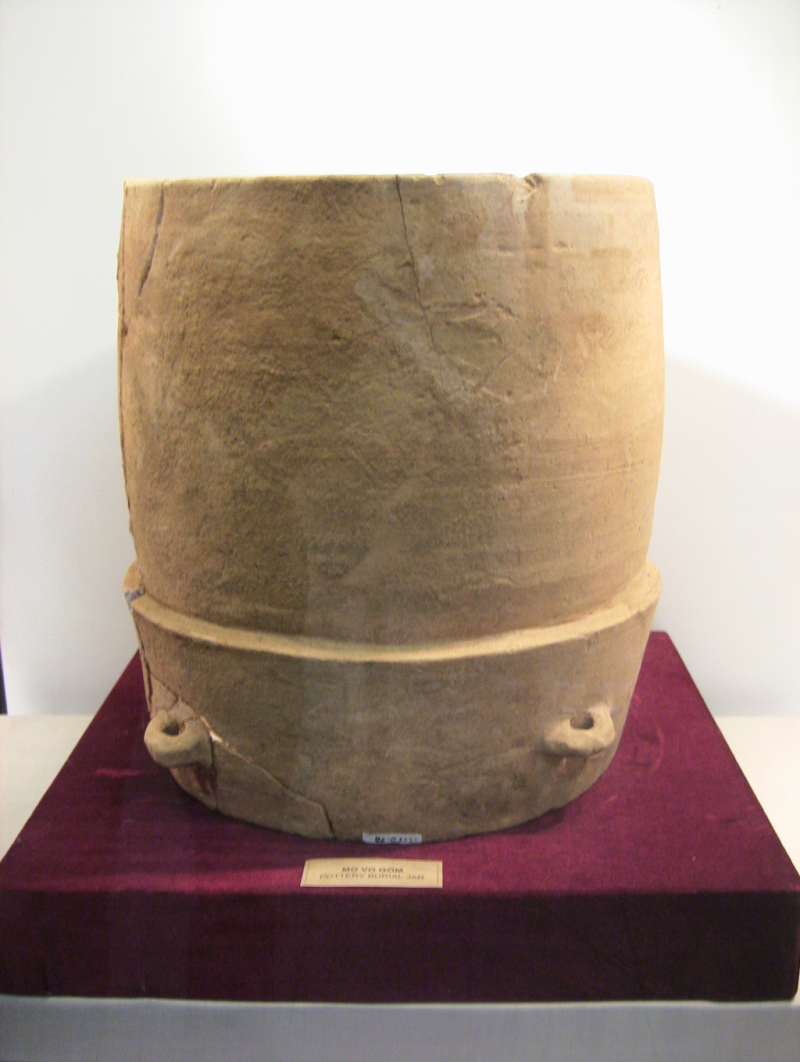
Ceramic burial jar

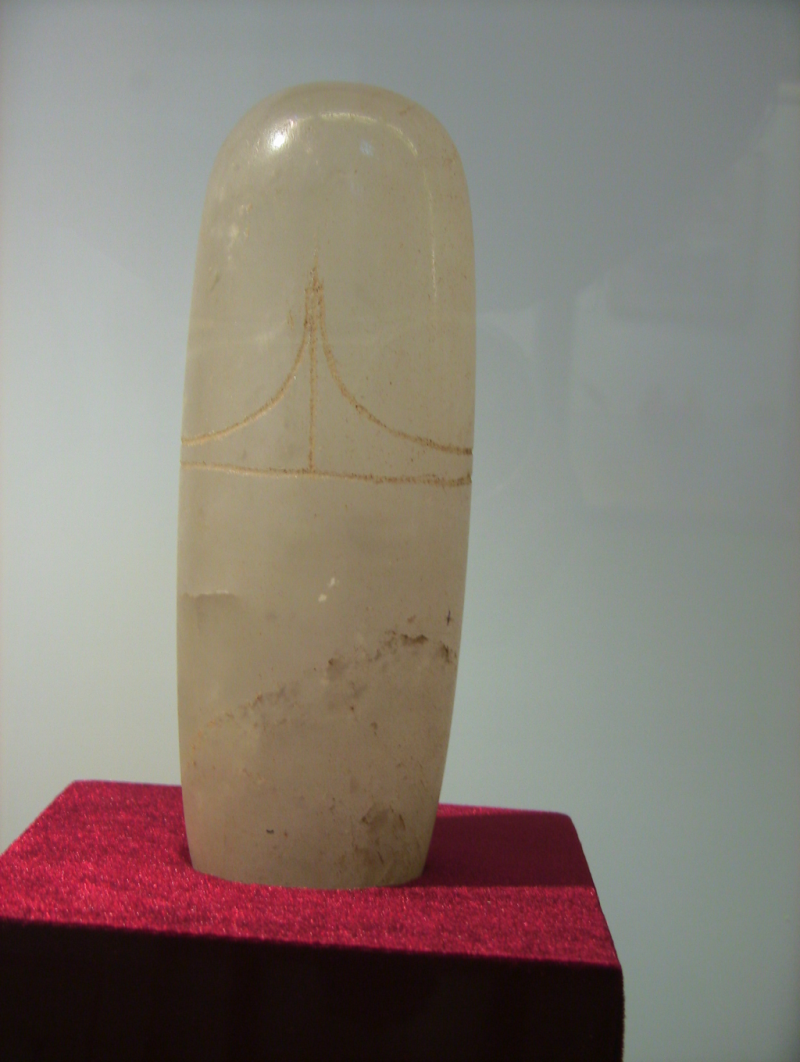
Crystal linga

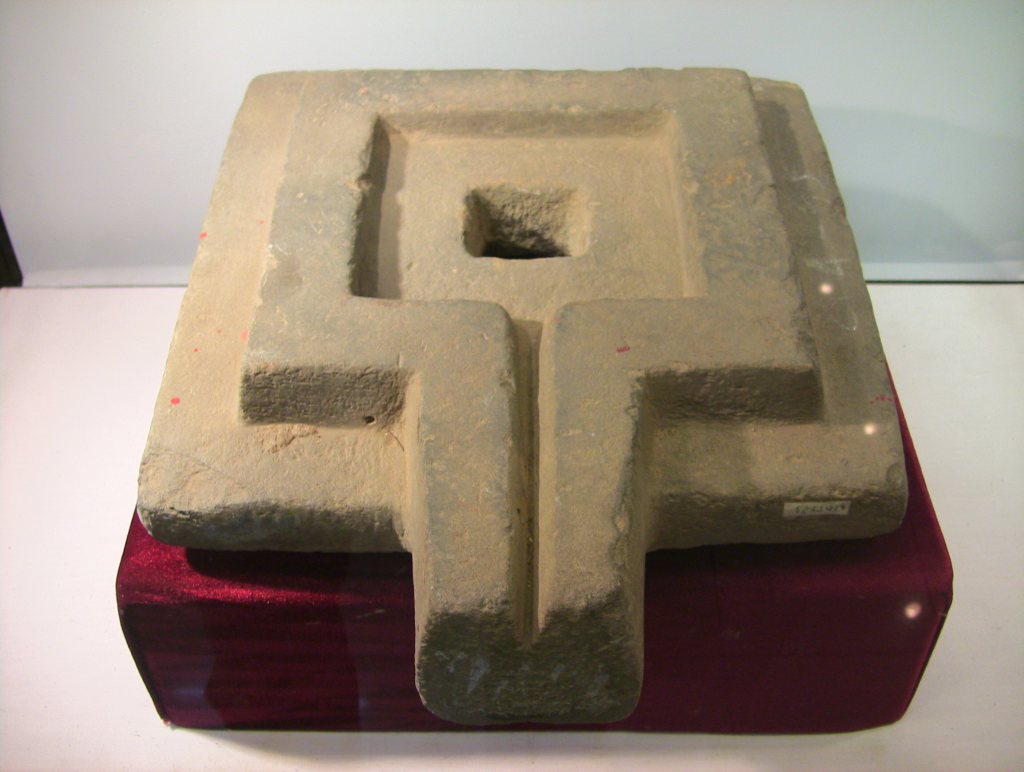
Stone yoni

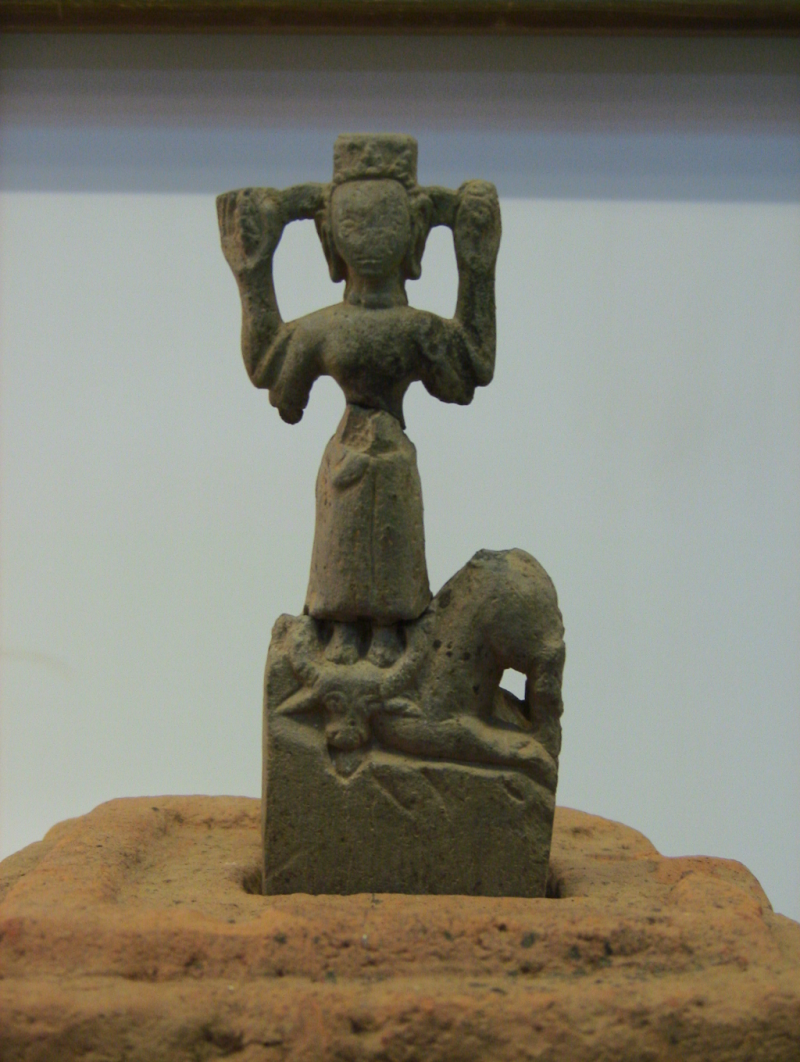
A statue of Uma riding the Mahisa buffalo

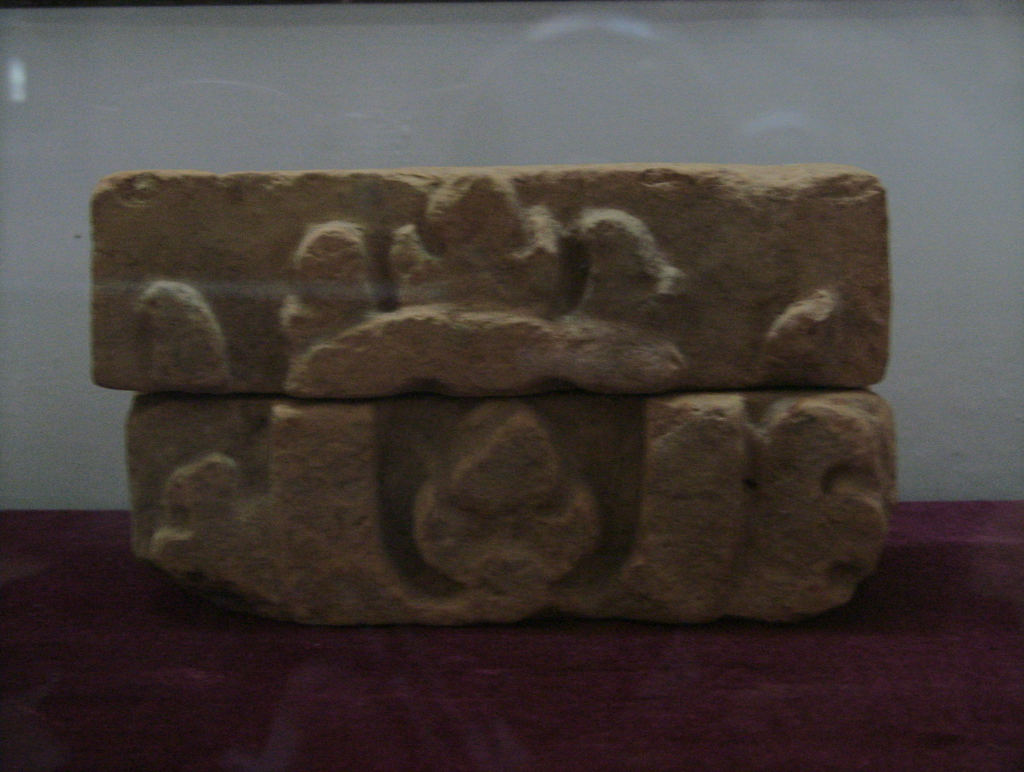
Bricks for tower building
