= Đạ Tẻh district =

Coordinates: 11.5628°N 107.5333°E

Đạ Tẻh district Huyện Đạ Tẻh
- District
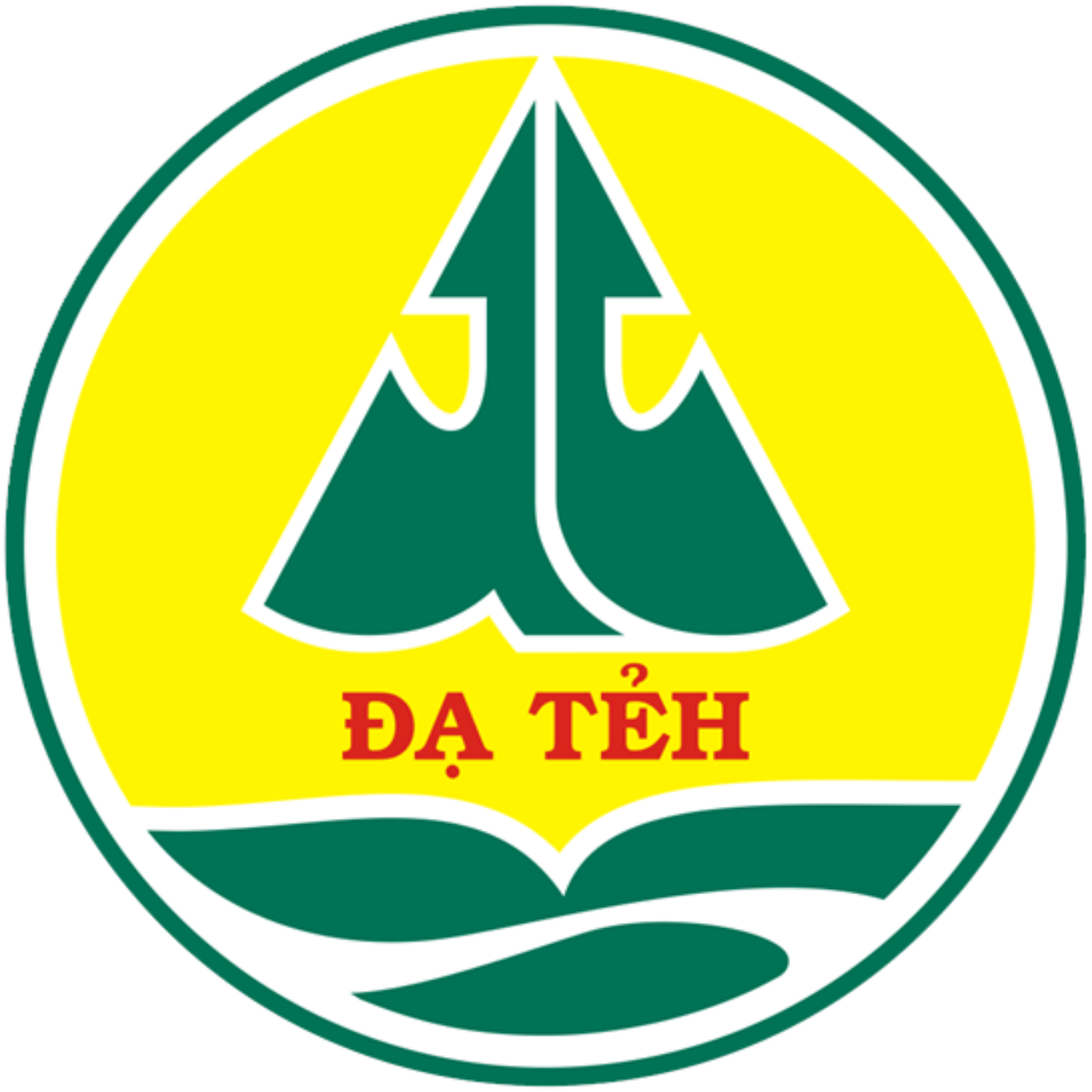
- Seal

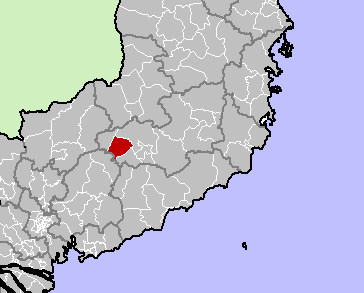
- Location in Lâm Đồng province
- Country: Vietnam
- Region: Central Highlands
- Province: Lâm Đồng
- Capital: Đạ Tẻh

Area
  - Total: 202 sq mi (524 km^{2})

Population (2003)
  - Total: 48,590
- Time zone: UTC+7 (Indochina Time)

Đạ Tẻh is a rural district (huyện) of Lâm Đồng province in the Central Highlands region of Vietnam. As of 2003, the district had a population of 48,590. The district covers an area of 524 km^{2}. The district capital lies at Đạ Tẻh.

== Name ==
This district's name Đạ Tẻh or Daa-teh means "the stream of typing" in Mạ language.
