= Xuân Hương – Đà Lạt =

- Ward
- Interactive map of Xuân Hương – Đà Lạt
- Country: Vietnam
- Province: Lâm Đồng
- Time zone: UTC+07:00 (Indochina Time)

Xuân Hương – Đà Lạt (Phường Xuân Hương – Đà Lạt) is a ward of Lâm Đồng Province, Vietnam.
