= Cát Tiên =

Cát Tiên Xã Cát Tiên
- Commune
- Location in Vietnam
- Coordinates: 11.583212°N 107.362153°E
- Country: Vietnam
- Province: Lâm Đồng Province

Area
  - Total: 7.82 sq mi (20.25 km^{2})

Population (2013)
  - Total: 11,319
  - Density: 1,450/sq mi (559/km^{2})
- Time zone: UTC+07:00

Cát Tiên is a commune (xã) of Lâm Đồng Province, Vietnam.
