= Đạ Huoai district =

Coordinates: 11.4531°N 107.6356°E

Đạ Huoai district Huyện Đạ Huoai
- District
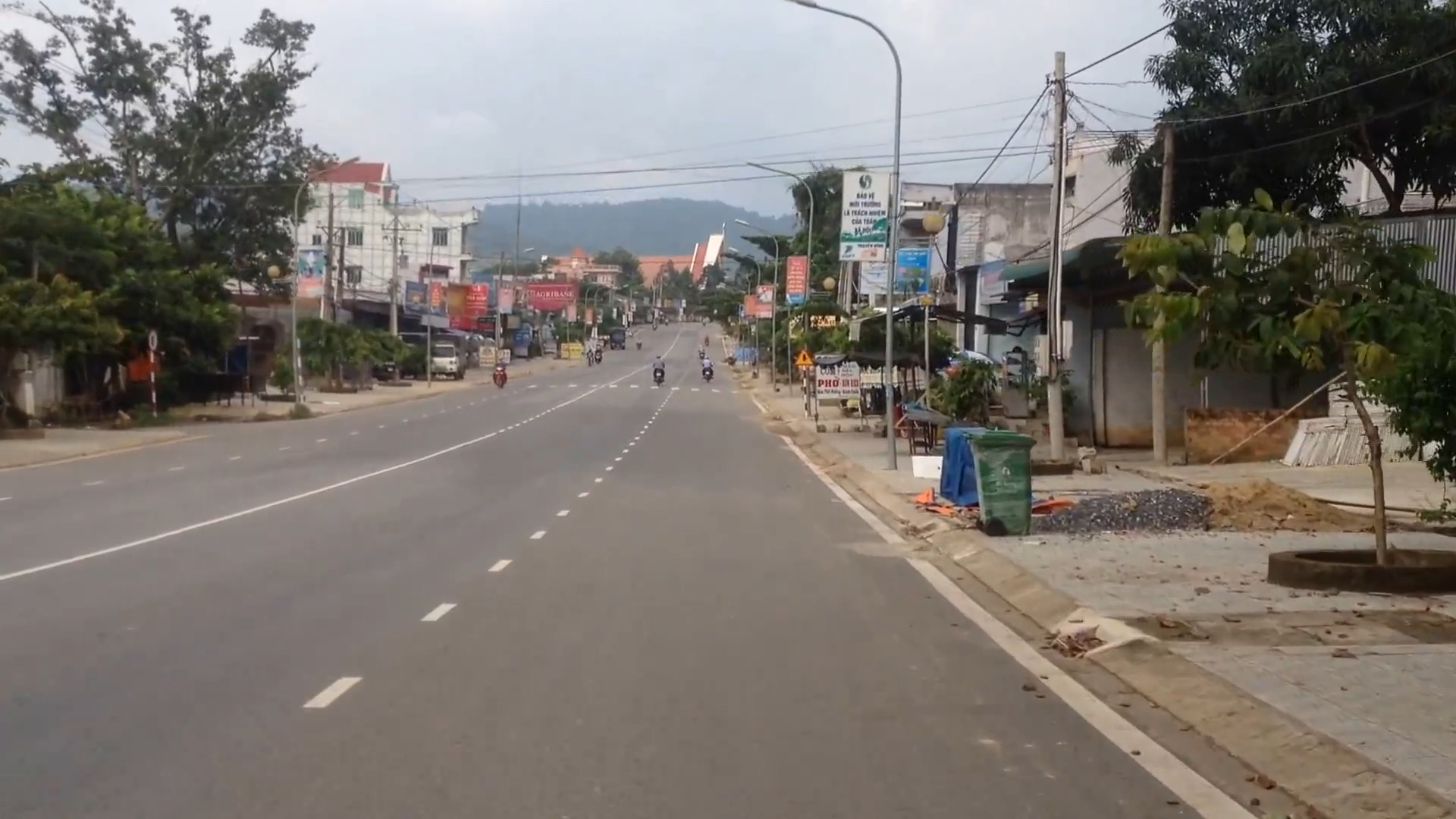
- View of Ma Da Guoi

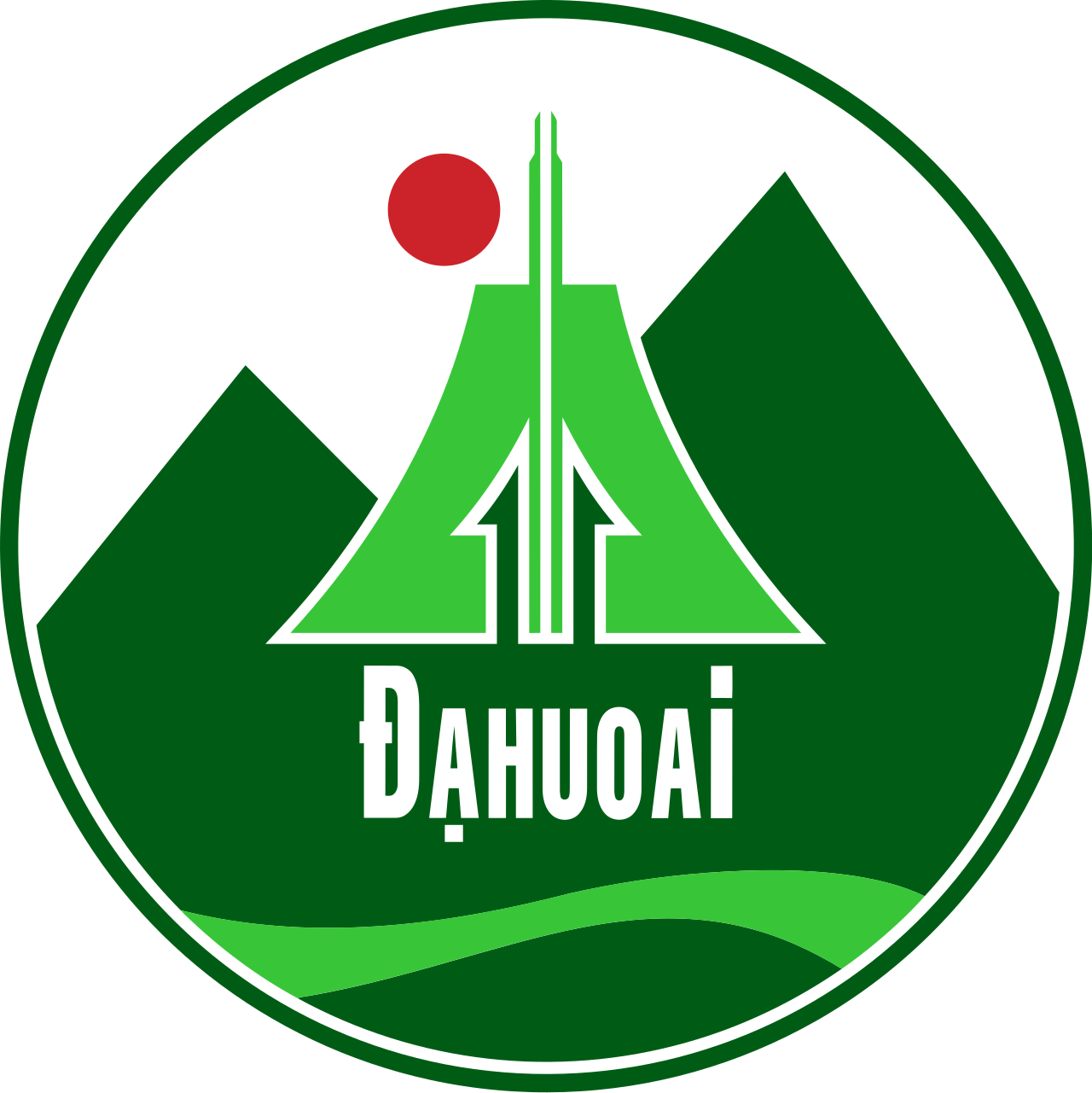
- Seal

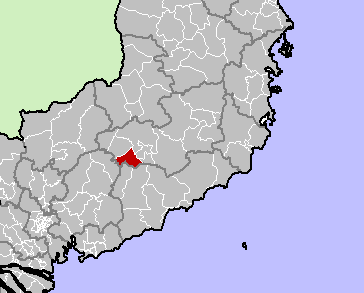
- Location in Lâm Đồng province
- Country: Vietnam
- Region: Central Highlands
- Province: Lâm Đồng province
- Capital: Ma Đa Guôi

Area
  - Total: 190 sq mi (490 km^{2})

Population (2018)
  - Total: 166,350
- Time zone: UTC+7 (Indochina Time)

Đạ Huoai is a former rural district of Lâm Đồng province in the Central Highlands region of Vietnam. As of 2003 the district had a population of 34,039. The district covers an area of 490 km^{2}. The district capital lies at Ma Đa Guôi.

== Name ==
Its name Đạ Huoai (Daa-huoaai, "the stream of waiting") is related with the legend of Da Mbri, which means "river Mbri" or "hero Bri". After his death, Bri became a big river.

In addition, Mdaa-guih (now Ma Đa Guôi town) means "a place of pause", which refers to where Bri was still waiting for his lover.
