= Bảo Lộc =

Coordinates: 11°32′53″N 107°48′27″E

Bảo Lộc B'lao
- Provincial city (Class-3)
- Bảo Lộc City; Thành phố Bảo Lộc
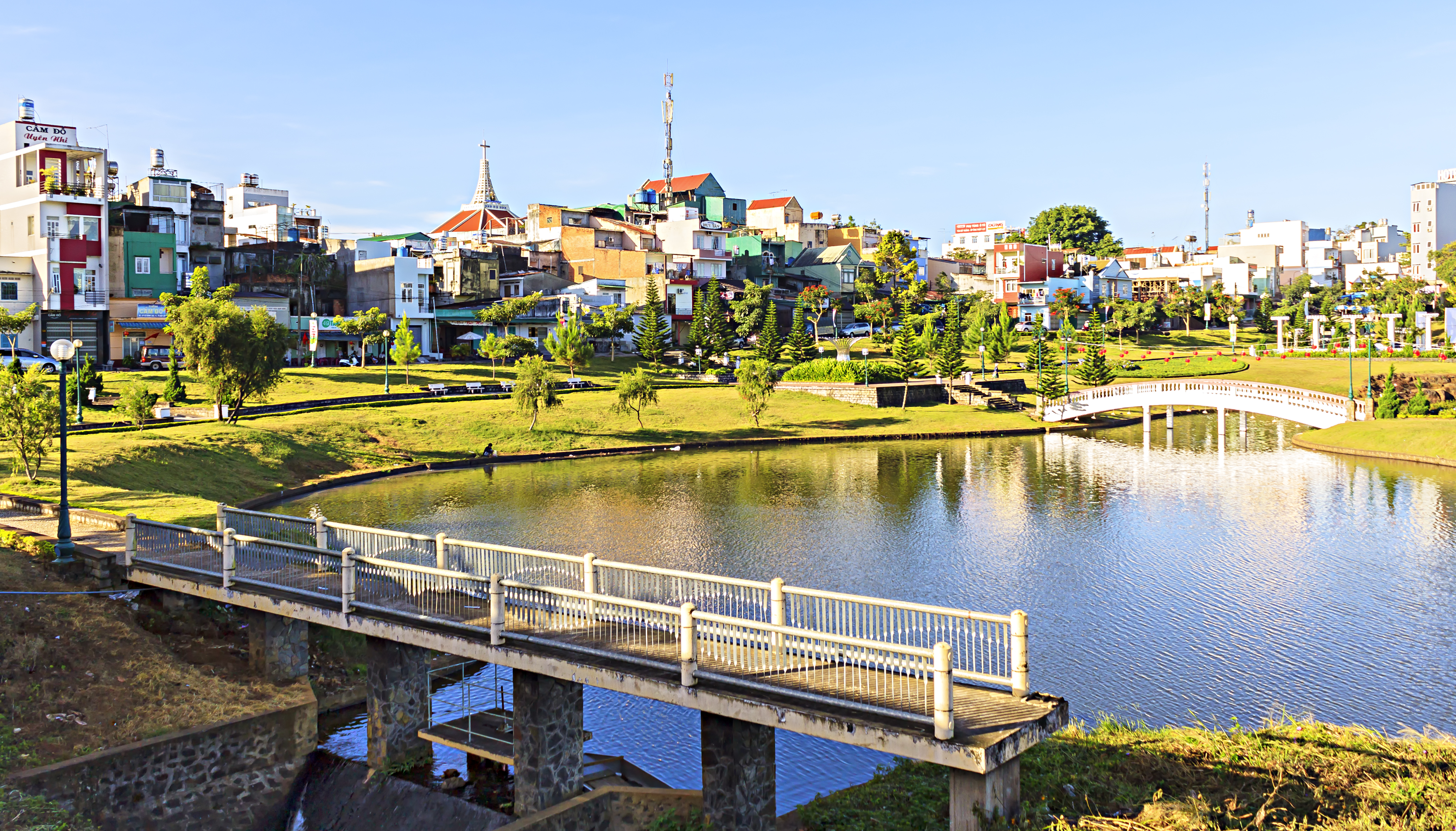
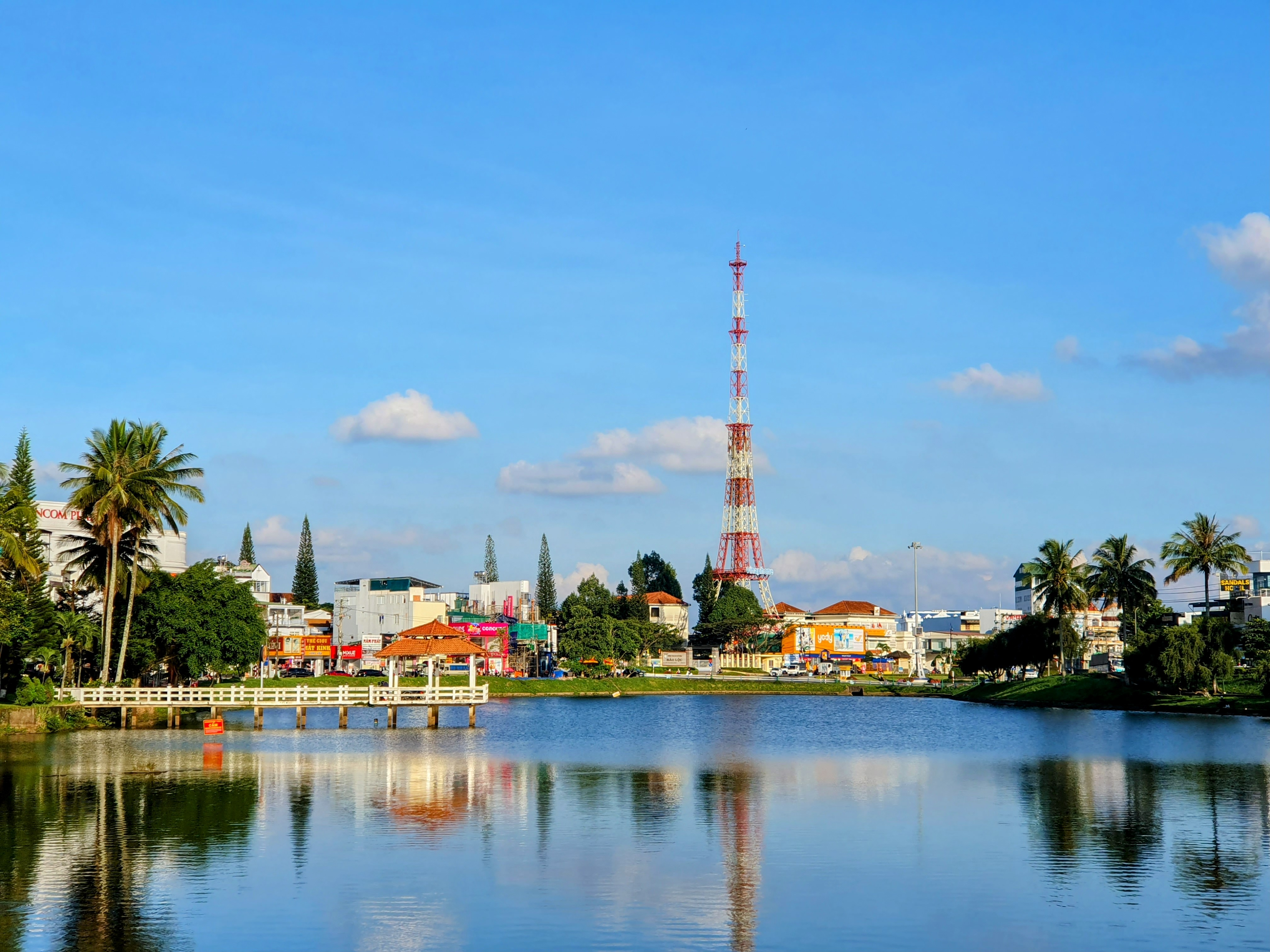
- Bảo Lộc Park Đồng Nai Lake, also known as Bảo Lộc Lake in the city centre

- Seal
- Interactive map of Bảo Lộc
- Country: Vietnam
- Province: Lâm Đồng
- Founded: July 11, 1994: established Bảo Lộc town; April 8, 2010: Bảo Lộc city was established

Government
  - Chairman of the People's Committee: Nguyễn Văn Phương
  - Chairman of the People's Council: Nghiêm Xuân Đức
  - Secretary: Tôn Thiện Đồng
  - Chairman of the Fatherland Front: Nguyễn Văn Khắc
  - Chief Justice of the People's Court: Nguyễn Khắc Quảng
  - Director of the People's Procuracy: Đặng Văn Đông

Area
  - Total: 233.56 km^{2} (90.18 sq mi)

Population (2018)
  - Total: 170,920
  - Density: 639.8/km^{2} (1,657/sq mi)
  - Ethnicities: Mạ; Kinh; Chinese; K'ho; Stieng; Nùng; Tày; Mnong
- Climate: Am
- Website: baoloc.lamdong.gov.vn

Bảo Lộc (old name in Ma language: B’Lao) is a city of Lâm Đồng Province in the Central Highlands region of Vietnam. Bảo Lộc is famous for its registered trademark: B'lao tea. As of 2018 the city had a population of 170,920. The city covers an area of 229 km^{2}. The central wards of the city are I, II and B'lao, which was the Bảo Lộc district capital town.

== Name ==
Its name is Bảo Lộc from B'lao in K'ho language, what means [the land of] mu oil trees.

== Subdivisions ==
Bảo Lộc has six urban wards and five communes.

The wards are:

- Ward I - 4.3144 km^{2}
- Ward II - 6.6215 km^{2}
- B’Lao Ward - 5.4029 km^{2}
- Lộc Phát Ward- 25.7302 km^{2}
- Lộc Tiến Ward - 13.0119 km^{2}
- Lộc Sơn Ward - 12.3669 km^{2}

The communes are:

- Lộc Thanh - 20.8098 km^{2}
- Đam B’ri - 32.201 km^{2}
- Lộc Nga - 16.0319 km^{2}
- Đại Lào - 59.2579 km^{2}
- Lộc Châu - 36.1955 km^{2}

== Transport ==
Air travel is provided by Lien Khuong International Airport in Da Lat which is approximately 81 km (50 mi) east of the city.

== Climate ==
Climate data for Bảo Lộc, elevation 850 m (2,790 ft)
Month	Jan	Feb	Mar	Apr	May	Jun	Jul	Aug	Sep	Oct	Nov	Dec	Year
Record high °C (°F)	31.8 (89.2)	33.8 (92.8)	34.0 (93.2)	33.2 (91.8)	33.0 (91.4)	33.2 (91.8)	30.6 (87.1)	31.2 (88.2)	31.3 (88.3)	31.0 (87.8)	32.2 (90.0)	31.8 (89.2)	34.0 (93.2)
Mean daily maximum °C (°F)	27.3 (81.1)	28.8 (83.8)	29.7 (85.5)	29.7 (85.5)	28.9 (84.0)	27.3 (81.1)	26.7 (80.1)	26.3 (79.3)	26.7 (80.1)	27.1 (80.8)	27.0 (80.6)	26.7 (80.1)	27.7 (81.9)
Daily mean °C (°F)	20.0 (68.0)	21.0 (69.8)	22.2 (72.0)	23.0 (73.4)	23.3 (73.9)	22.6 (72.7)	22.2 (72.0)	22.1 (71.8)	22.0 (71.6)	21.9 (71.4)	21.2 (70.2)	20.2 (68.4)	21.8 (71.2)
Mean daily minimum °C (°F)	15.2 (59.4)	15.8 (60.4)	17.4 (63.3)	19.1 (66.4)	20.1 (68.2)	20.0 (68.0)	19.7 (67.5)	19.7 (67.5)	19.7 (67.5)	19.0 (66.2)	17.8 (64.0)	16.1 (61.0)	18.3 (64.9)
Record low °C (°F)	5.0 (41.0)	4.5 (40.1)	8.0 (46.4)	12.0 (53.6)	10.4 (50.7)	15.8 (60.4)	15.3 (59.5)	14.5 (58.1)	15.5 (59.9)	13.5 (56.3)	8.9 (48.0)	8.1 (46.6)	4.5 (40.1)
Average rainfall mm (inches)	62.3 (2.45)	53.0 (2.09)	116.7 (4.59)	210.9 (8.30)	244.9 (9.64)	311.3 (12.26)	389.8 (15.35)	457.7 (18.02)	403.6 (15.89)	342.2 (13.47)	175.7 (6.92)	83.5 (3.29)	2,858.2 (112.53)
Average rainy days	5.9	5.4	9.3	14.9	20.1	22.2	25.5	26.3	25.5	23.8	15.6	7.9	202.3
Average relative humidity (%)	79.9	78.2	79.3	83.0	86.8	89.3	90.1	90.8	90.5	89.0	86.3	83.4	85.5
Mean monthly sunshine hours	213.0	214.5	225.0	199.5	177.9	145.1	137.1	122.9	117.8	139.1	159.6	184.5	2,037.6
Source: Vietnam Institute for Building Science and Technology

== Local sights ==
Older buildings in Bảo Lộc include the Bát Nhã Temple. Hồ Đồng Nai lake is a small lake situated in the central part of the town.
