= Lâm Đồng province =

Province of Vietnam

Lâm Đồng
- Province
- Tỉnh Lâm Đồng 省林同
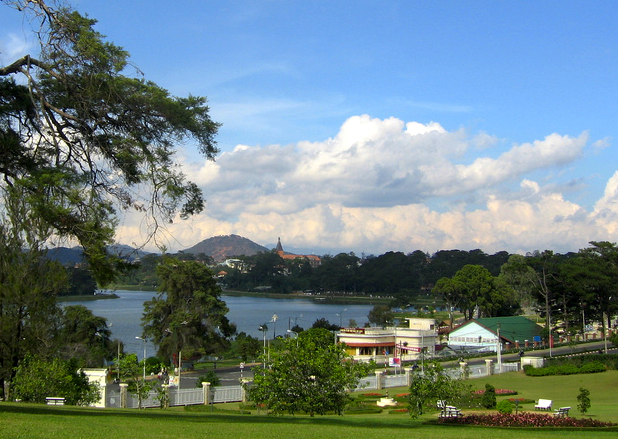
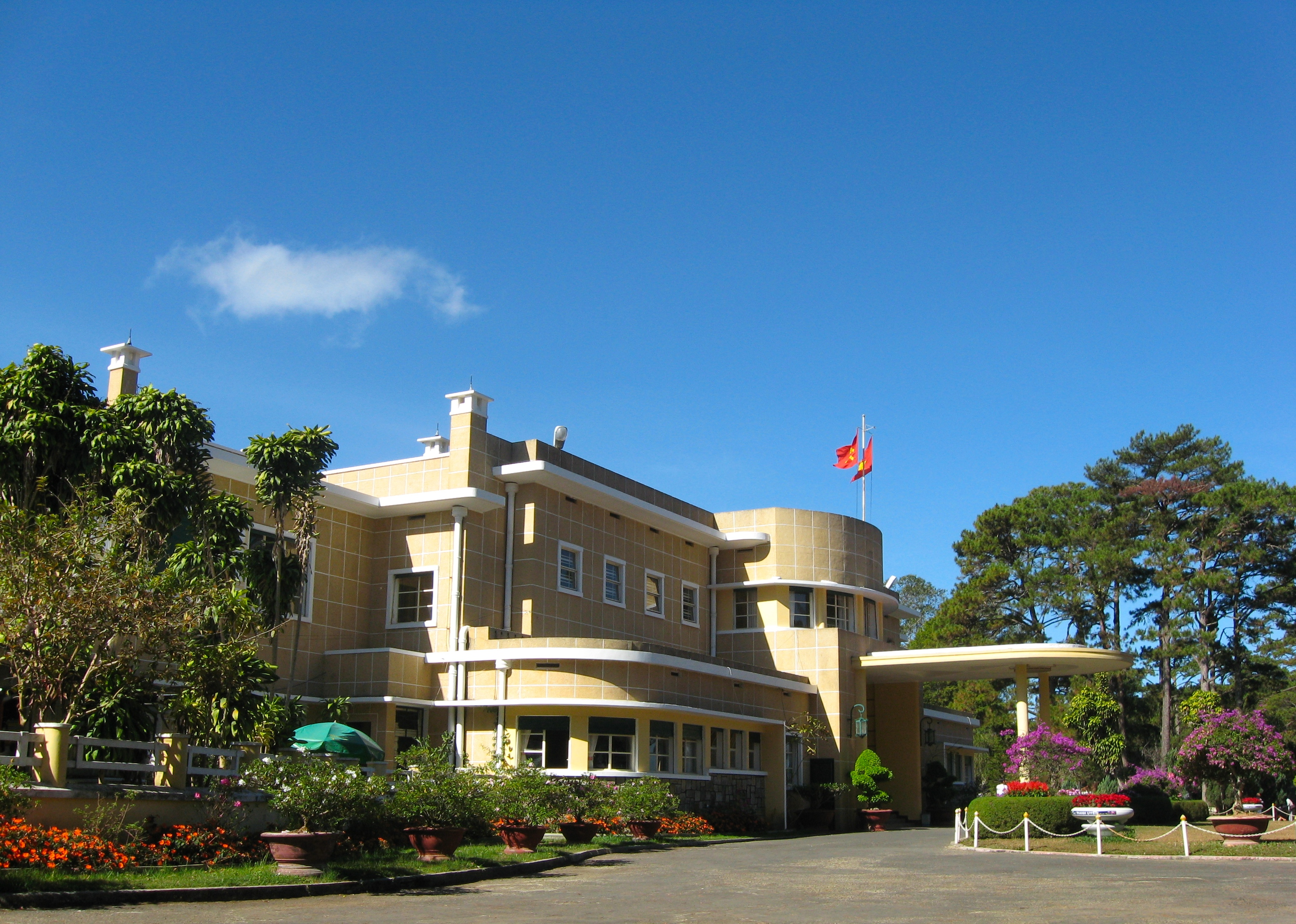
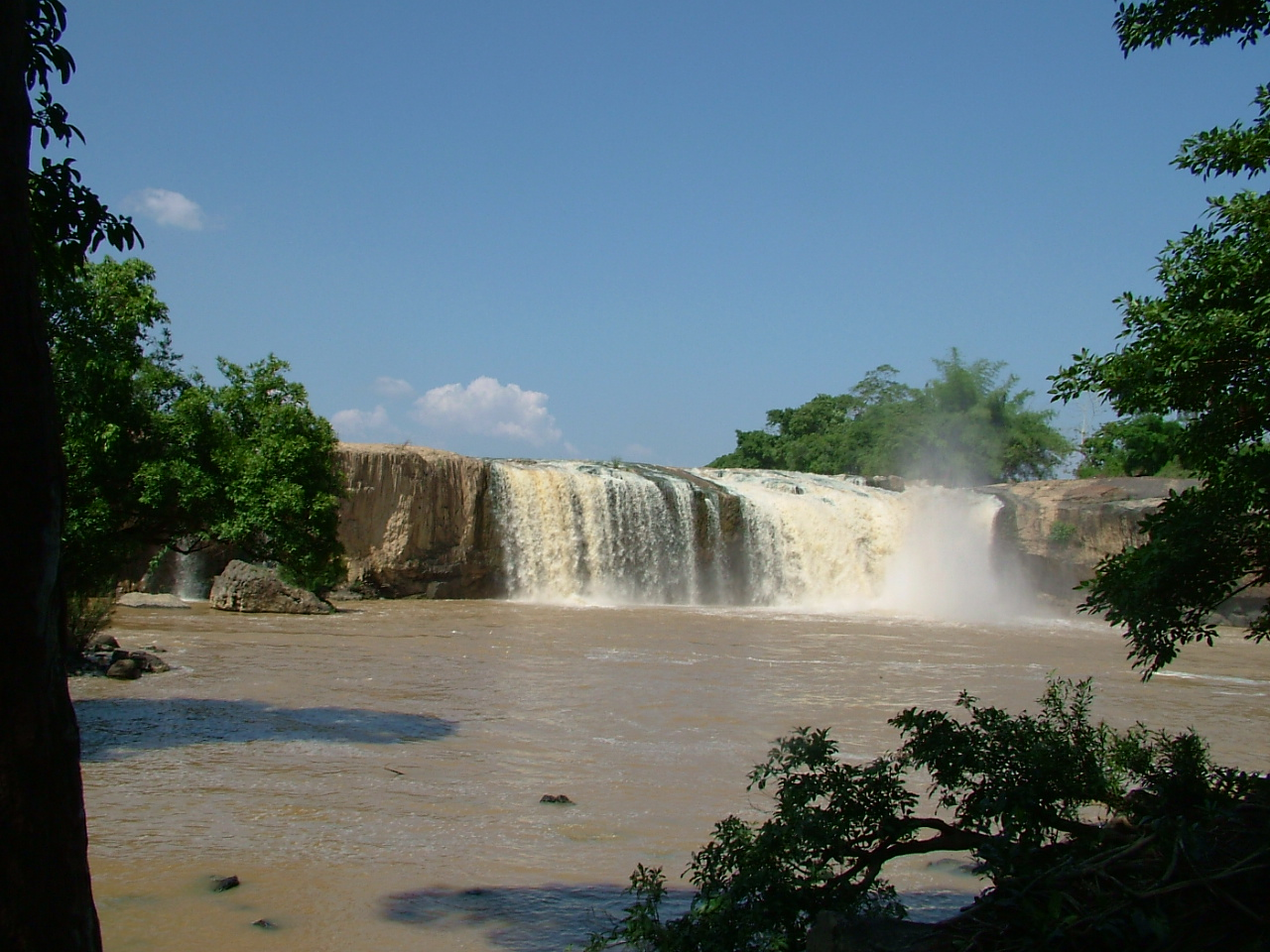
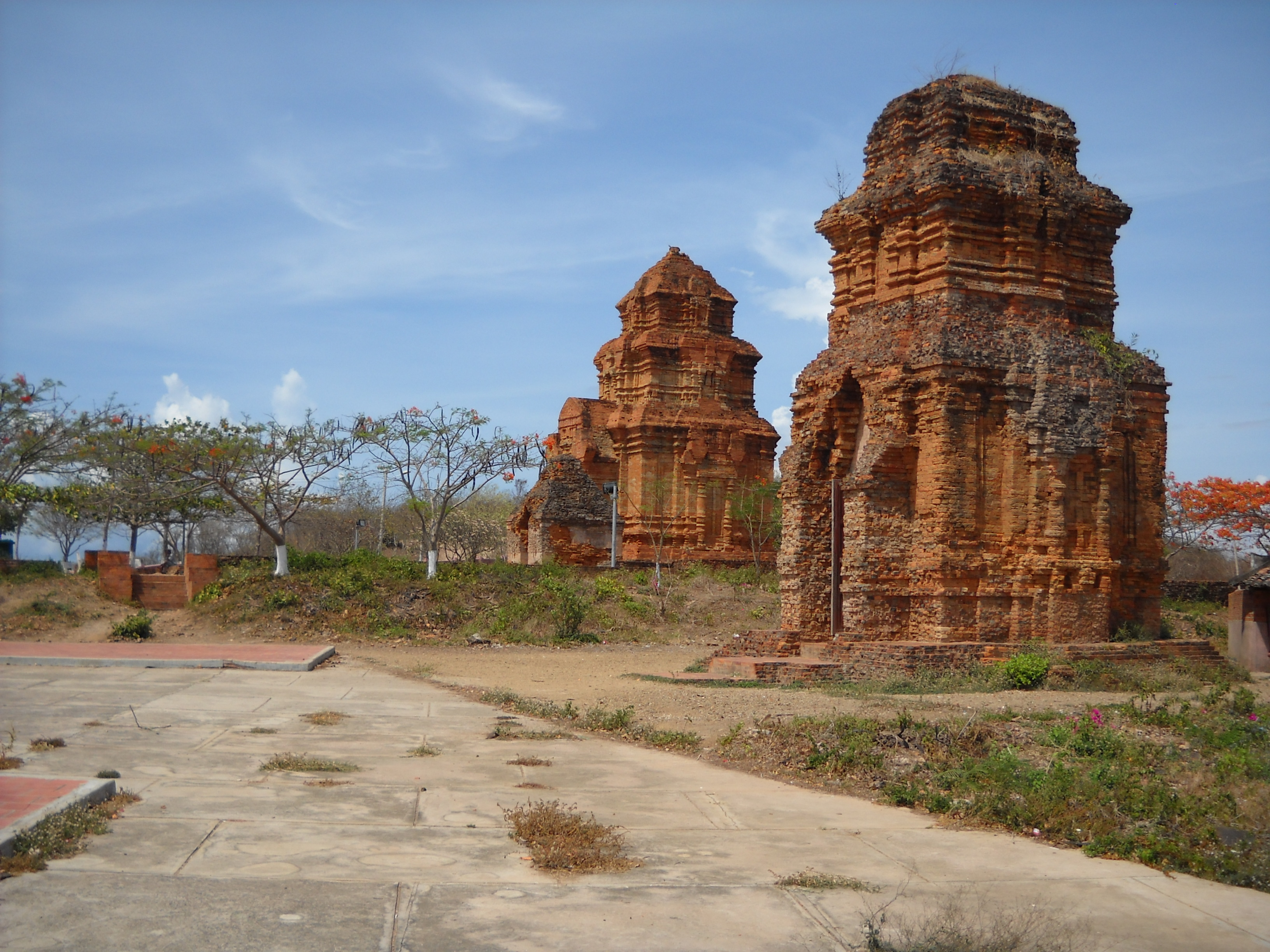
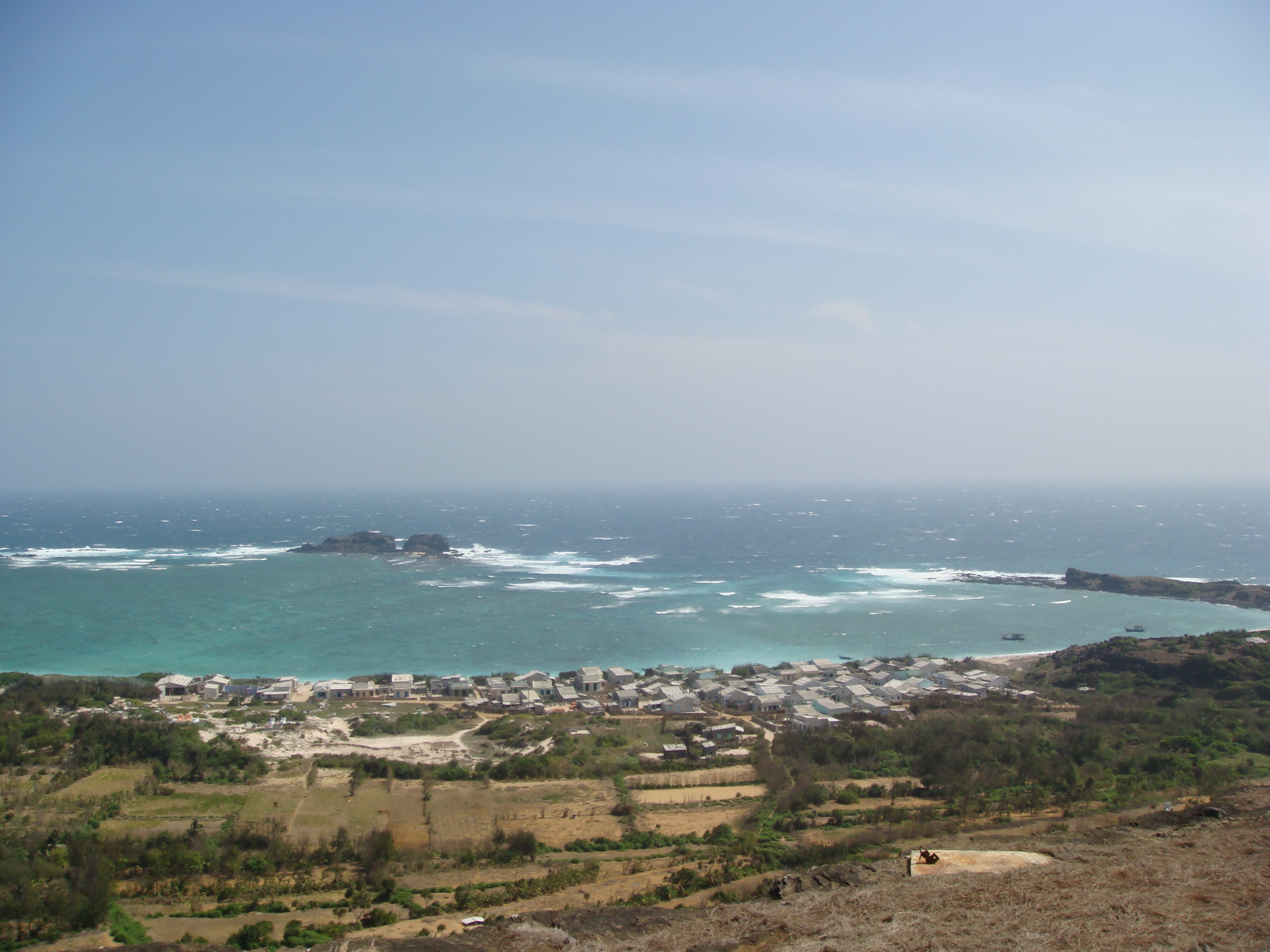
- Xuân Hương Lake Dinh III Đray Sáp Falls Po Sah Inư Tower Phú Quý

- Interactive map of Lâm Đồng
- Coordinates: 11°57′N 108°26′E
- Country: Vietnam
- Region: Central Highlands
- Capital: Xuân Hương – Đà Lạt ward

Area
  - Total: 24,233.07 km^{2} (9,356.44 sq mi)

Population (2025)
  - Total: 3,872,999
  - Density: 159.8229/km^{2} (413.9394/sq mi)

Demographics
  - Ethnicities: Vietnamese, Cơ Ho, Mạ, Nùng

GDP
  - Total: VND 78.433 trillion US$ 3.406 billion
- Time zone: UTC+7 (ICT)
- Postal code: 66xxx
- Calling code: 63
- ISO 3166 code: VN-35
- HDI (2020): ▲0.715 (28th)
- Website: www.lamdong.gov.vn

Lâm Đồng is a province of Vietnam located in the south of the South Central Coast and Central Highlands. It borders Khánh Hòa to the east, Đồng Nai and Hồ Chí Minh City to the southwest, the South China Sea to the southeast, Đắk Lắk to the north, and Cambodia to the northwest.

The three highest plateaus of the Central Highlands: Lâm Viên, Di Linh, and Bảo Lộc (formerly known as B'Lao), are located in Lâm Đồng province at an elevation of 1,500 meters above sea level. The provincial capital, Xuân Hương – Đà Lạt Ward, is situated 300 km northeast of Ho Chi Minh City, 658 km south of Đà Nẵng, and 1,414 km from the capital, Hanoi, via National Route 1. In 2010, Lâm Đồng became the first province in the Central Highlands to have two provincial-level cities: Đà Lạt and Bảo Lộc.

The economy is based largely on agriculture, with tea, coffee and vegetables being the main agricultural products. Lâm Đồng attracted 8.65 million tourists in 2023.
