= Cát Tiên National Park =

National park in Vietnam

Cat Tien National Park
- IUCN category II (national park)
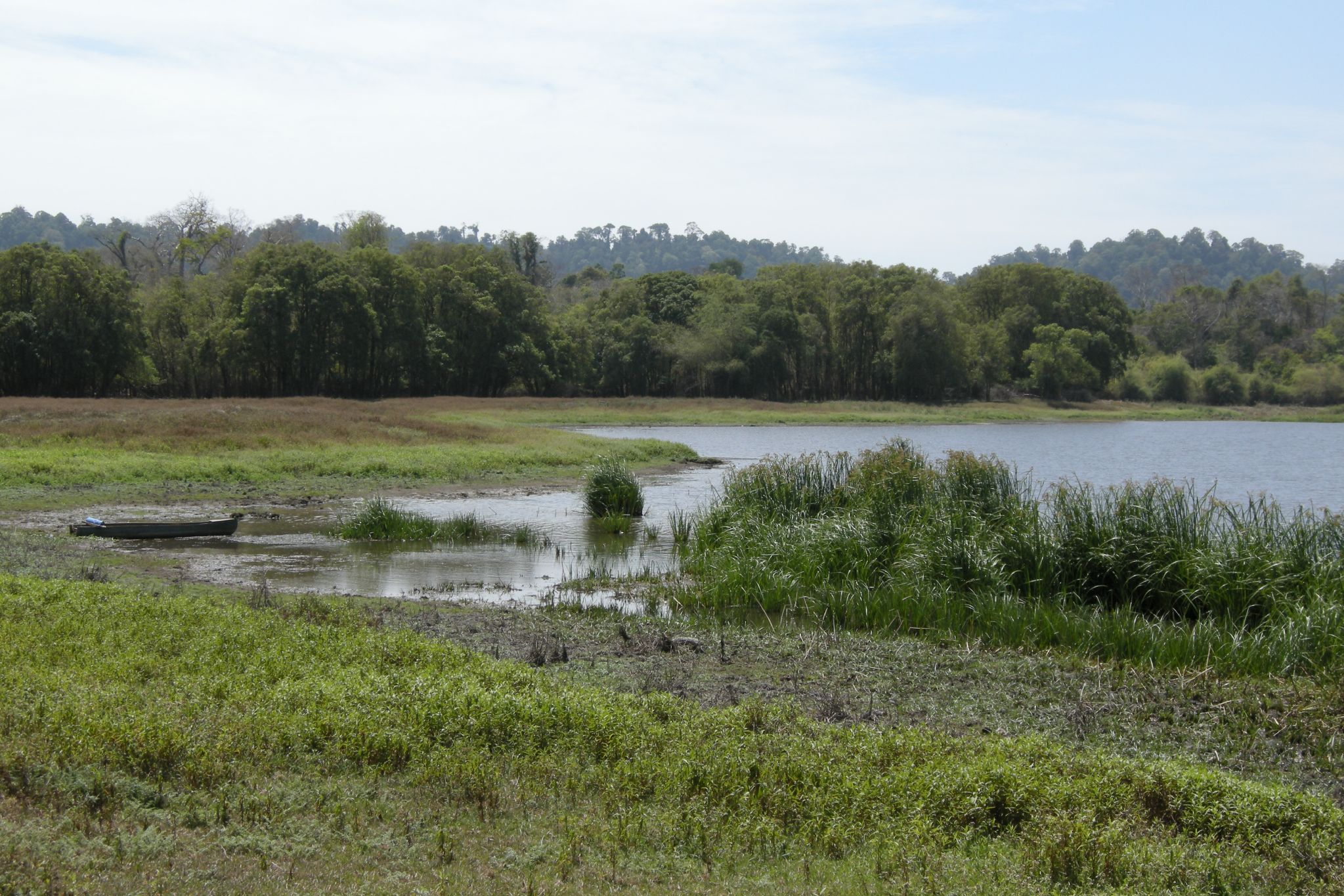
- Bàu Sấu (Crocodile Lake)

- Location within Vietnam
- Location: Việt Nam
- Nearest city: Biên Hòa, Long Khánh of Đồng Nai; Đồng Xoài of Bình Phước; Bảo Lộc of Lâm Đồng
- Coordinates: 11°30′N 107°20′E
- Area: 720 km^{2} (280 sq mi)
- Established: 1992 (present extent)
- Governing body: Ministry of Agriculture and Rural Development (MARD)

Ramsar Wetland
- Official name: Bau Sau Wetlands and Seasonal Floodplain
- Designated: 4 August 2005
- Reference no.: 1499

Cát Tiên National Park (Vietnamese: Vườn quốc gia Cát Tiên) is a national park located in the south of Vietnam, in Đồng Nai City, and Lâm Đồng Province. It is approximately 150 km north of Ho Chi Minh City. It has an area of about 720 km^{2} and protects one of the largest areas of lowland tropical forests left in Vietnam. Since 2011, Cát Tiên National Park has been a part of Đồng Nai Biosphere Reserve.

== History ==
The surrounding area was originally occupied by the Ma people – especially in the area that is now Cat Loc (in the 1960s eastern Nam Cat Tien was described as inhabité ['uninhabited']) – and Stieng people in western Dong Nai Province. After the formation of the park, many of these people were re-settled in Talai village, to the south-west of Nam Cat Tien.

Cát Tiên National Park (CTNP) was protected initially in 1978 as two sectors, Nam Cat Tien and Tay Cat Tien. Another sector, Cat Loc, was gazetted as a rhinoceros reserve in 1992 upon the discovery of a population of the Vietnamese Javan rhinoceros, an occasion that brought the park into the world's eye. The three areas were combined to form one park in 1998. Nam Cat Tien is contiguous with Vĩnh Cửu nature reserve thus providing an enlarged area for species to breed. The forest is now protected by the Kiểm lâm (VN Forest Rangers) with responsibilities for managing poaching, fire control, and other issues.

Parts of the park area suffered historically during the Vietnam War when it was extensively sprayed with defoliant herbicides. However, substantial further damage was done by logging up until the 1990s. To this day these areas have extensive bamboo and grassland cover and trees have not yet grown back.

== Archaeology ==
The Cát Tiên archaeological site is located just outside the park boundary on the northern bank of the Dong Nai river (between Cat Loc and Nam Cat Tien, facing towards the latter). Excavations carried out between 1994 and 2003 revealed a group of temples, belonging to a previously unknown Shaiva Hindu civilization which probably inhabited the area between the 4th century and 9th centuries AD (possibly later). A large number of gold, bronze, ceramic, coloured stone, and glass artefacts are currently displayed in the Da Lat museum.

== Habitats and flora ==
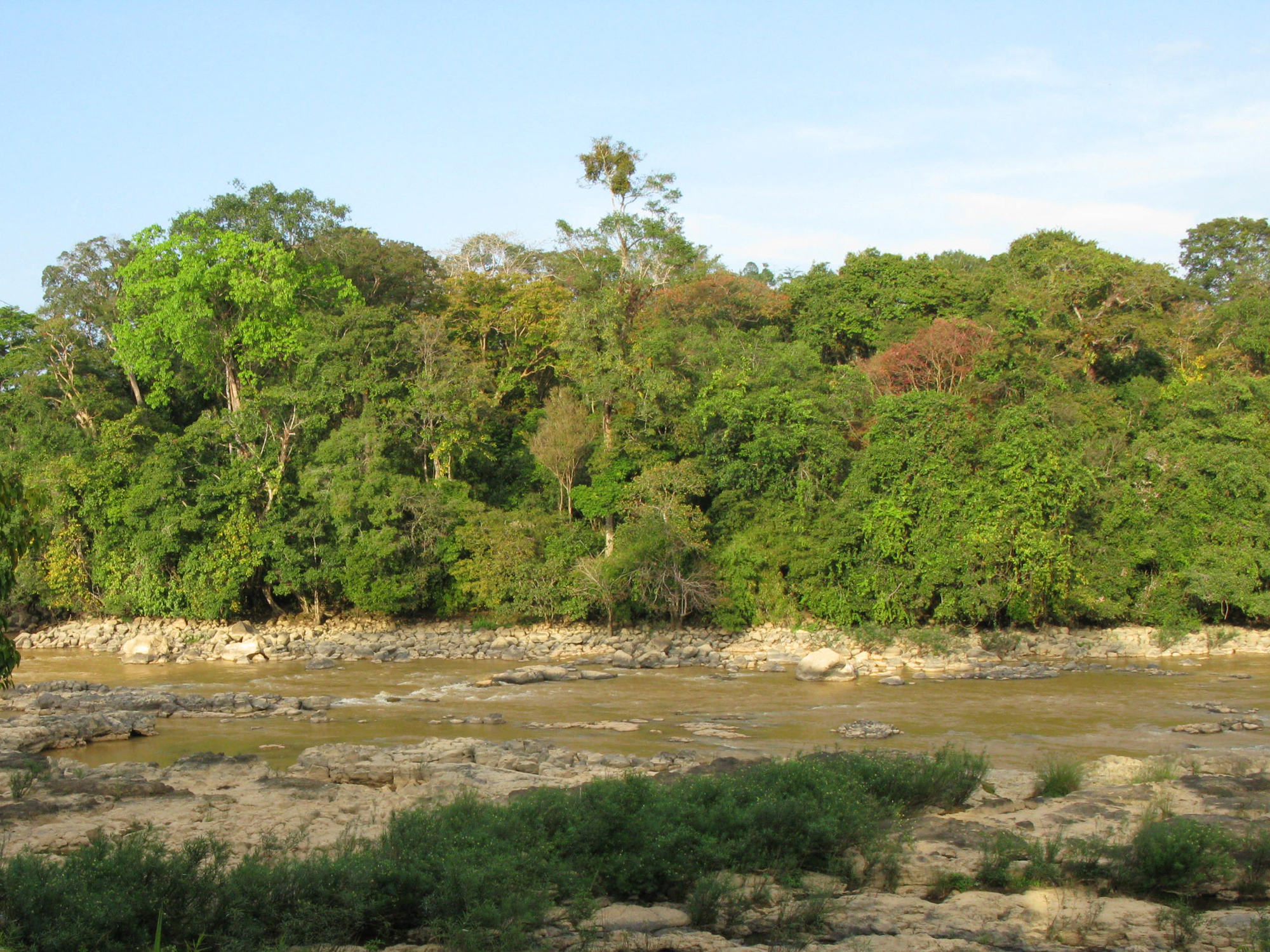
Trees next to Ben Cu rapids at the beginning of the dry season, showing forest structure

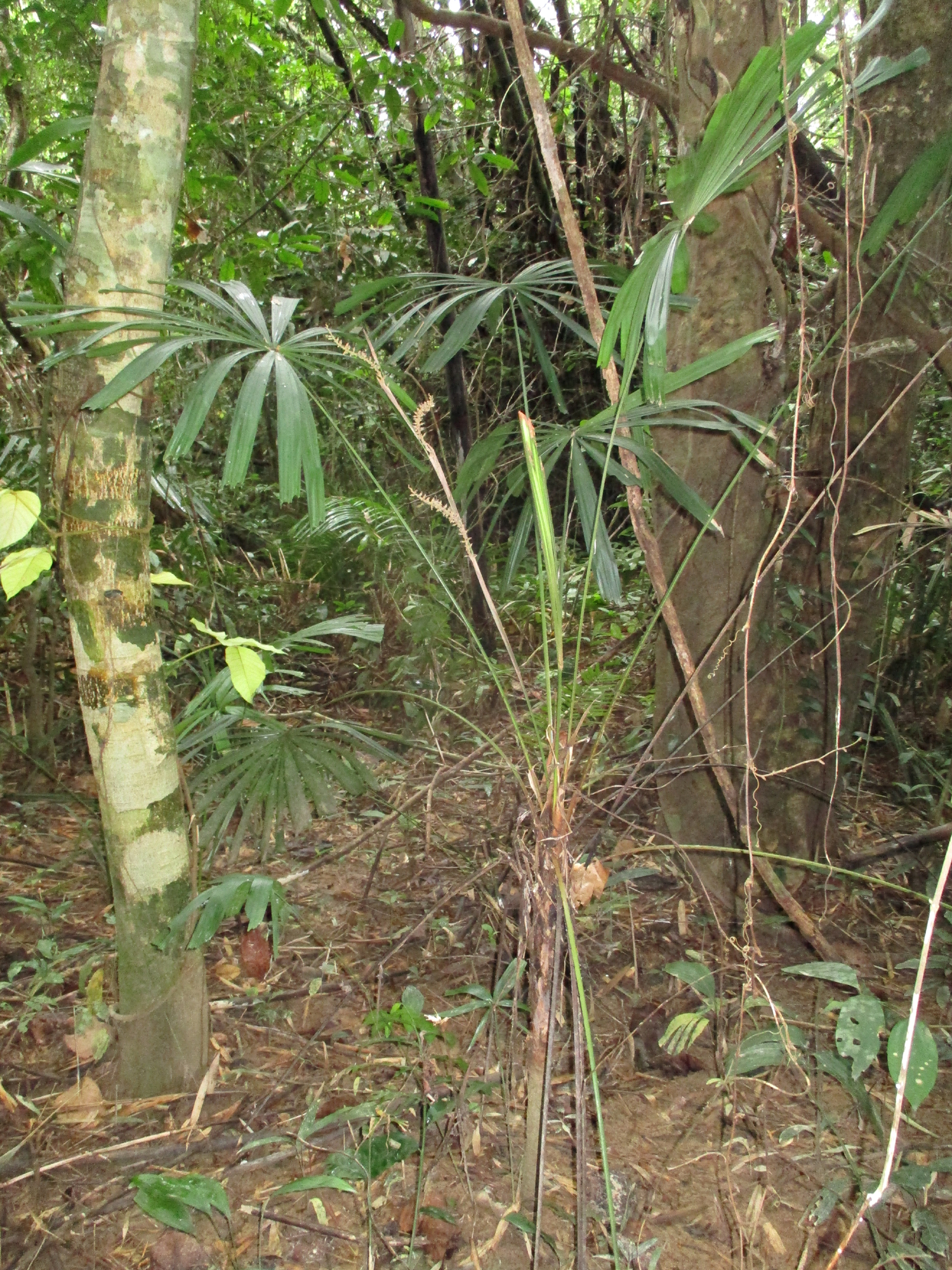
Licuala cattienensis

Cát Tiên National Park (CTNP) consists of seasonal tropical forests, grasslands and riparian areas, with Park Authorities identifying five major habitat types as follows:

1. Primary evergreen forest areas perhaps comprise only about 2% of the Nam Cat Tien area; can be highly diverse but are dominated by trees in two families (for other Families and Species see below):

- Fabaceae: Afzelia xylocarpa (Caesalpinoidea) and rosewoods (Papilionoideae): including the endemic Dalbergia mammosa.
- Dipterocarpaceae: notably Dipterocarpus alatus, which occurs naturally, but with a good survival rate, it is widely used for replanting; Hopea odorata is also used for replanting.

2. Primary and secondary mixed or deciduous forest (dry season): Where soils are well-drained the following trees are common:

- Lagerstroemia calyculata (Lythraceae),
- Tetrameles nudiflora (Tetramelaceae), of there are spectacularly large specimen trees,
- Anogeissus acuminata (Combretaceae).

The abundance L. calyculata is discussed by Blanc et al. especially as an indicator of secondary forest. "It appears to be a very good competitive species able to regenerate on denuded areas: along roads and on land abandoned after cultivation. Human disturbances have mostly affected Dipterocarpaceae for resin and Fabaceae for their wood."

The low canopy and under-story zones contains species such as the endemic Cycas inermis; a number of palms are common, including Caryota mitis, Licuala and Pinanga spp., together with a wide range of fruit species (important food for animals) such as figs (e.g. Ficus racemosa) and wild bananas (Musa acuminata).

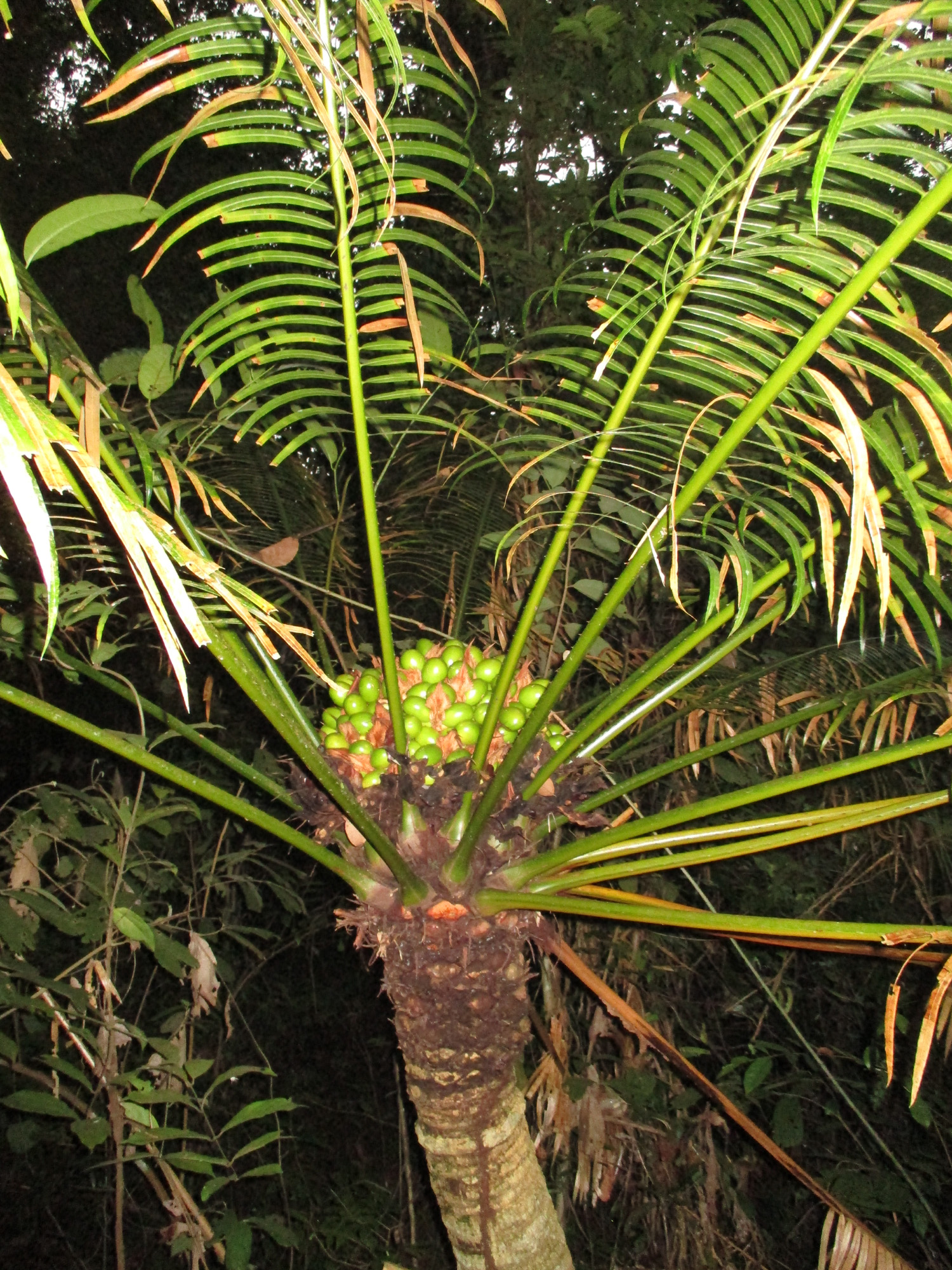
Cycas inermis with megaspores

3. Secondary forest with abundant bamboo species: this due to human activity, the forest having been degraded by logging, forest fires and in some areas war-time defoliants, which have caused the forest canopy to be replaced with bamboos. Common trees include Lagerstroemia calyculata, Mesua sp. and Xylia xylocarpa, with bamboo species present.

4. Bamboo forest (some 40% of the park area) may also have been affected by human activity, including areas where forest was previously cleared for subsistence agriculture creating favourable conditions for bamboos; species include: Bambusa balcooa, B. procera, and Gigantochloa spp.

5. Seasonally flooded grasslands: CTNP has substantial (approximately 10%) area of grassland (including disused farmland) and wetlands

- In the rainy season, Dong Nai river water floods into an area of 2,500 ha area of northern Nam Cat Tien, along the Da Kluo which is a reverse flow stream (like Tonlé Sap) replenishing the lakes: Bau Sau (crocodile lake), Bau Chim, Bau Co and the surrounding grasslands.
- In the flat eastern half of Nam Cat Tien especially, there are a number of swamps (see above) surrounding isolated, poorly-drained small open areas – typically 3–10 ha – that might best be described as wet meadows – that are often surrounded with swamp forest and may also contain vernal pools.

=== Lianas and epiphytes ===
As in most seasonal tropical forests the park has an abundance of epiphytes (such as ferns, orchids and 'ant plants' such as Myrmecodia). Lianas are abundant and include: Ancistrocladus tectorius, box beans: Entada spp., 'monkey ladders': Lasiobema scandens and Rattans: especially Calamus spp. in wet areas.

=== Riparian areas ===
In flat lowland areas and especially along streams, areas of freshwater swamp forest notable tree species often include: Ficus benjamina, Livistona saribus, Crateva, Syzygium and Horsfieldia spp. Naturally occurring patches of Bambusa blumeana (tre gai or tre la ngà) are also abundant in riparian areas and flooding forest. Other plants include Schumannianthus dichotomus ("cool mat") which occurs in muddy areas along streams.

=== Scientific and conservation activities ===
Numerous endemic species, having their type locality at CTNP, have been described by Vietnamese and international scientists: including those at the Vietnam-Russia Tropical Centre. More than 20 species of organisms have the name "catienensis" or similar, including two palms (Licuala illustrated here), the bracket fungus Tomophagus cattienensis, two reptiles and four insects to date.

Between the park headquarters and Ta Lai village there are substantial replanting areas, including a 200 ha area supported by European Community between 1996 and 1998.

== Fauna ==
=== Mammals ===
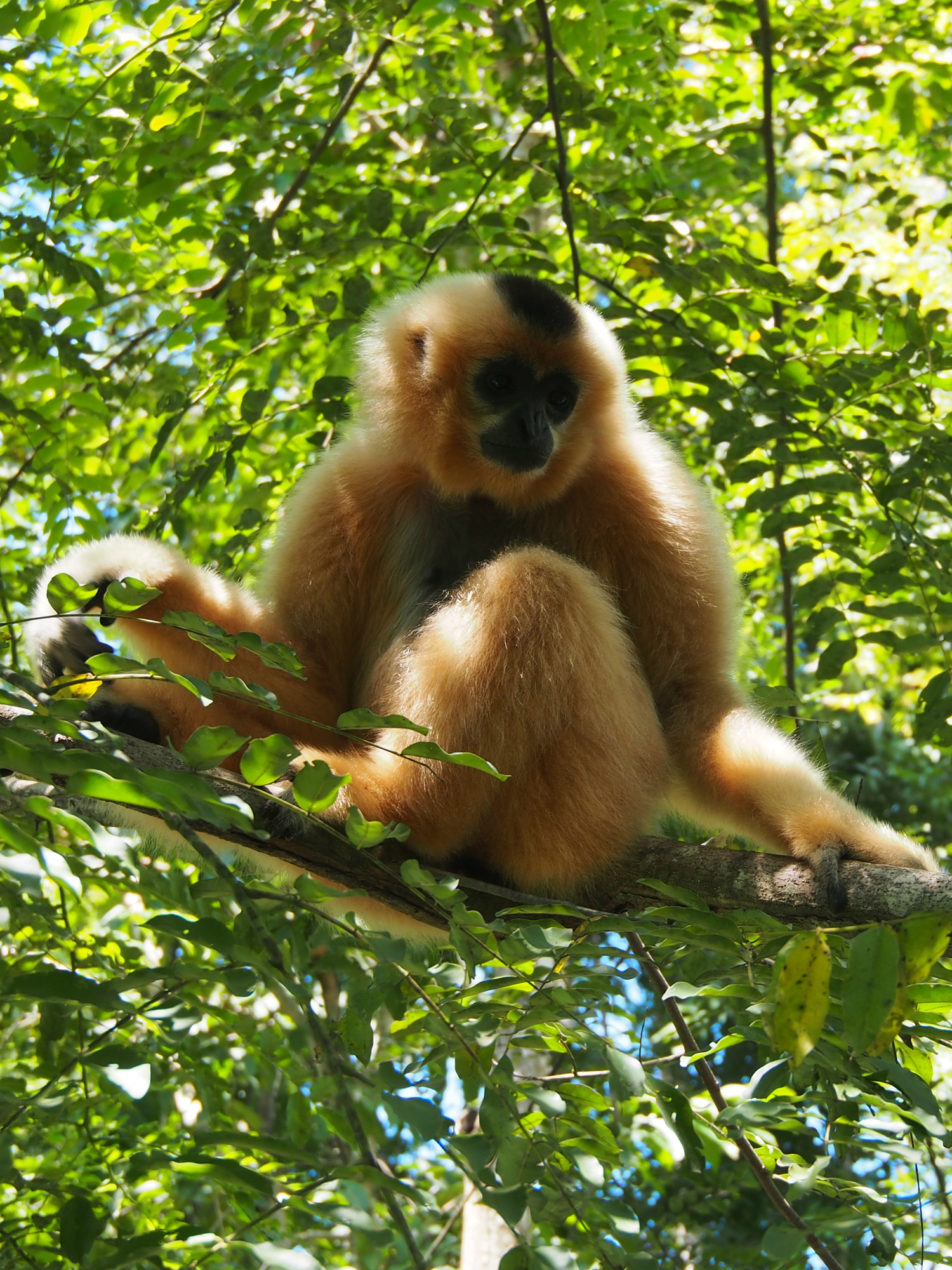
Golden-cheeked gibbon female in the park

The park hosts many mammal species; the following may be encountered:

Primates include the endemic golden-cheeked gibbon Nomascus gabriellae

- black-shanked douc langurs Pygathrix nigripes
- Indochinese lutung (silvered langur) Trachypithecus germaini
- stump-tailed macaque (=bear macaque) Macaca arctoides
- crab-eating macaque (=long-tailed macaque) Macaca fascicularis
- northern pig-tailed macaque Macaca leonina
- pygmy slow loris Nycticebus pygmaeus

Scandentia ("tree shrews", family Tupaiidae: more related to primates than shrews):

- Dendrogale murina - Northern smooth-tailed treeshrew
- Tupaia belangeri - Northern treeshrew

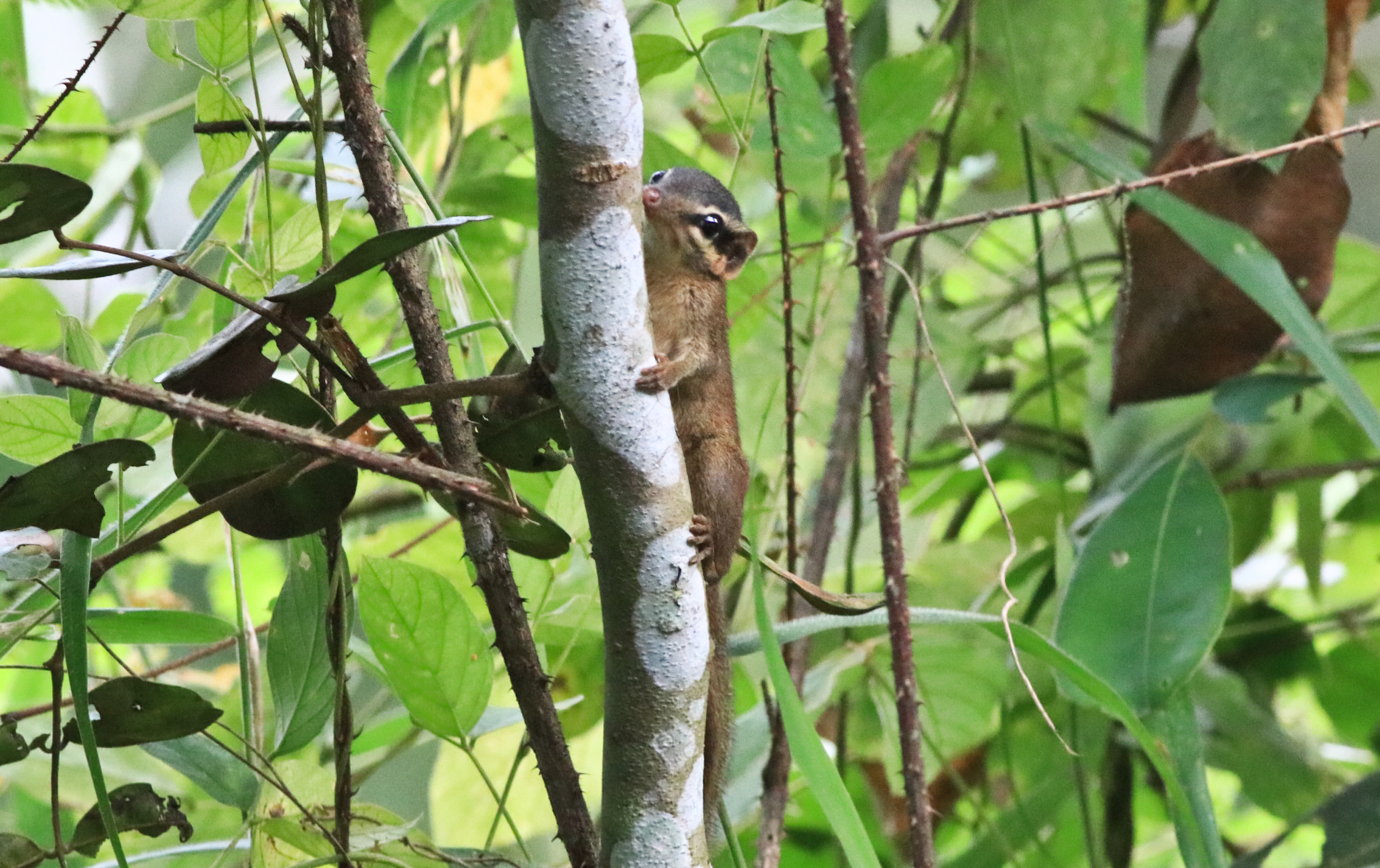
Northern smooth-tailed treeshrew

Carnivores:

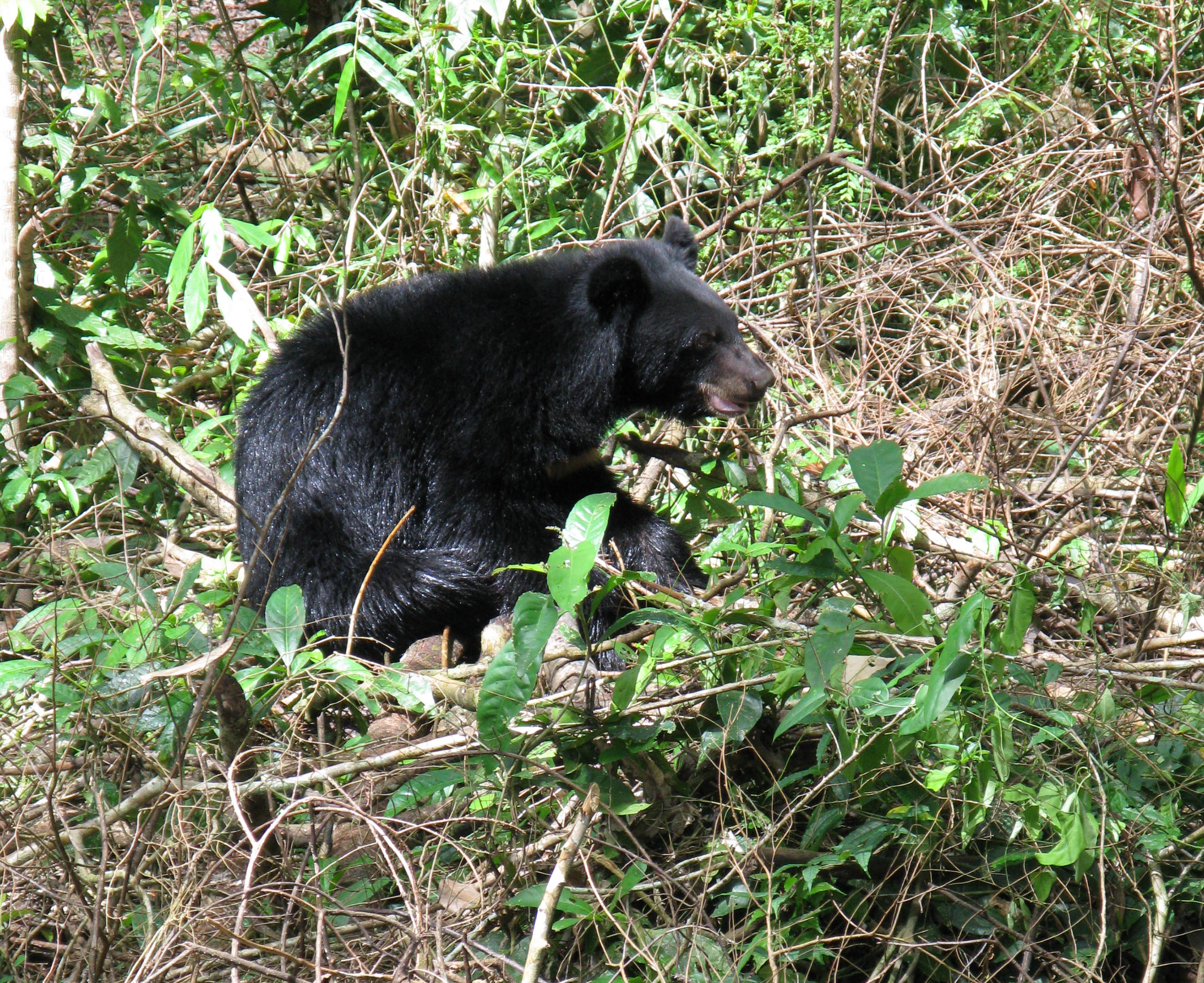
Asian black bear in the park's Bear Rescue Centre

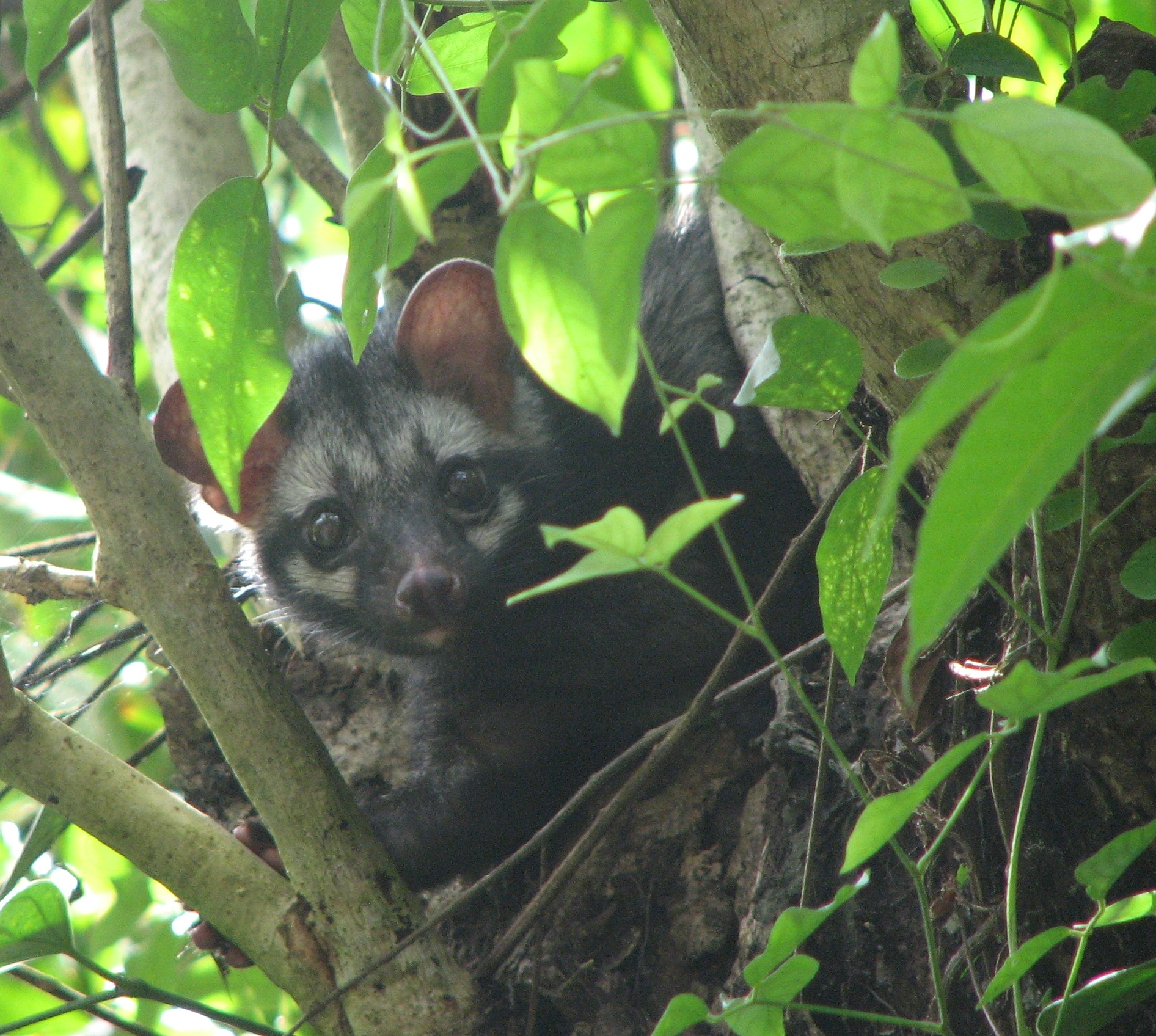
Asian palm civets are very common

- sun bear Helarctos malayanus
- asiatic black bear Ursus thibetanus (in the bear sanctuary: but wild status is debated)
- Large-toothed Ferret Badger Melogale personata pierrei
- Yellow-throated Marten Martes flavigula subsp. indochinensis
- oriental small-clawed otter Aonyx cinerea
- crab-eating mongoose Herpestes urva
- binturong Arctictis binturong
- large Indian civet Viverra zibetha
- Asian Palm Civet Paradoxurus hermaphroditus
- small-toothed palm civet Arctogalidia trivirgata
- leopard cat Prionailurus bengalensis

Bats (confirmed records):

- fruit bats Pteropodidae 4 spp.
- false vampire bats Megadermatidae 2 spp.
- horseshoe bats Rhinolophidae 5 spp.
- leaf-nosed bats Hipposideridae 3 spp.
- evening bats Vespertilionidae 12 spp.

Rodents and Lagomorphs - the park list includes:

- squirrels Sciuridae 5 spp.
- mice & rats Muridae 14 spp.
- porcupines Hystricidae:
  - east Asian porcupine Hystrix brachyura
  - brush-tailed porcupine Atherurus macrourus
- the Siamese hare Lepus peguensis (Lagomorpha: Leporidae)

Other notable mammal species, including some that are vulnerable or endangered, include:

- Sunda flying lemur (colugo) Galeopterus variegatus
- Asian elephant Elephas maximus (Proboscidea) - EN
- Sunda pangolin Manis javanica (Pholidota) - CR
- gaur Bos gaurus (Artiodactyla) - VU

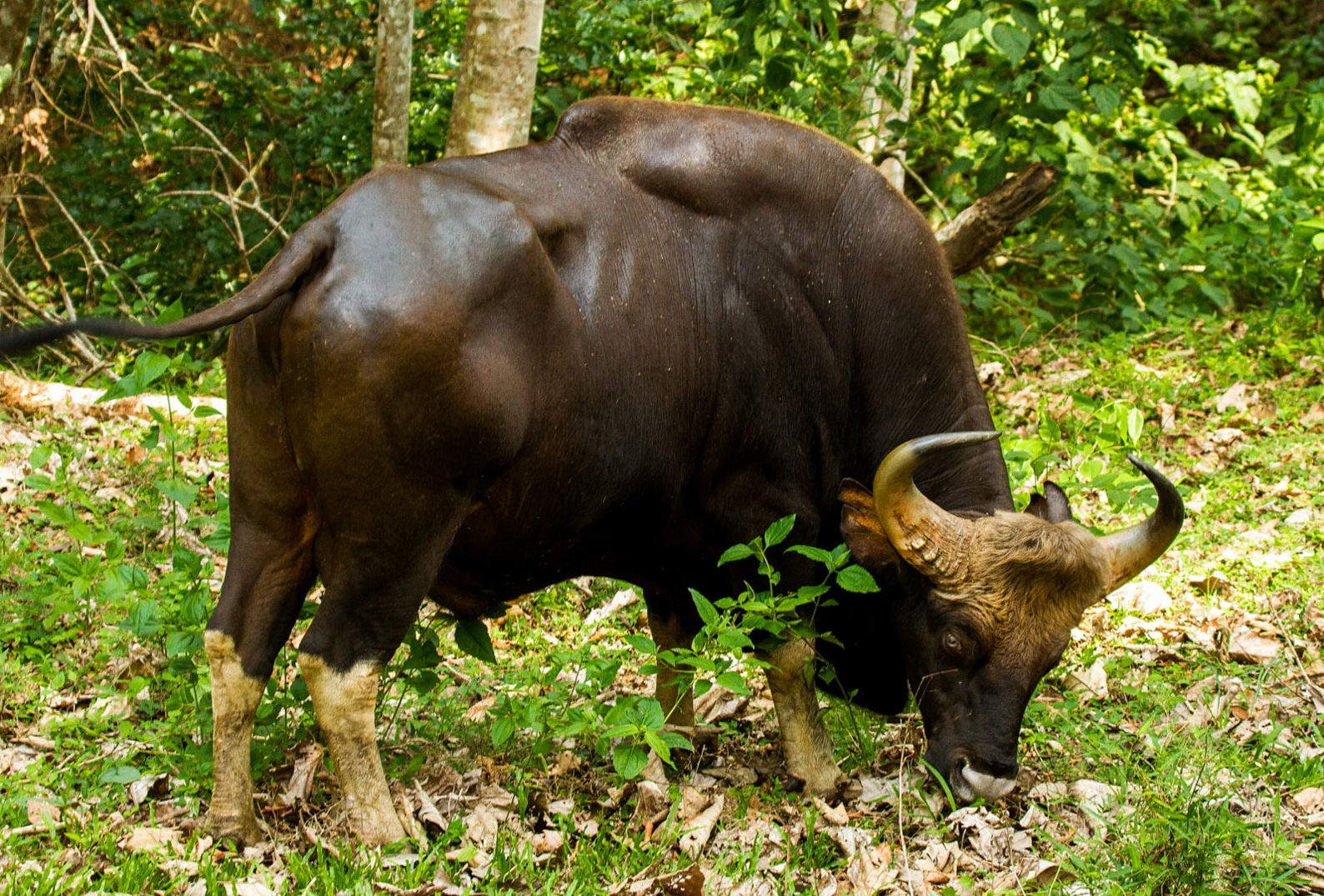
Gaur bull

Besides the gaur, recently confirmed even-toed ungulate records include:

- Eurasian wild boar Sus scrofa
- lesser mouse-deer Tragulus kanchil
- barking deer (= red muntjac) Muntiacus muntjak annamensis
- sambar deer Rusa (=Cervus) unicolor

The park fauna included the Javan rhinoceros, and was one of only two populations in the world, until poachers shot and killed the last rhino in Cát Loc in 2010. There are also records of banteng and kouprey, but the latter may now be globally extinct, and wild Asian water buffalo no longer occur in Cat Tien. Some accounts also list Indochinese tigers, leopards, clouded leopards and dholes; however, a recent series of surveys did not confirm this.

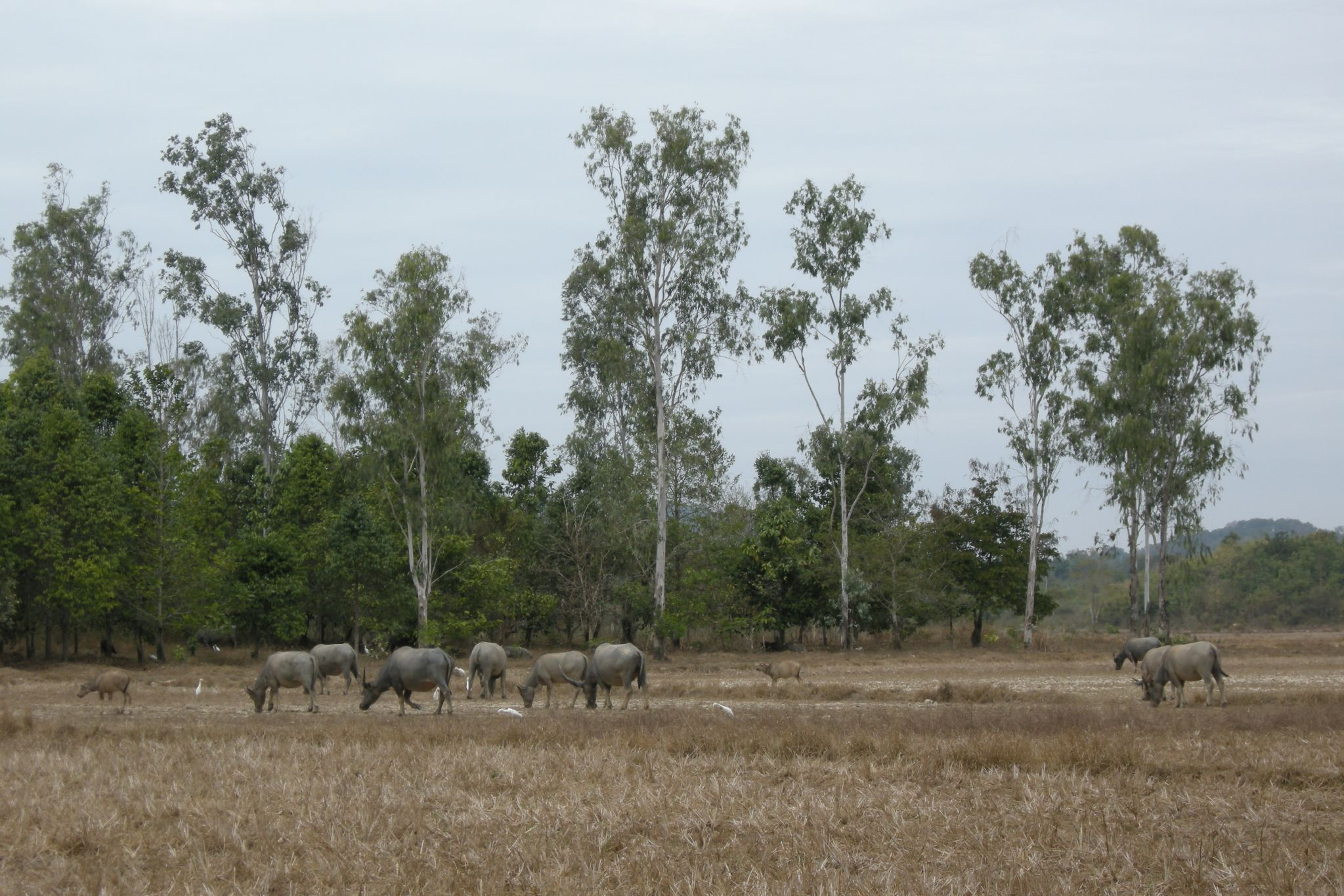
Asian water buffaloes in Cát Tiên National Park

=== Birds ===
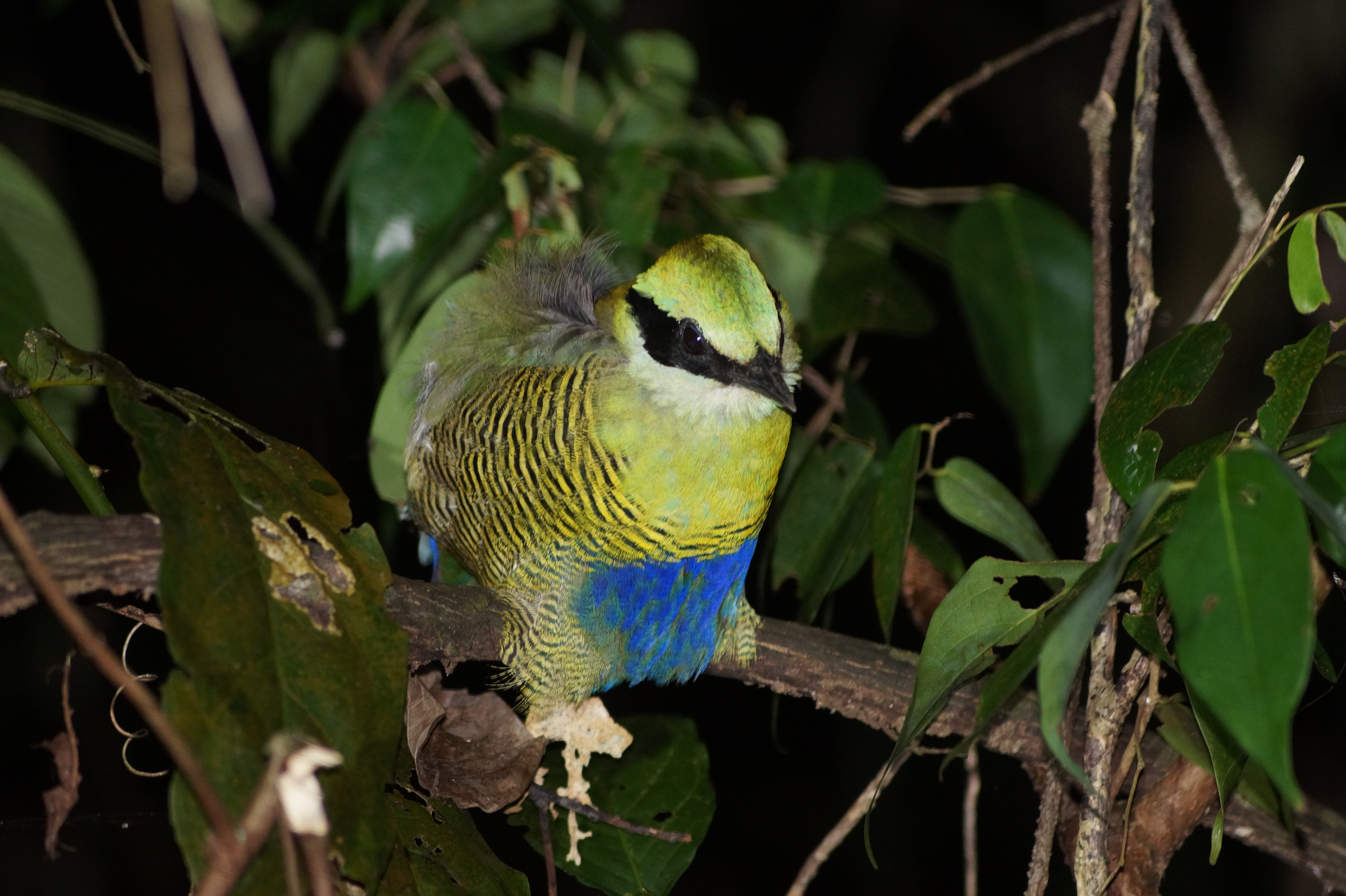
Bar-bellied pitta

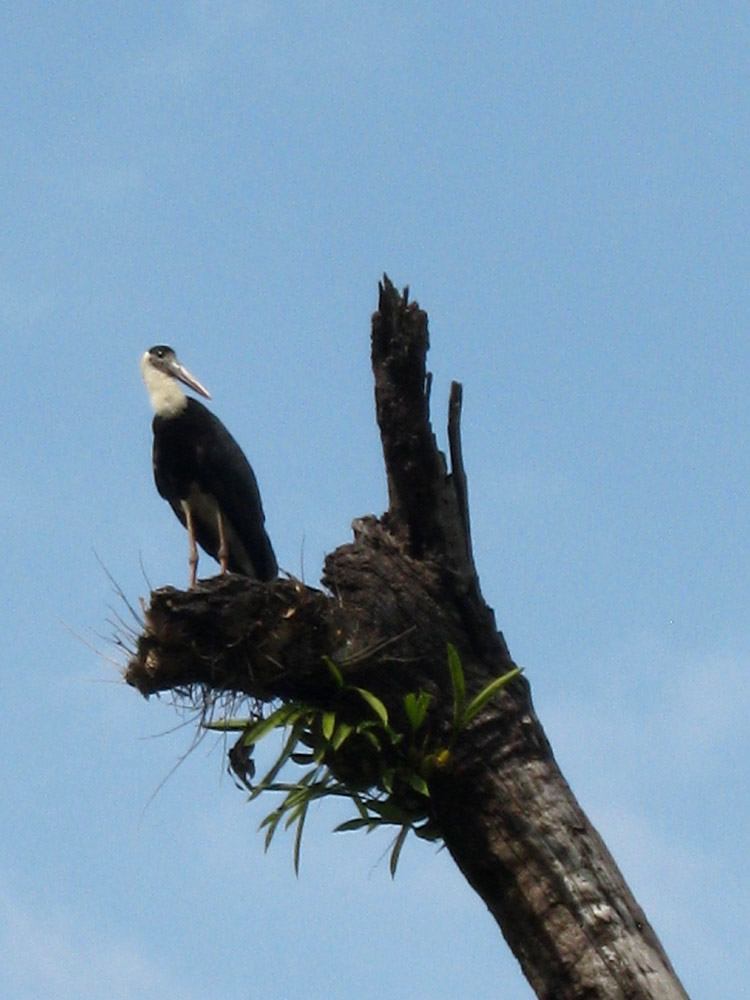
Woolly-necked stork

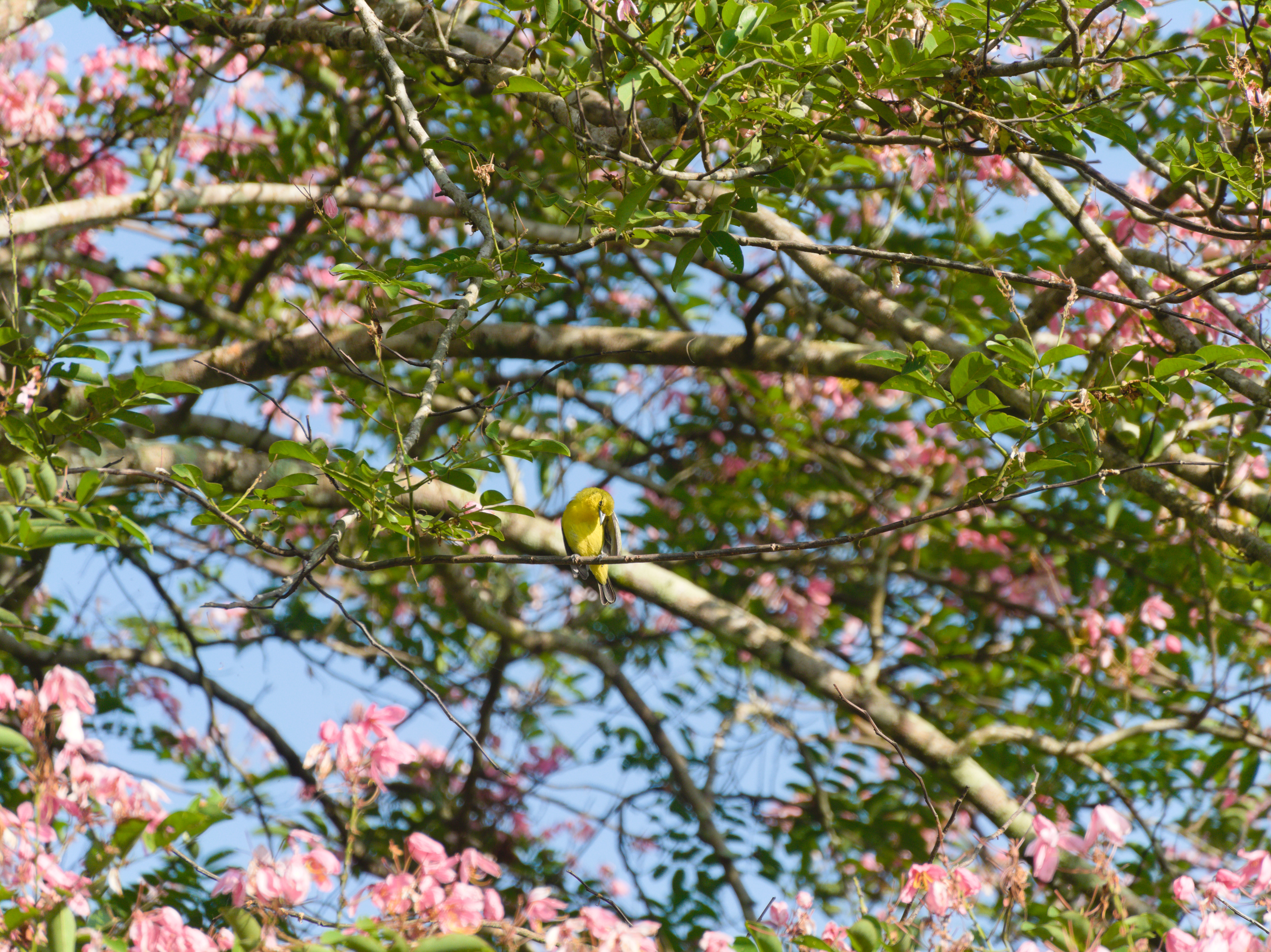
A Common Iora preening its feathers on a blooming Cassia javanica

The park has an impressive list of bird species including:

- Red junglefowl
- Green peafowl
- Pheasants Phasianidae: include Germain's peacock-pheasant,
  - Siamese firebacks (although found elsewhere, these are especially easy to see in the park)'
  - Orange-necked partridge;
- Kingfishers: include tree kingfishers: Halcyon (4) spp
  - Smaller - Alcedinidae: 3 spp. including the blue-eared kingfisher Alcedo meninting
- Pied kingfisher - Cerylidae: Ceryle rudis
- Bee-eaters Meropidae
- Hornbills: Great, Oriental pied and the Wreathed hornbill
- Pittas: Bar-bellied, blue rumped, blue-winged pitta
- Broadbills: including the black and red, dusky and banded species
- Endemic sub-species of the red-vented barbet
- Grey-faced tit babbler
- Woodpeckers: including:
  - pale-headed, white-bellied woodpecker,
  - black-and-buff, Heart-spotted woodpecker,
  - great slaty woodpecker Mulleripicus pulverulentus
- Asian fairy-bluebird
- Lesser adjutant birds, various herons and egret species
- Milky stork and the woolly-necked stork have also been reported in recent years
- a wide variety of resident and migratory waterfowl; although recorded, white-winged ducks may no longer be present in the park
- Birds of prey including osprey, lesser fish eagle, grey-headed fish eagle, crested serpent eagle, collared and other falconets.

=== Reptiles ===
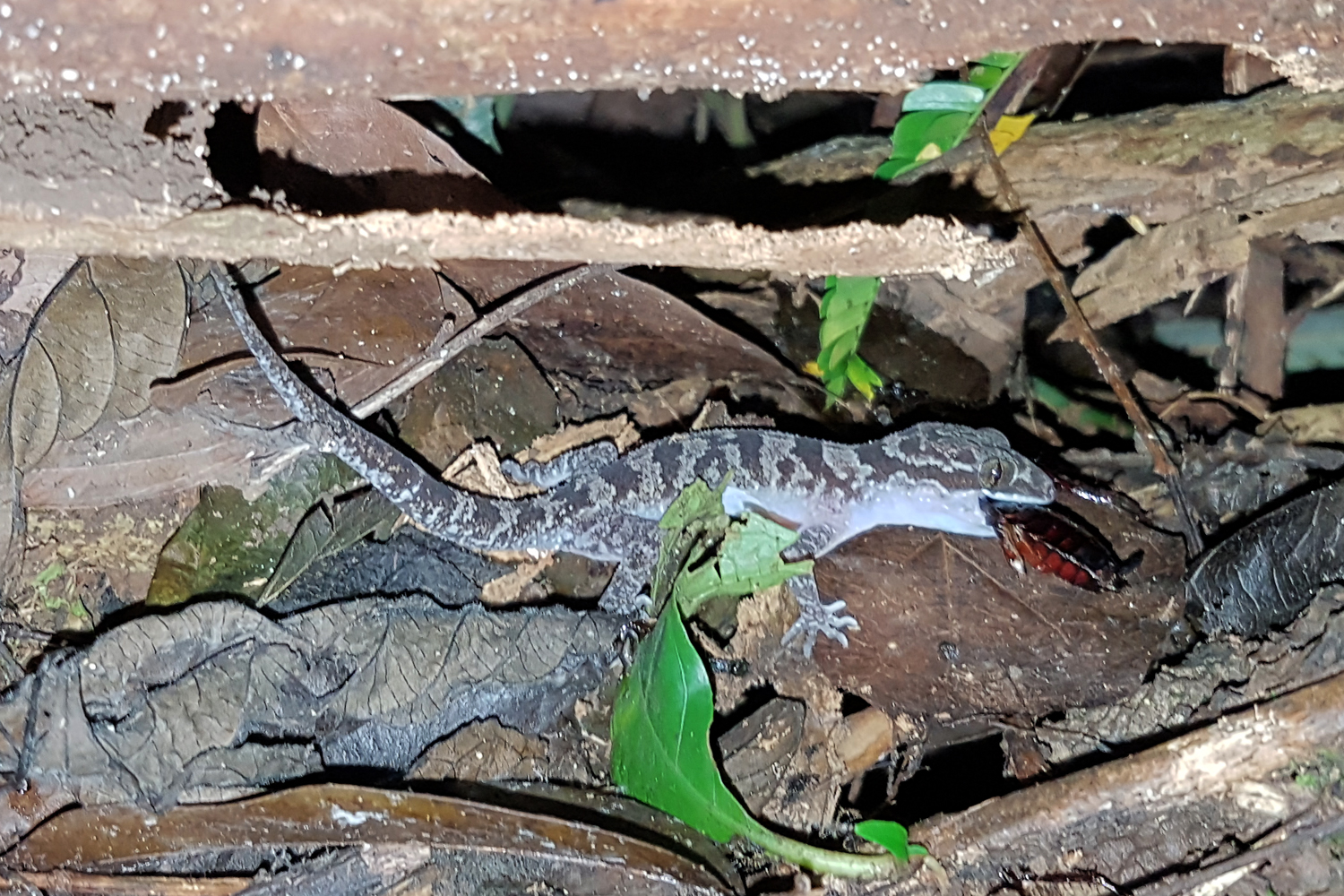
Cat Tien bent-toed gecko

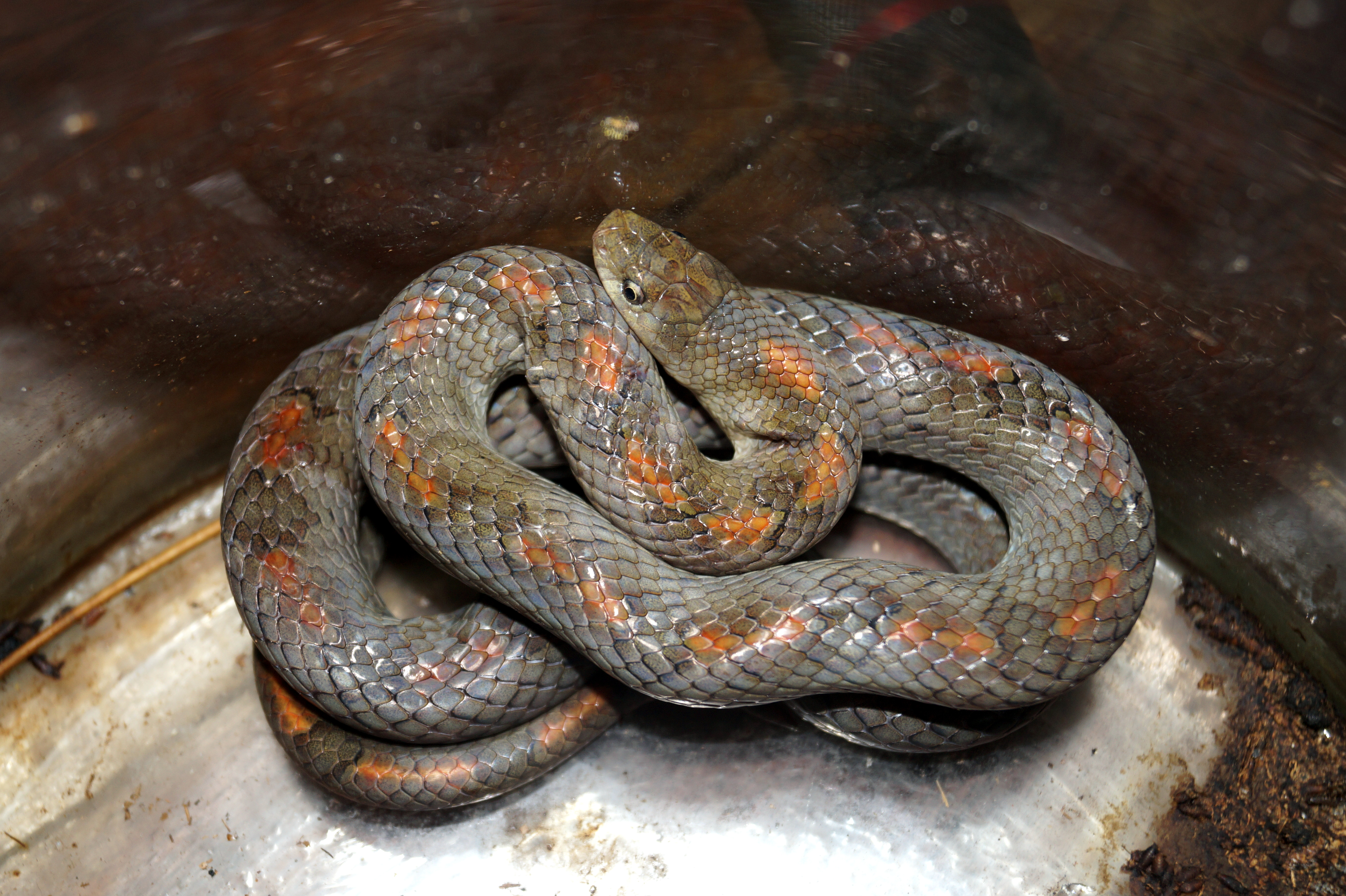
Cat Tien kukri snake

The reptile list includes the following notable species:

- Siamese crocodile Crocodylus siamensis
- Vietnamese leaf turtle Cyclemys pulchristriata

and two endemic species:

- Cyrtodactylus cattienensis: the Cat Tien bent-toed gecko
- Hemiphyllodactylus cattien: the Cat Tien slender gecko

Note: the "Cat Tien kukri snake" is now considered a colour morph of Oligodon cinereus.

Lizards:

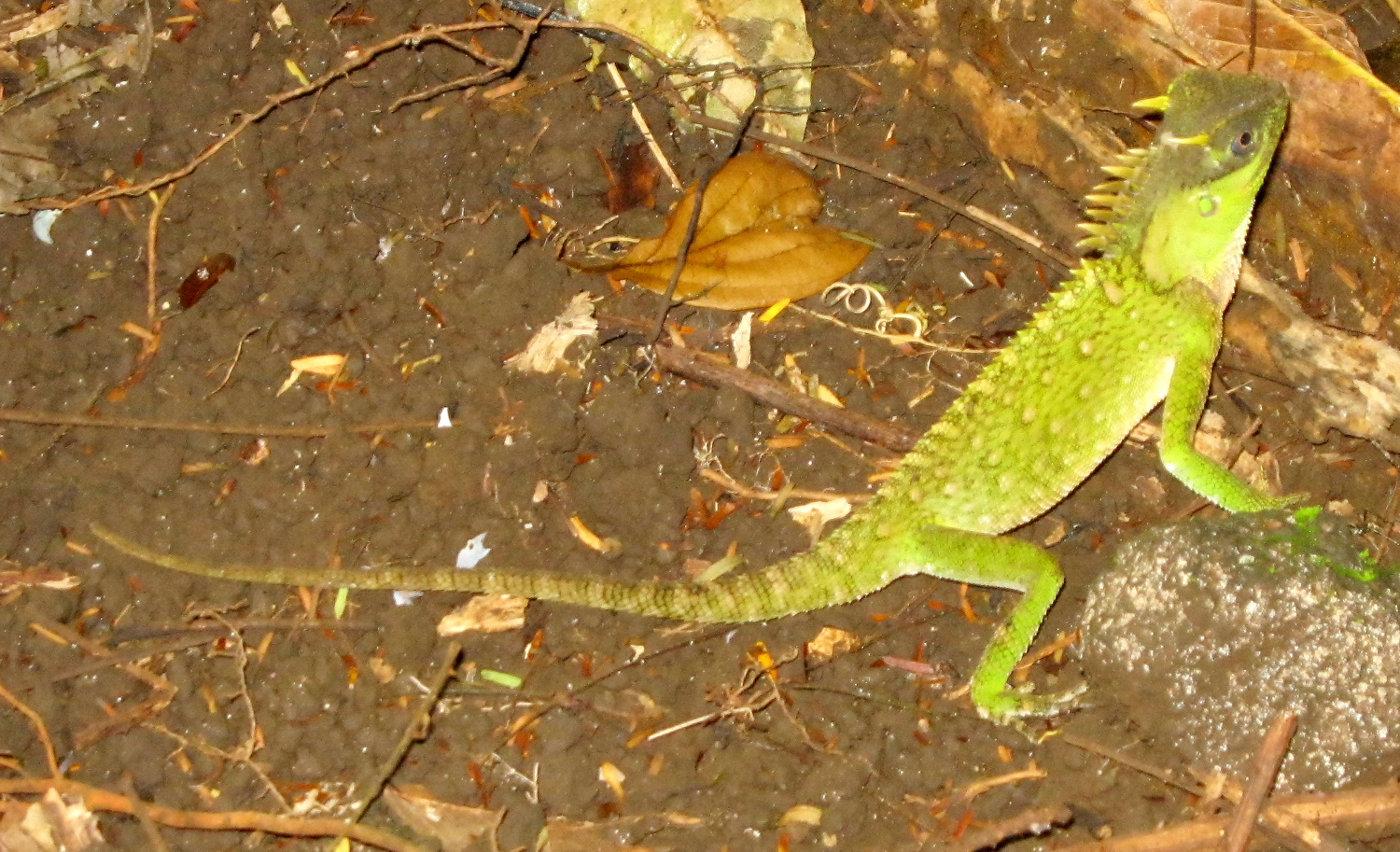
Green pricklenape

- Agamidae
  - Indo-Chinese spiny lizard, green pricklenape Acanthosaura capra
  - crowned spiny lizard Acanthosaura coronata
  - Indo-Chinese tree agama Calotes bachae
  - Indo-Chinese water dragon Physignathus cocincinus
  - spotted gliding lizard Draco maculatus
- Gekkonidae
  - tokay Gekko gecko
  - bent-toed gecko Cyrtodactylus cattienensis
- Scincidae
  - many-striped sun skink (and variants on the name) Eutropis (=Mabuya) multifasciata
  - Indian forest skink Sphenomorphus indicus
- Lacertidae
  - long-tailed lizard Takydromus sexlineatus
- Varanidae
  - water monitor Varanus salvator macromaculatus
  - clouded monitor Varanus nebulosus

Snakes - 43 species recorded including:

- Pythonidae
  - reticulated python Python reticulatus
  - Burmese python Malayopython bivittatus
- Colubridae
  - oriental vine snake Ahaetulla prasina
  - cat snakes: Boiga (4) spp.
    - many-spotted cat snake Boiga multomaculata
    - green cat snake Boiga cyanea

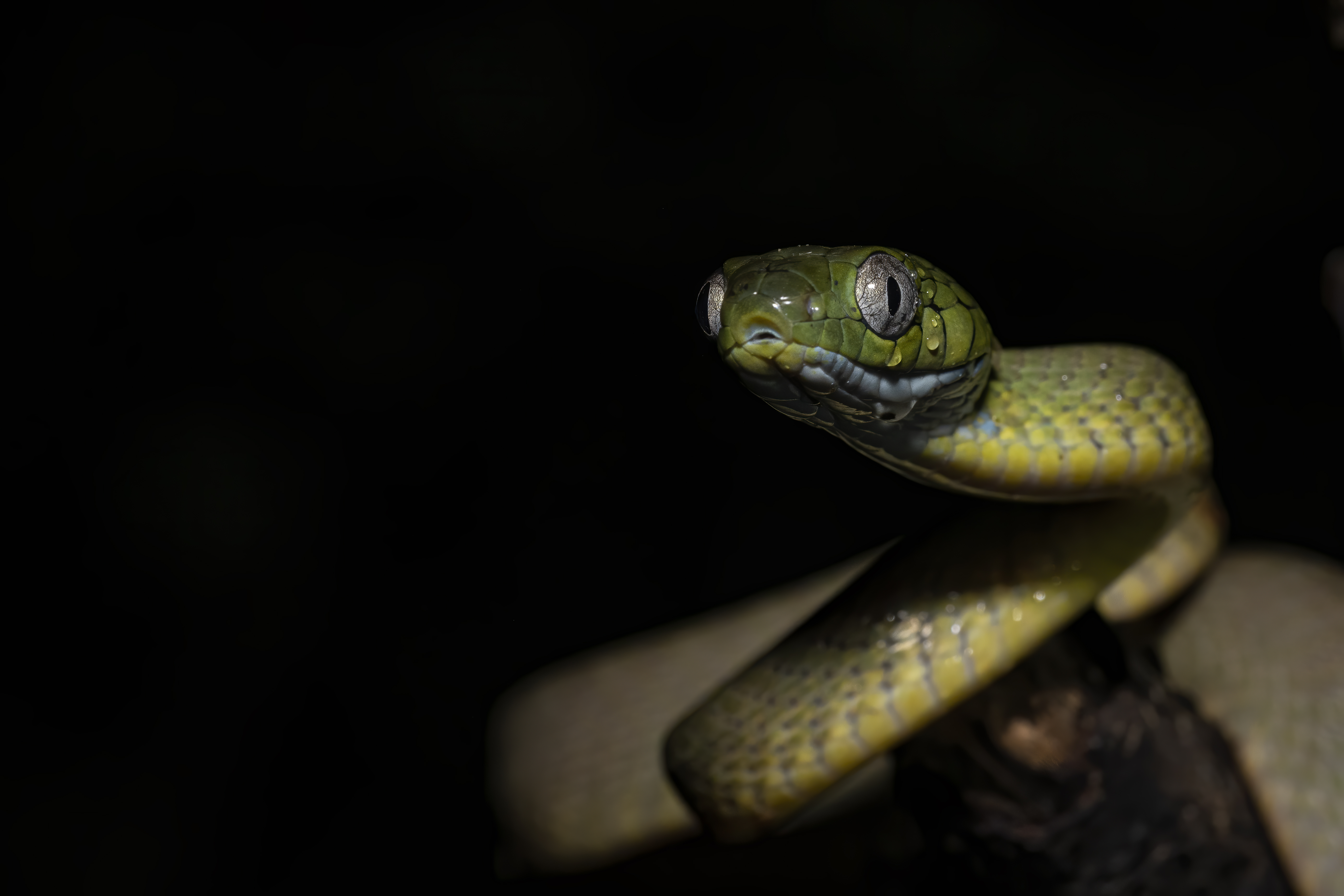
Green cat snake (Boiga cyanea)

  - golden tree snake Chrysopelea ornata
  - wolf snakes: Lycodon (2) spp.
    - Blanford's bridle snake Lycodon davisonii
    - common wolf snake Lycodon capucinus
  - red-tailed racer Gonyosoma oxycephalum
  - kukri snakes: Oligodon (5) spp.
  - keelback snakes: (2) spp.
    - red-necked keelback Rhabdophis subminiatus
    - yellow-spotted keelback Fowlea flavipunctatus
    - checkered keelback Fowlea piscator
- Pareatidae: 2 spp. of slug-eating snakes (Pareas)
- Lamprophiidae: mock-viper Psammodynastes pulverulentus

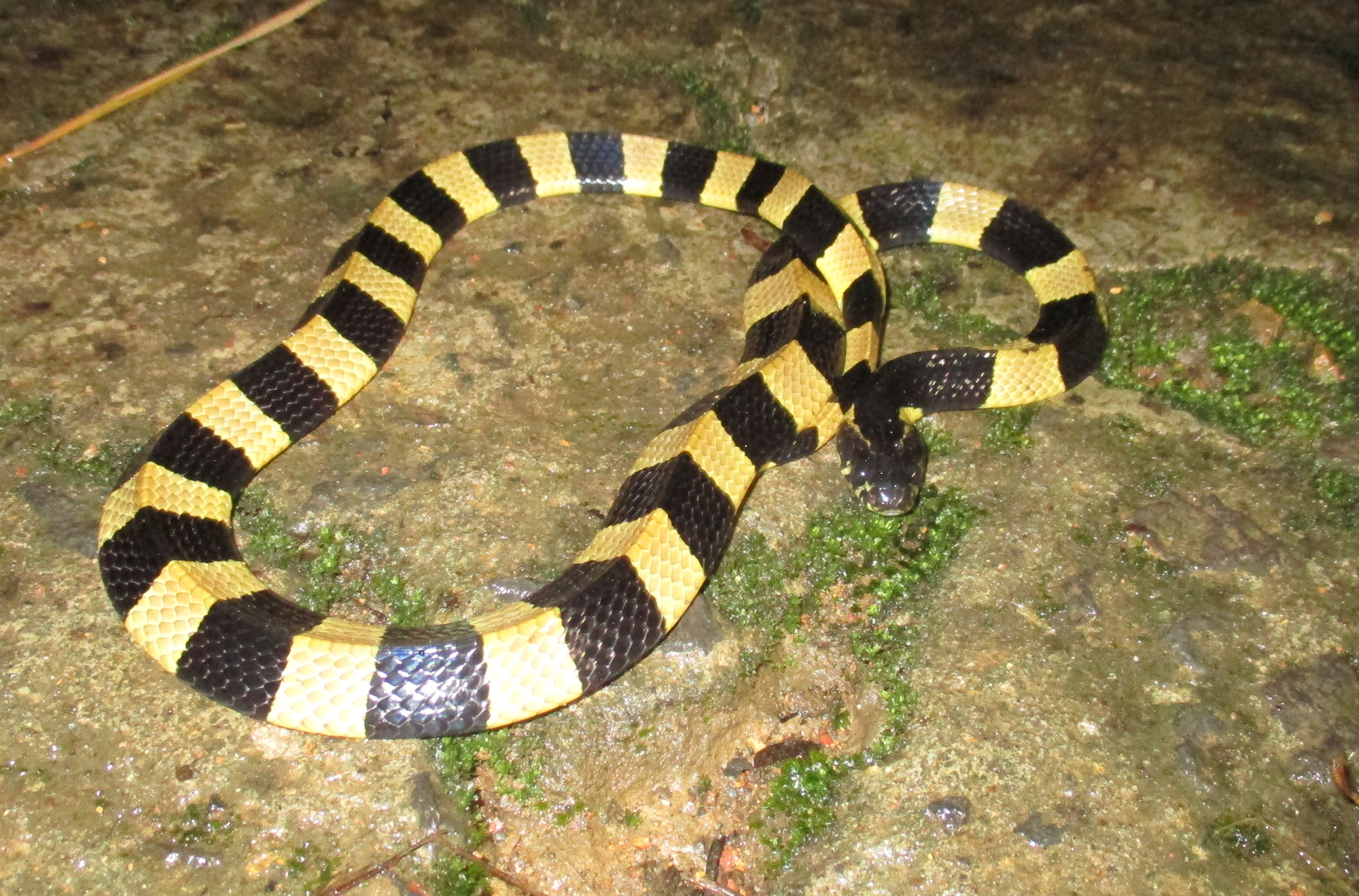
Banded krait in the park

- Elapidae
  - banded krait Bungarus fasciatus
  - Malayan krait (VN form) Bungarus candidus
  - king cobra Ophiophagus hannah
  - Indo-Chinese spitting cobra Naja siamensis
- Viperidae
  - ruby-eyed green pit viper Trimeresurus rubeus

=== Amphibians ===
Frogs:

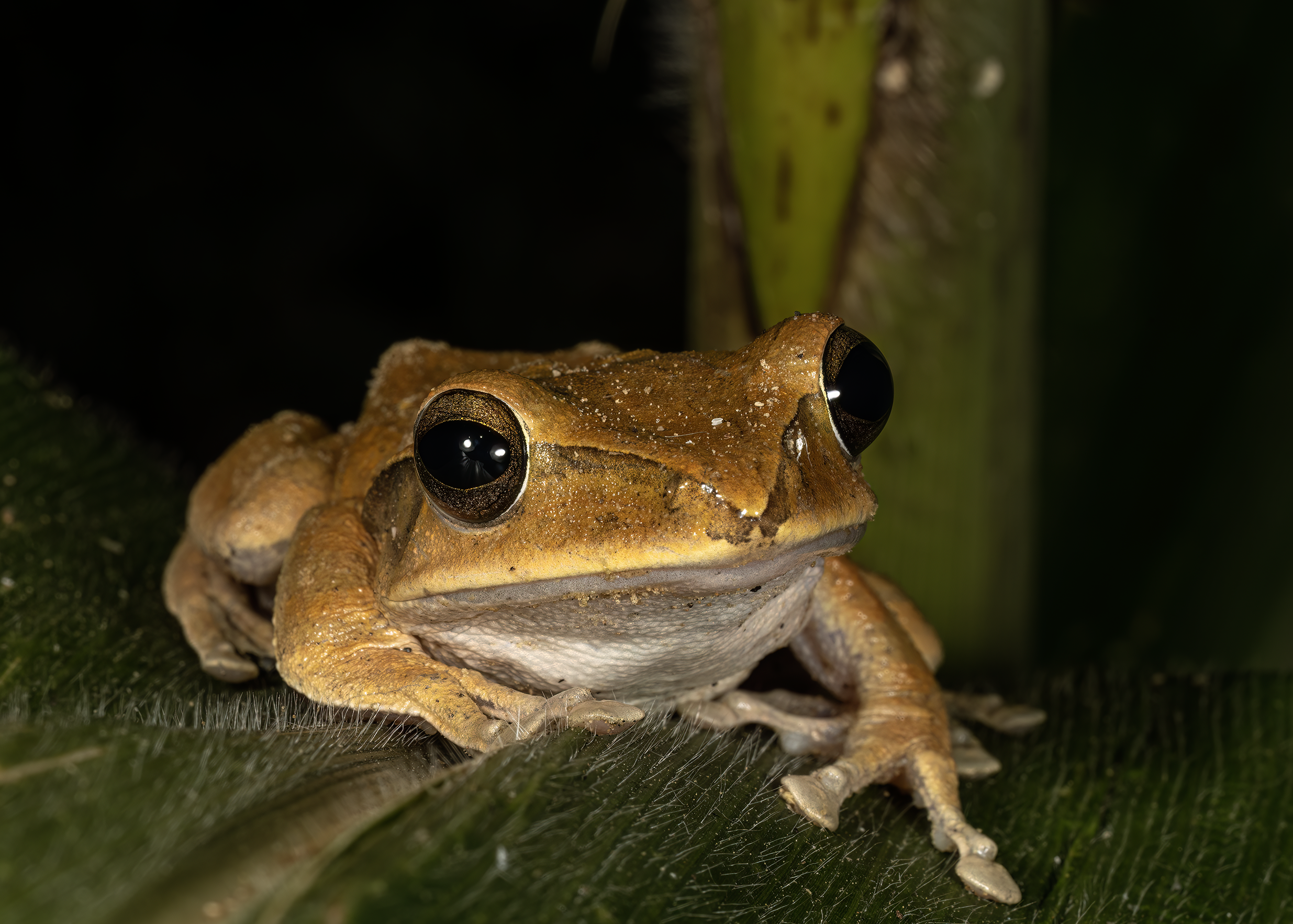
Polypedates megacephalus

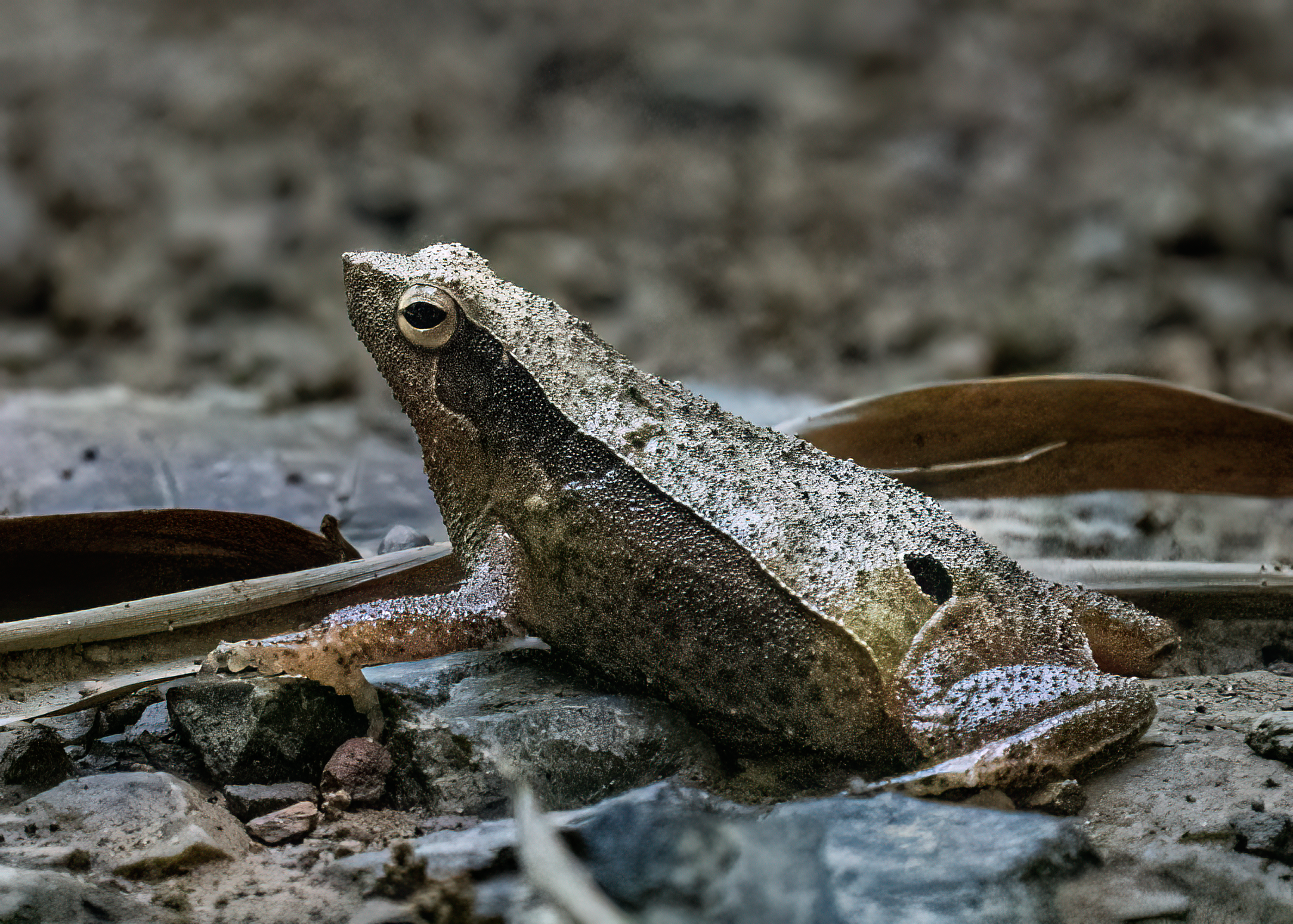
Kalophrynus interlineatus

- True frogs:
  - striped sticky frog Kalophrynus interlineatus
  - paddy frog Fejervarya limnocharis
  - Ma Da paddy frog Micryletta erythropoda
  - Hong Kong whipping frog Polypedates megacephalus
  - Burmese squat frog Glyphoglossus guttulatus
  - Vietnamese bug-eyed frog Theloderma vietnamense
  - Asian painted toad Kaloula pulchra
  - large pygmy frog Microhyla berdmorei
  - dark-sided chorus frog Microhyla heymonsi
  - round-tongued floating frog Occidozyga martensii
  - Mukhlesur's narrow-mouthed frog Microhyla mukhlesuri
  - Taipei frog Hylarana taipehensis
  - Guangdong frog Hylarana macrodactyla
  - Vietnamese fanged-frog Limnonectes poilani
- Toads
  - Asian common toad Duttaphrynus melanostictus
  - river toad Phrynoidis asper

=== Invertebrates ===
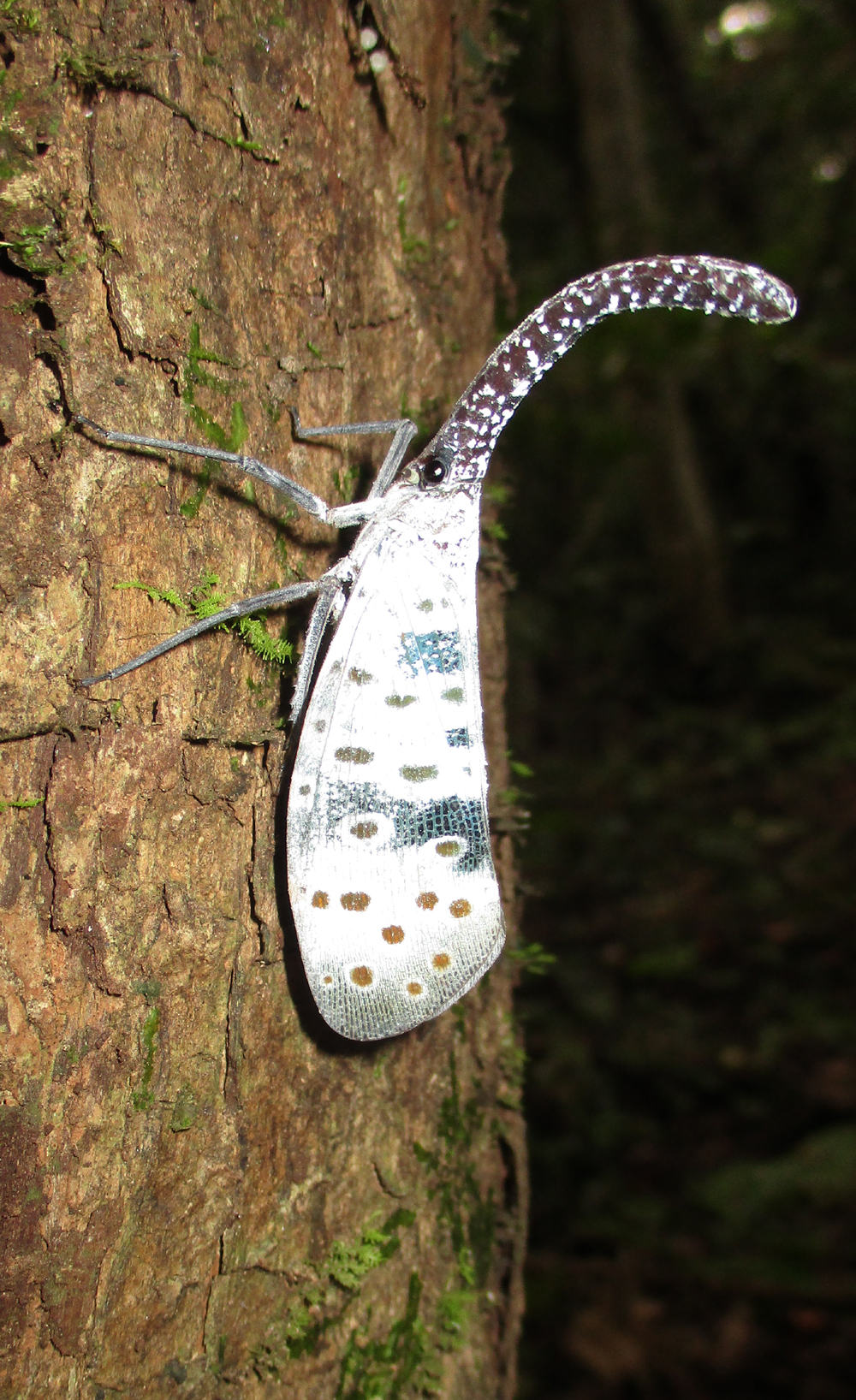
Pyrops coelestinus: a commonly encountered lantern-fly in the park

The most developed insect lists currently cover ants, butterflies, dragonflies, mosquitoes and termites; of the latter, Macrotermes spp. have an important ecological role, with large colony mounds very commonly encountered in the forest.

In 2007, the velvet-worm Eoperipatus totoro was discovered in the Crocodile Lake area by scientists of the Vietnam-Russia Tropical Centre. In 2011, Pergalumna indistincta was first found in dark loam in a Lagerstroemia forest.

In 2025, a new genus and species of parasitoid hymenopteran of the family Eulophidae, Ramiplectrus catiensis, was described from Cát Tiên.

== Threats ==
Cat Tien comprises an important reserve in Vietnam, both for the habitat it protects and the number of species it contains. Although the population of the Javan rhinoceros went into extinction, it is still home to 40 IUCN Red List species, and protects around 30% of Vietnam's species. The park is, however, threatened by encroachment from local communities, illegal logging and poaching. In addition, the park is too small for the larger species found inside it. This has led to either their local extinction or conflict with local people as these animals move beyond the confines of the park. This problem is particularly intense for the park's elephant population, which is prone to wandering and is considered too small to be self sustainable.

Since the early 1990s, partly as a result of the discovery of rhinos in the park, international donors and the Vietnamese government began to invest more money in protecting the park and managing the resources of local State Forest Enterprises, nearby and adjoining forests (including Vinh Cuu Nature Reserve), in co-ordination with the park as a whole. There have been moves to combine a management plan that allows for both traditional park management and some limited resource utilisation by local people, which include the Stieng, Chau Ma (now concentrated in Ta Lai) and Cho'ro minorities.

In 2008 the Forestry Protection Department collaborating with the Endangered Asian Species Trust (UK), Monkey World Ape Rescue (UK) and Pingtung Wildlife Rescue Centre (Taiwan) founded the Dao Tien Endangered Primate Species Centre. The centre focusses on the rescue, rehabilitation and release of the four endangered primates found in Cat Tien (golden-cheeked gibbon, black-shanked douc, pygmy loris and silvered langur), developing Government guidelines for release of primates. The centre conducts informative daily educational tours explaining the centre's work, with a chance to see young rehabilitated gibbons in the trees.
