= Vietnam-Russia Tropical Centre =

Joint Vietnam - Russia Tropical Science and Technology Research Center
- Trung tâm Nhiệt đới Việt - Nga

Agency overview
- Formed: 1988
- Jurisdiction: Vietnam
- Headquarters: Cầu Giấy district, Hanoi, Vietnam
- Agency executives: Colonel General Nguyễn Trường Thắng, Chief of Vietnamese Division; Konstantin Ilyich Mogilevsky, Chief of Russian Division; Major General Đặng Hồng Triển, Director of Vietnamese Division; Dr. Andrey Nikolaevich Kuznetsov, Director of Russian Division
- Parent department: Ministry of National Defence (Vietnam)
- Website: http://trungtamnhietdoivietnga.com.vn/

Joint Vietnam - Russia Tropical Science and Technology Research Center (VRTC) (Vietnamese: Trung tâm Nhiệt đới Việt - Nga, Russian: Российско-Вьетнамский тропический научно-исследовательский и технологический центр) is a scientific research organization in Vietnam. This Centre was established in 1988 by an Agreement between the Vietnamese Ministry of National Defence and the Russian Academy of Sciences.

The Center is headquartered in Hanoi and has branches in Ho Chi Minh City and Nha Trang, with a field station in Cat Tien National Park, where it maintains a meteorology tower.

== History ==
The centre was established on 7 March 1988 as the Vietnam - Soviet Tropical Centre, under Decree No. 25-HĐBT by the Government of Vietnam, pursuant to the intergovernmental agreement signed on 7 March 1987 between Vietnam and the Soviet Union concerning cooperation in the construction of a special facility in Vietnam.

Under the Supplementary Protocol signed on 11 November 1993, Russia succeeded the Soviet Union in fulfilling the responsibilities set out in the Agreement signed on 7 March 1987, which led to the subsequent rename of the centre to Vietnam - Russia Tropical Centre for Joint Scientific Research and Technology, commonly known as the Vietnam - Russia Tropical Centre (VRTC).

Since its establishment, the Government of Vietnam and Soviet Council of Ministers (and subsequently Government of Russia) have signed four supplementary protocols to the Agreement, in 1989, 1993, 2004 and 2018.

In 2026, following Tô Lâm's state visit to Russia, the Centre established a disease control testing centre in Hanoi.

== Governance and focus areas ==
=== Functions ===
VRTC focusses on:

- Conducting scientific and technological research in tropical sciences, including materials science, ecology, and biomedicine to solve urgent problems of both Vietnam and Russia.
- Practically deploying and supporting the application of innovative solutions and advanced technologies in the two countries.
- Coordinating and supporting the cooperation between Vietnamese and Russian organisations in fulfilling scientific and technological tasks
- Training Vietnamese and Russian experts, including qualification training and improvement
- Participating in the implementation of bilateral cooperation programs and projects between the two countries
- Cooperating and participating in scientific and technological projects with other international and scientific organisations

The Centre maintains an online atlas for all living organism in the Spratly Islands.

=== Departments and facilities ===
The Centre administers nine departments and facilities, including:

- Institute of Tropical Materials
- Institute of Tropical Ecology
- Institute of Tropical Biomedicine
- Institute of Chemistry and Environment
- Institute of Biotechnology
- Southern (Ho Chi Minh City) Branch (including Cần Giờ Laboratory)
- Coastal (Nha Trang) Branch (including Đầm Báy Ocean Laboratory)
- Centre for Technological Transfer and Equipment
- Russian Language Centre

== Achievements ==
After 36 years of operation, VRTC operates as a tropical science and technology organization in Vietnam, Russia, and internationally. Its scientific and technological work supports national defense, security, and socio-economic development.

As a bridge in science and technology between Vietnam and Russia, the Center has maintained proven working relationships with numerous Russian scientific organizations and experts. It has also proactively developed partnerships beyond Russia, laying the groundwork for deeper, broader, and more effective international collaborations in the future.

Through its achievements, the center has actively contributed to strengthening and developing the traditional friendship and comprehensive strategic partnership between the two countries.
