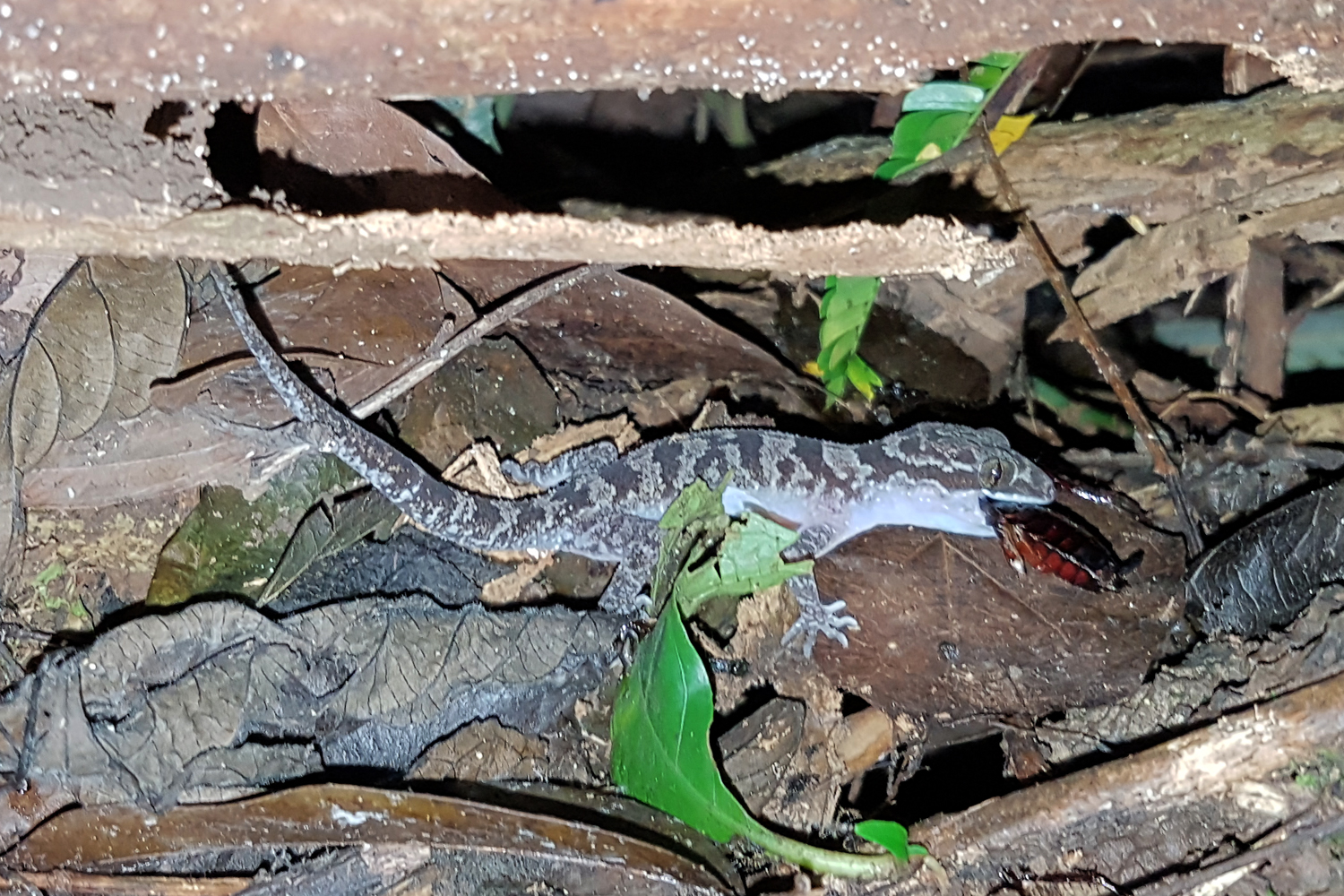
- eating a cockroach in Cat Tien National Park

Scientific classification
- Kingdom: Animalia
- Phylum: Chordata
- Class: Reptilia
- Order: Squamata
- Suborder: Gekkota
- Family: Gekkonidae
- Genus: Cyrtodactylus
- Species: C. cattienensis

Binomial name
- Cyrtodactylus cattienensis Geissler, Nazarov, Orlov, Böhme, Phung, Nguyen, and Ziegler, 2009

= Cyrtodactylus cattienensis =

Species of lizard

Cyrtodactylus cattienensis, or the Cattien bent-toed gecko, is a gecko endemic to southern Vietnam. It is known from the Đồng Nai and Bà Rịa–Vũng Tàu provinces. Its type locality is within the Cát Tiên National Park, and the species was named after the park.

== Description ==
It is small in size, with a maximum snout–vent length (SVL) of 69 mm (2.7 in). A neck band is present, extending to the posterior margin of the eye; its trunk, tail and limbs bear irregularly-shaped bands: 4–6 light bands on trunk and 4–12 white bands on tail; it has 16–22 irregular longitudinal rows of dorsal tubercles. Its lateral folds are weakly developed or absent, without enlarged tubercles. Males have 6–8 precloacal pores in angular continuous series and there is a patch of enlarged precloacal scales present in both sexes. Males are on average smaller (55 mm SVL) than females (61 mm SVL).

== Habitat ==
Cyrtodactylus cattienensis inhabits lowland seasonal tropical forest. Most individuals were found on large leaves of scrub vegetation and young trees some 1 m above ground. Some specimens were also found during the day, under volcanic rocks or below the bark of rotten trees.

== Behaviour ==
Males produce calls consisting of a long series of call groups. All individuals can emit "squeaks" as signal of discomfort and stress.
