= Đồng Nai Biosphere Reserve =

Biosphere reserve in Vietnam

- Location in Vietnam
- Coordinates: 11°26′23″N 107°10′51″E
- Country: Vietnam
- Province: Đồng Nai Bình Dương Bình Phước Lâm Đồng Đắk Nông

Area
  - Total: 3,732 sq mi (9,665 km^{2})
- Time zone: UTC+7 (UTC+7)

Đồng Nai Biosphere Reserve, formerly known as Cát Tiên Biosphere Reserve, is a biosphere reserve located mainly in Đồng Nai province, Vietnam. Cát Tiên Biosphere Reserve was recognized by UNESCO in 2001. In 2011, it was expanded and renamed as Đồng Nai Biosphere Reserve.

It covers an area of 966,563 hectares, with territories belonging to 5 provinces of Đồng Nai, Bình Dương, Bình Phước, Lâm Đồng and Đắk Nông. It is the largest biodiversity conservation area in the Southeast of Vietnam.

Its core area is 172,502 hectares, including Cát Tiên National Park and Đồng Nai Nature-Cultural Conservation Area.
