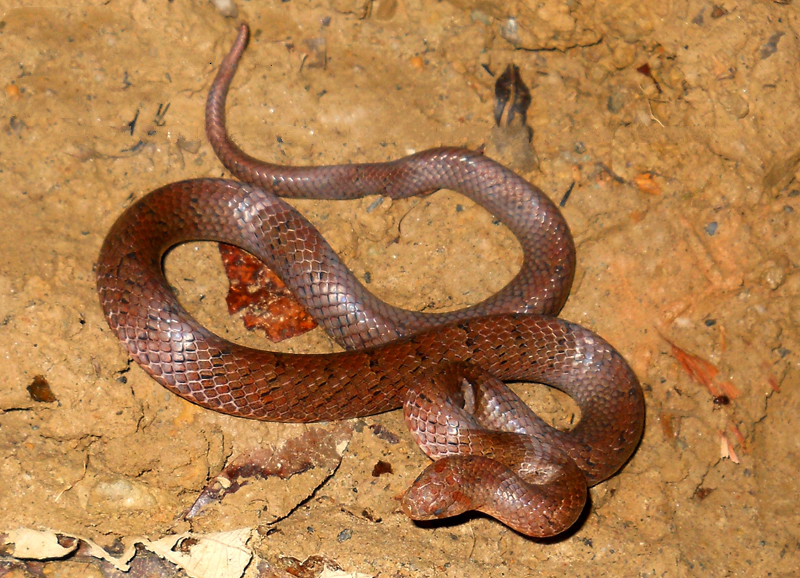

Conservation status
- Least Concern (IUCN 3.1)

Scientific classification
- Kingdom: Animalia
- Phylum: Chordata
- Class: Reptilia
- Order: Squamata
- Suborder: Serpentes
- Family: Colubridae
- Genus: Oligodon
- Species: O. cinereus

Binomial name
- Oligodon cinereus (Günther, 1864)

Synonyms
- Oligodon cattienensis Vassilieva, Geissler, Galoyan, Poyarkov, Van Devender & Böhme, 2013; Simotes swinhonis Günther, 1864; Simotes cinereus Günther, 1864; Simotes violaceus Boulenger, 1890

= Oligodon cinereus =

Species of snake

Oligodon cinereus, the ashy kukri snake or Günther's kukri snake, is a species of snake in the family Colubridae.

== Description ==
See snake scales for terminology

Nasal divided; portion of rostral seen from above as long as its distance from tho frontal or a little shorter; suture between the internasals usually shorter than that between the prefrontals: frontal as long as its distance from the end of the snout, as long as the parietals; loreal usually longer than deep; preocular single, usually with a small subocular below, between the third and fourth labials; one or two postoculars; temporals 1+2; upper labials 8, fourth and fifth entering the eye, 3 or 4 lower labials in contact with the anterior chin-shields; posterior chin-shields one half or loss than one half the size of the anterior. Scales in 17 rows. Ventrals 160-180 (196); anal undivided; subcaudals 34–39. Pale brown, purplish or reddish above; markings on the head very indistinct; uniform above and below. Total length 30 inches; tail 3.

== Distribution ==
Oligodon cinereus occurs in northeast India (Assam; Arunachal Pradesh), Bangladesh, Myanmar, Thailand, Cambodia, Laos, Vietnam, Peninsular Malaysia, and southern China (including Hong Kong and Hainan).

== Colour morphs ==
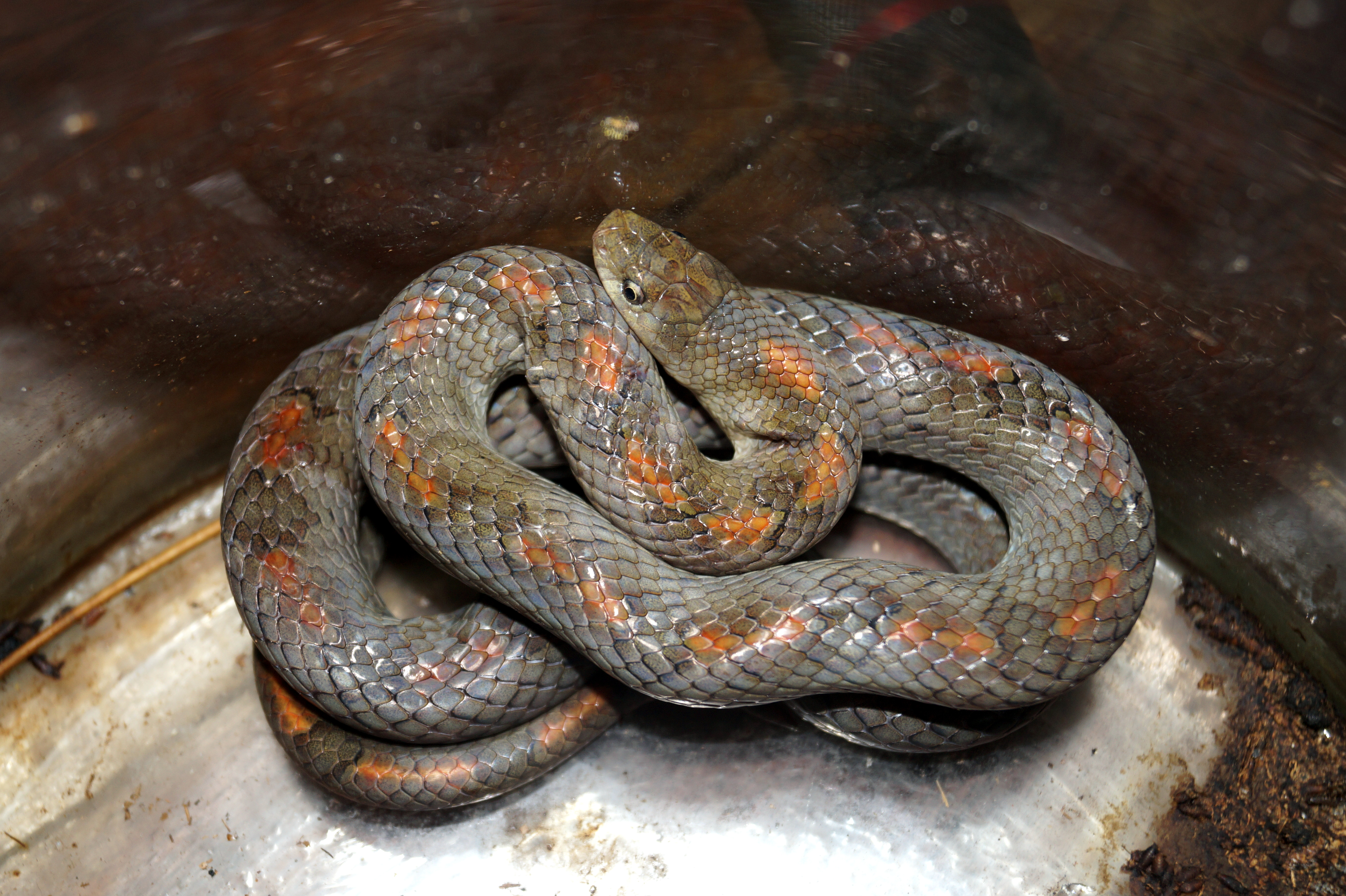
"Cat Tien kukri snake" in Cat Tien National Park.

This species has variable colouration, and O. cattienensis, the "Cat Tien kukri snake" was placed at species level, but is now considered a colour morph of O. cinereus.
