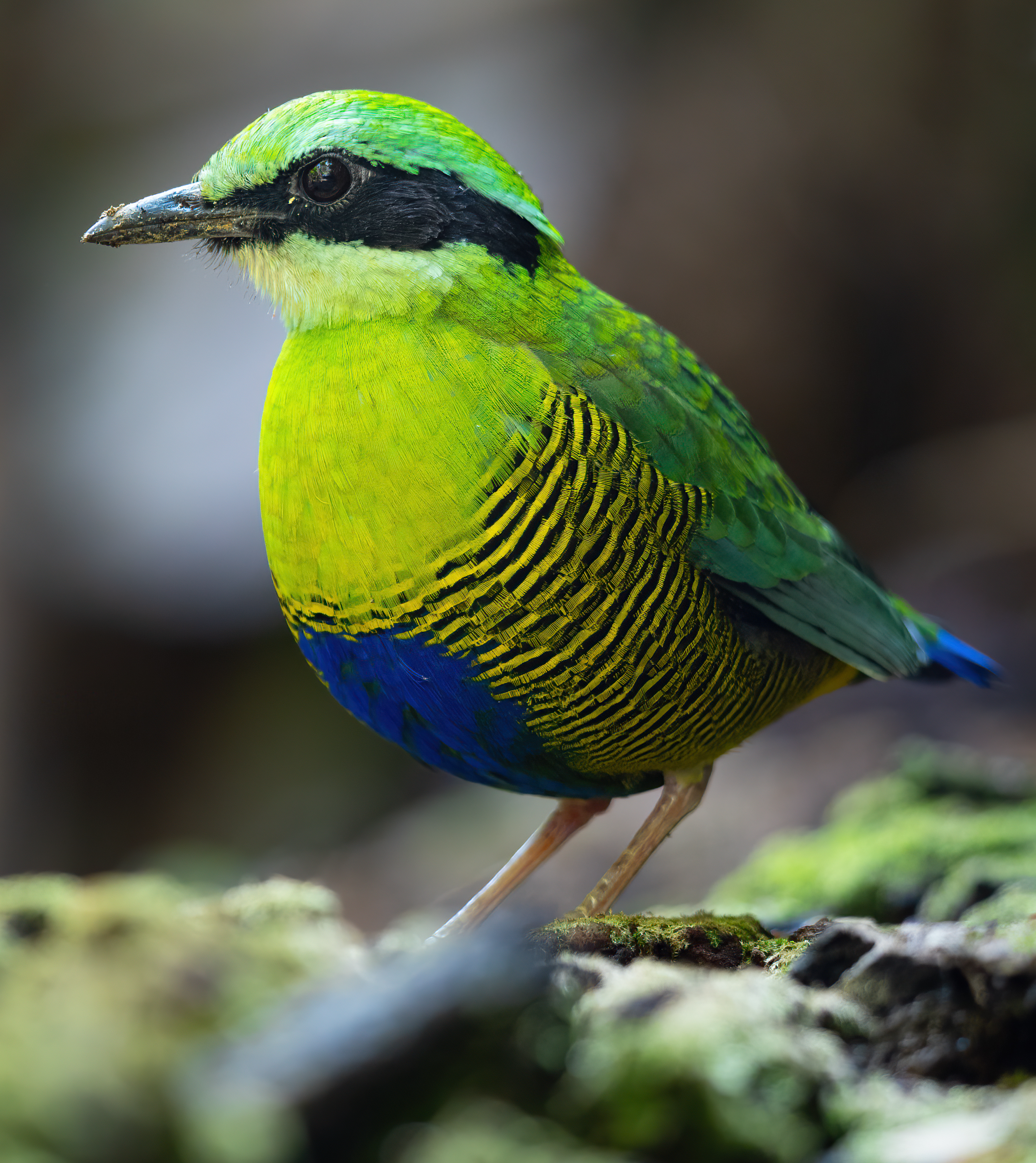
- Bar-bellied Pitta in Cat Tien National Park

Conservation status
- Least Concern (IUCN 3.1)

Scientific classification
- Kingdom: Animalia
- Phylum: Chordata
- Class: Aves
- Order: Passeriformes
- Family: Pittidae
- Genus: Hydrornis
- Species: H. elliotii

Binomial name
- Hydrornis elliotii (Oustalet, 1874)

Synonyms
- Pitta elliotii

= Bar-bellied pitta =

Species of bird

The bar-bellied pitta (Hydrornis elliotii) is a species of bird in the family Pittidae. It is found in Cambodia, Laos, Thailand, and Vietnam. Its natural habitat is seasonal tropical forest.

== Gallery ==
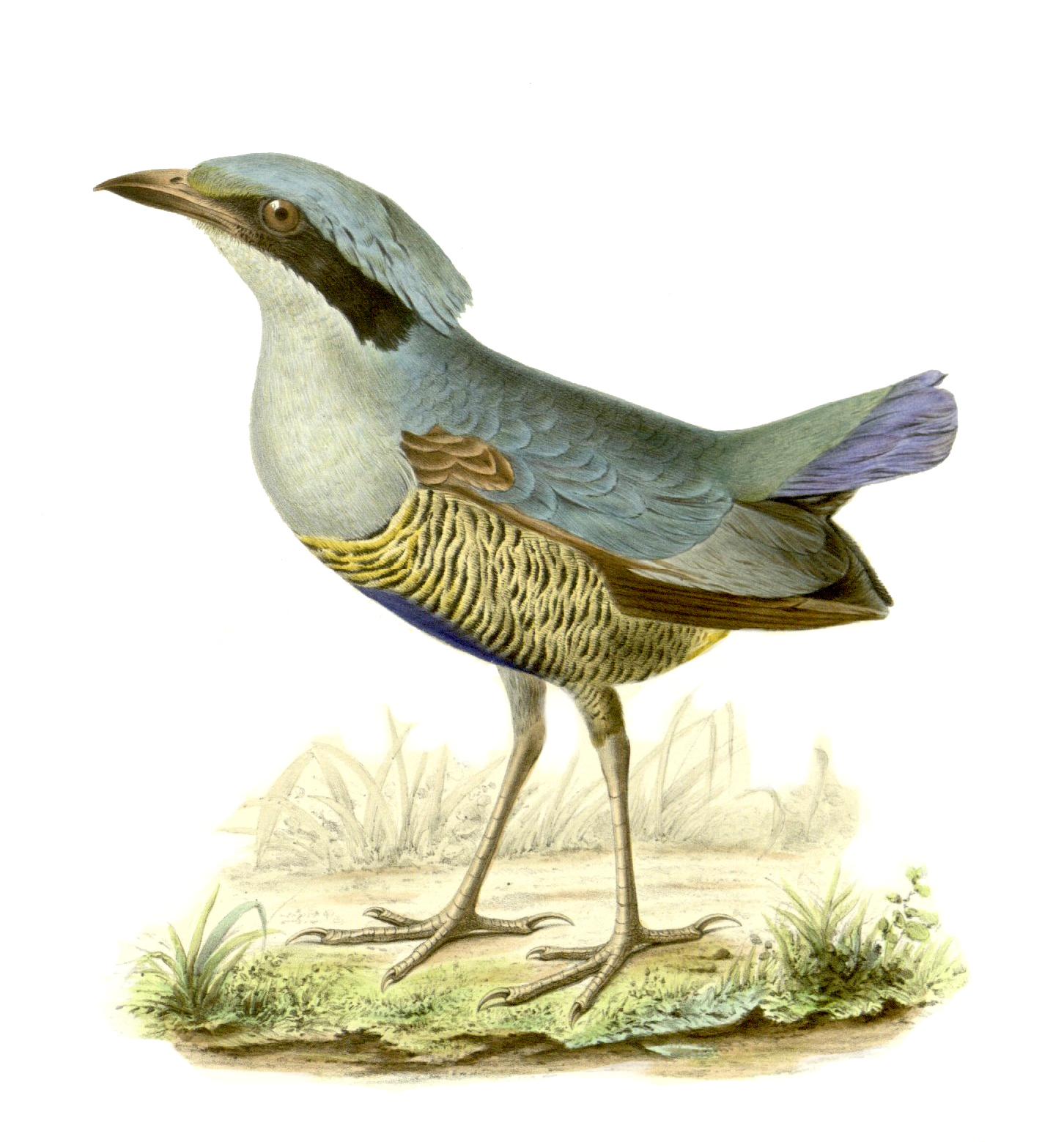
Bar-bellied pitta

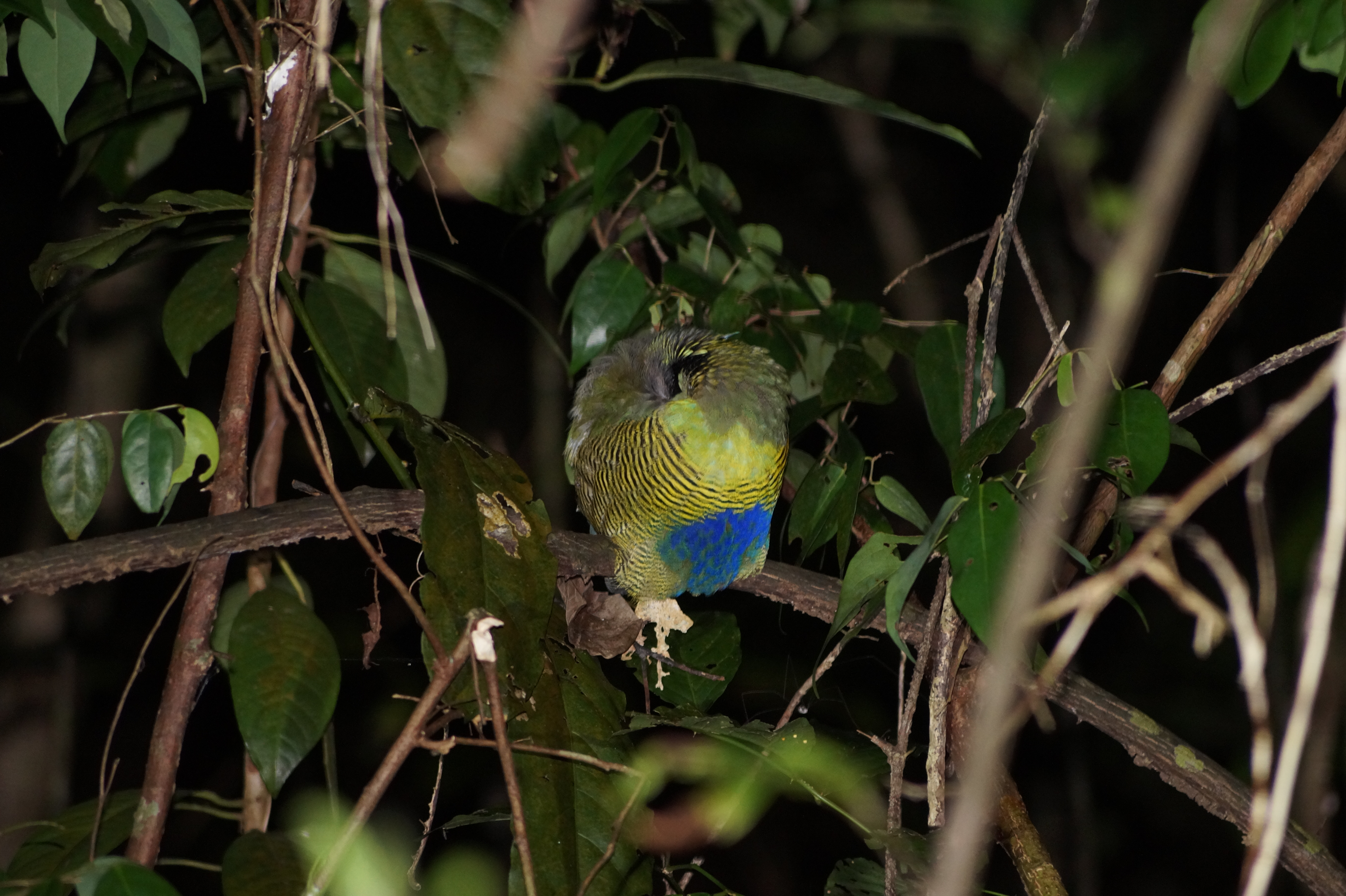
Bar-bellied pitta

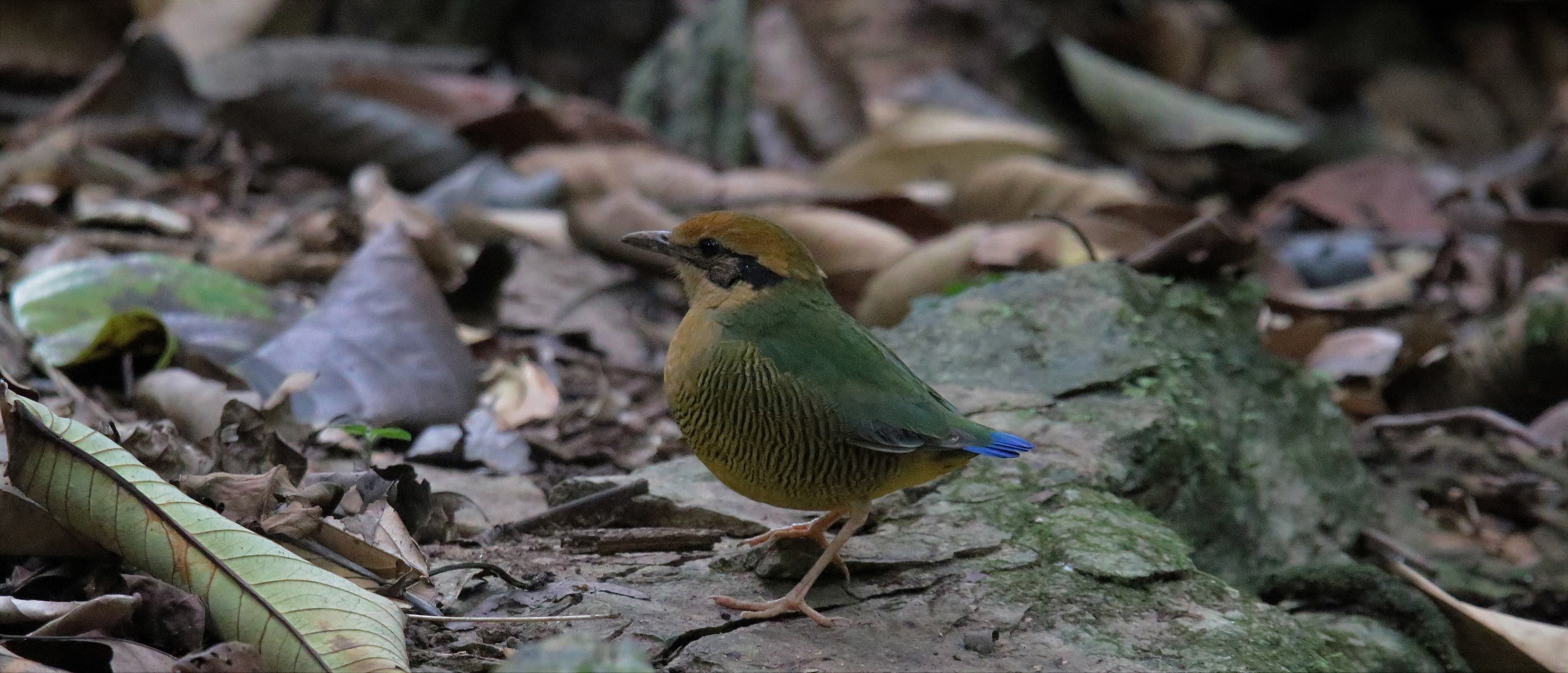
Bar-bellied pitta (female)
