= Tà Lài =

Tà Lài Xã Tà Lài
- Rural commune
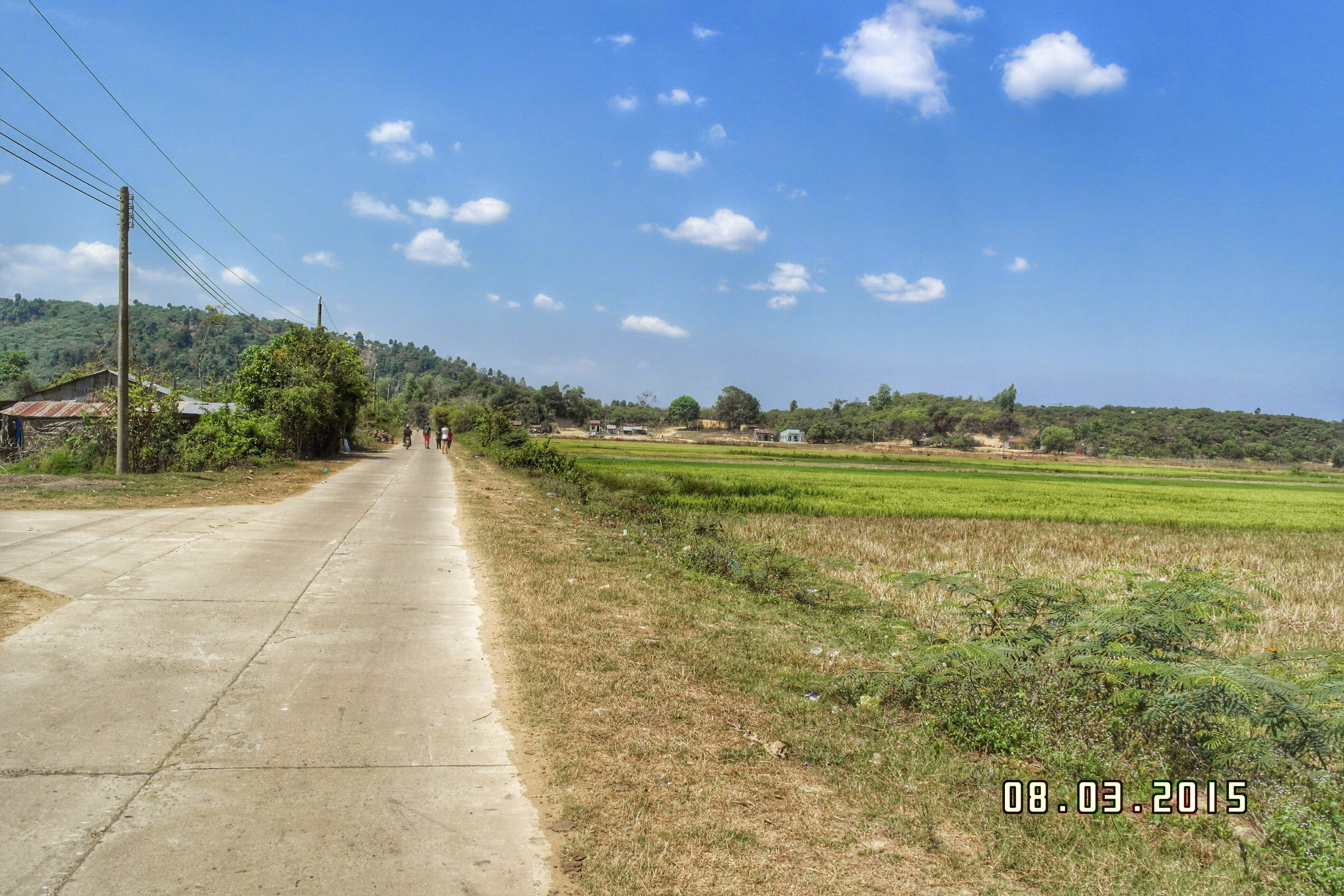
- Tà Lài

- Location in Vietnam
- Coordinates: 11°22.5′N 107°21.5′E
- Country: Vietnam
- Municipality: Đồng Nai

Area
  - Total: 27.4 km^{2} (10.6 sq mi)

Population (2012)
  - Total: 7,382
- Time zone: UTC+7 (UTC+7)

Tà Lài is a rural commune (xã) of Đồng Nai, Vietnam.

Most of the residents are of the Ma and X'tieng ethnic minorities; they were re-settled after the establishment of Cát Tiên National Park.
