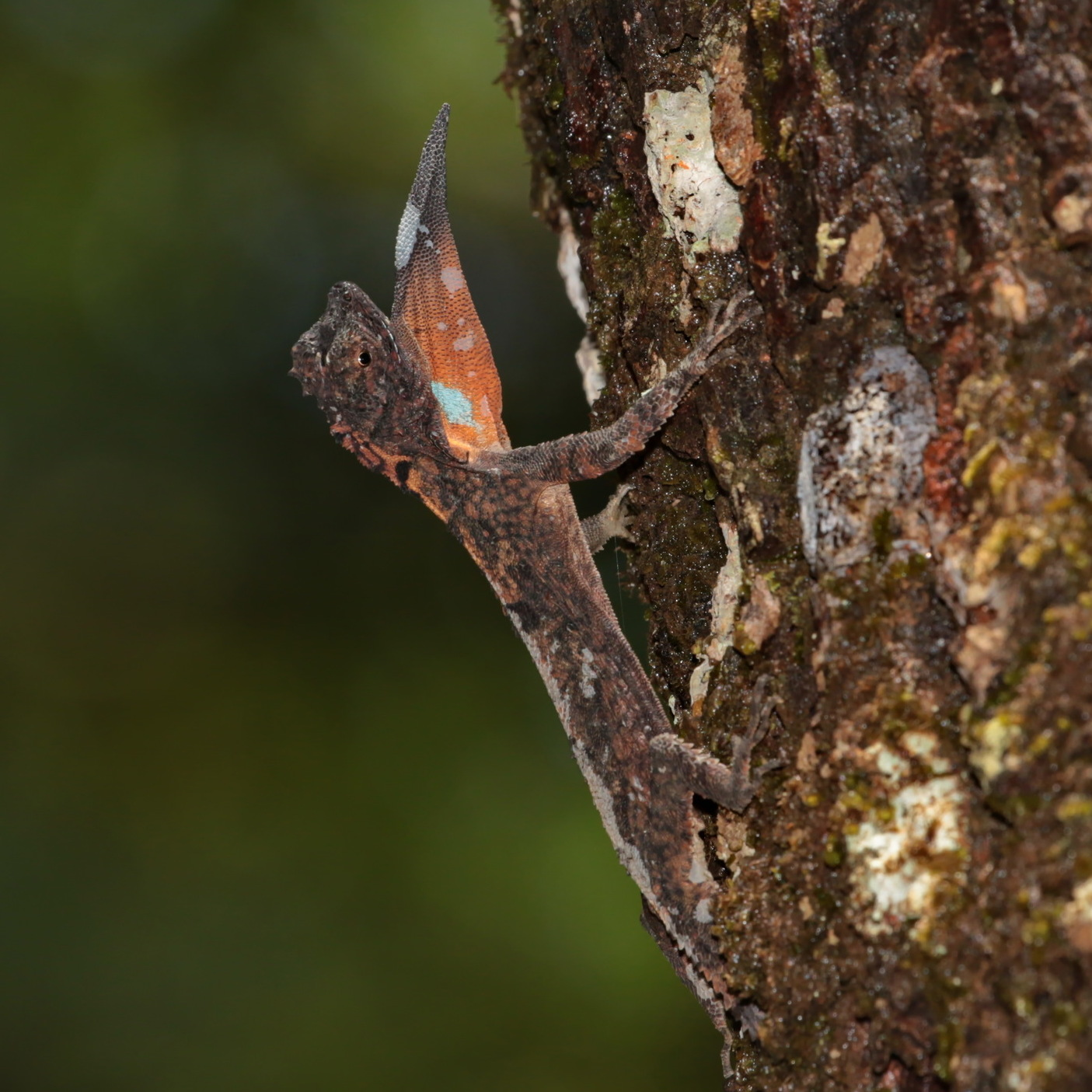
- Draco maculatus in Thailand

Conservation status
- Least Concern (IUCN 3.1)

Scientific classification
- Kingdom: Animalia
- Phylum: Chordata
- Class: Reptilia
- Order: Squamata
- Suborder: Iguania
- Family: Agamidae
- Genus: Draco
- Species: D. maculatus

Binomial name
- Draco maculatus (Gray, 1845)
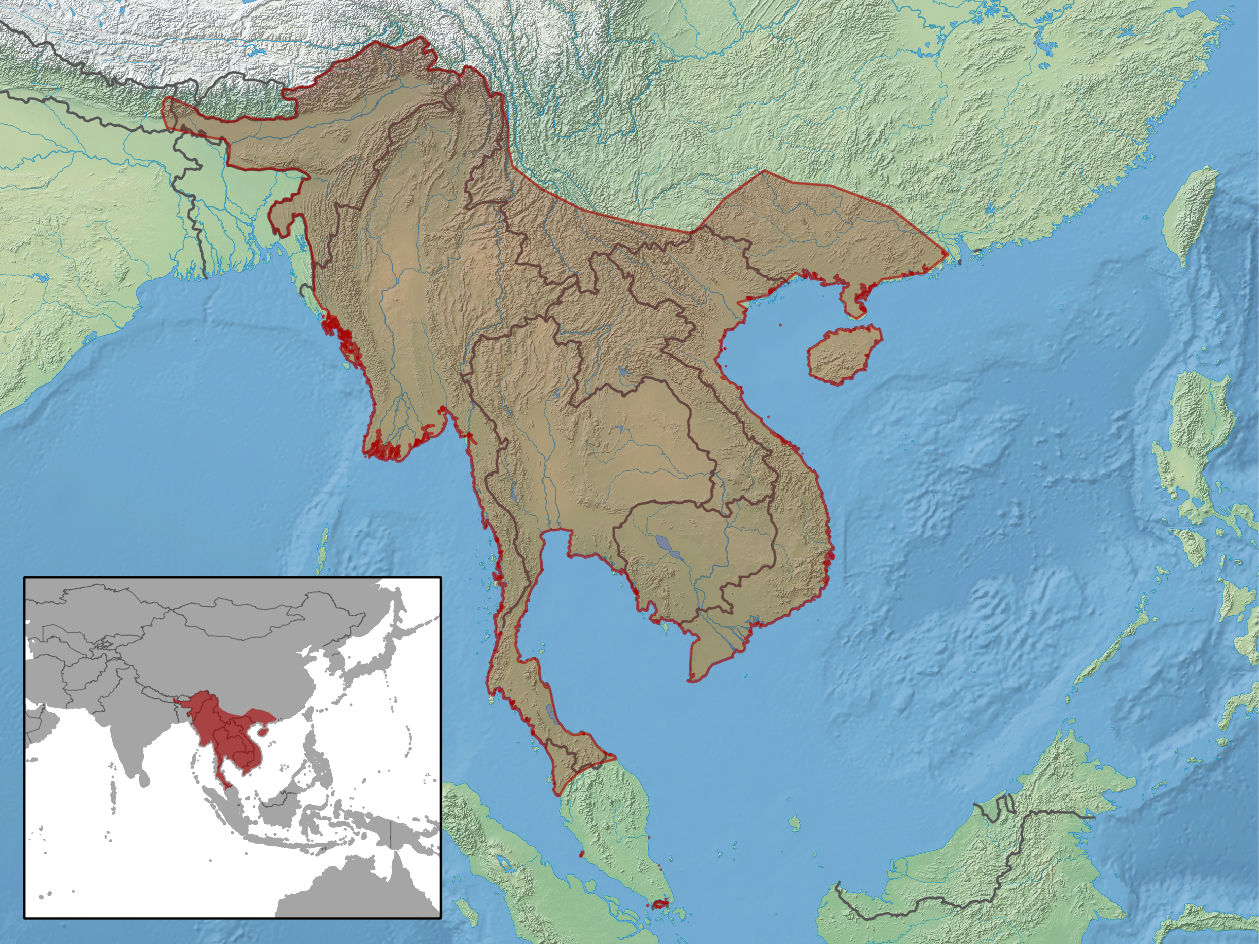

Synonyms
- Dracunculus maculatus Gray, 1845; Draco maculatus — Cantor, 1847; Draco haasei Boettger, 1893; Draco maculatus — Boulenger, 1885

= Draco maculatus =

Species of lizard

Draco maculatus, commonly known as the spotted flying dragon or spotted gliding lizard, is a species of agamid flying lizard endemic to Southeast Asia. It is capable of gliding from tree to tree.

== Description ==
Head small; snout a little longer than the diameter of the orbit; nostril lateral, directed outwards; tympanum scaly. Upper head-scales unequal, strongly keeled; a compressed prominent scale on the posterior part of the superciliary region; 7 to 11 upper labials. The male's gular appendage very large, always much longer than the head, and frequently twice as long; female also with a well-developed but smaller gular sac. Male with a very small nuchal crest. Dorsal scales but little larger than the ventrals, irregular, smooth or very feebly keeled; on each side of the back a series of large trihedral keeled distant scales. The fore limb stretched forwards reaches beyond the tip of the snout; the adpressed hind limb reaches a little beyond the elbow of the adpressed fore limb, or to the axilla. Greyish above, with more or less distinct darker markings; a more or less distinct darker interorbital spot; wing-membranes above with numerous small round black spots, which are seldom confluent, beneath immaculate or with a few black spots; a blue spot on each side of the base of the gular appendage.

From snout to vent length, 82 mm (3.2 in); tail, 115 mm (4.5 in).

== Subspecies ==
The following four subspecies (or races) are recognized, including the nominotypical subspecies:

- Draco maculatus divergens Taylor, 1934: NW Thailand; type locality = "Chiang Mai, N Siam"; restricted to "Doi Suthep Mountain" by Taylor, 1963.
- Draco maculatus haasei Boettger, 1893: E Thailand, Cambodia, S Vietnam; type locality = "Chantaboon, Siam".
- Draco maculatus maculatus (Gray, 1845)
- Draco maculatus whiteheadi Boulenger, 1900: N Vietnam, Hainan; type locality = "Five-finger Mountains, interior of Hainan".

== Geographic range ==
From Assam and Yunnan to Singapore.

Southern China (Hainan, Guangxi, Yunnan, Tibet), India (E. Himalayas to Assam), Bangladesh (Satchari National Park, Sylhet), Myanmar, Laos, Vietnam, Thailand and W. Malaysia.
