= Air Education and Training Command Studies and Analysis Squadron =

Air Education and Training Command Studies and Analysis Squadron
- Active: 1941–1943; 1944; 1944–1946; 1965–1973; 1973–1991; 1992–present
- Country: United States
- Branch: United States Air Force
- Role: Advanced planning
- Part of: Air Education and Training Command
- Garrison/HQ: Joint Base San Antonio - Randolph
- Motto: Hit My Smoke (1964-1973) Truth Shall Be Found (1992-1994) Vincit Omnia Veritas Latin Truth Conquers All (2001-present)
- Engagements: American Theater Antisubmarine Campaign; Pacific Theater of Operations; Vietnam War
- Decorations: Distinguished Unit Citation; Presidential Unit Citation; Air Force Outstanding Unit Award with Combat "V" Device; Air Force Organizational Excellence Award; Republic of Vietnam Gallantry Cross with Palm

Insignia
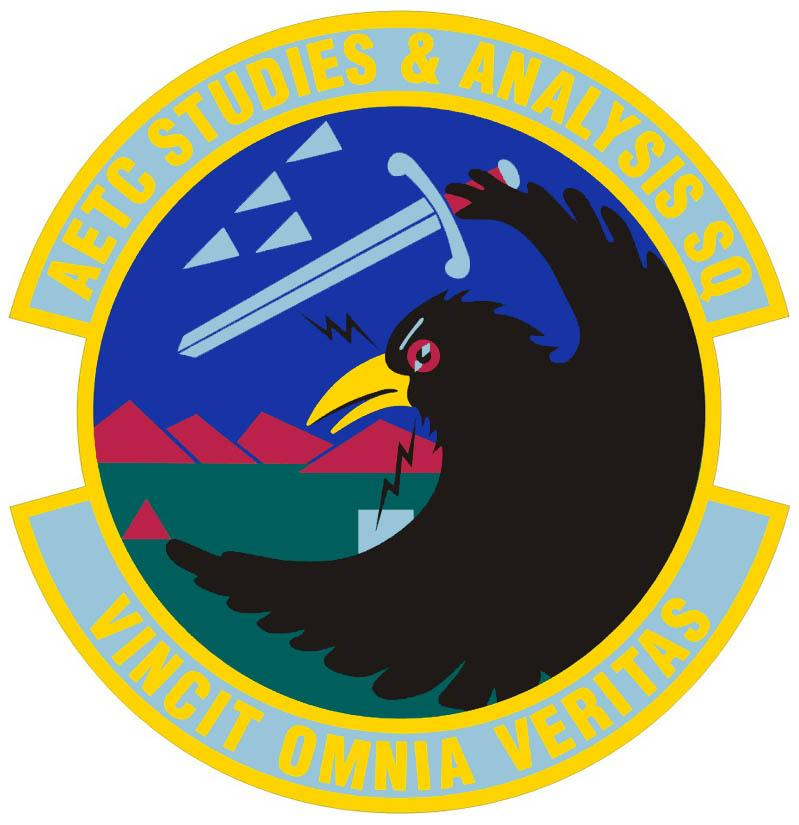
- AETC Studies & Analysis Squadron emblem (Note: Approved 5 June 2001. The emblem is described: Per fess azure and vert, in fess a mountain range gules overall rising out of sinister base a demi-raven, wings elevated and displayed proper, with an eye of the third (gules) radiating two electronics flashes sable, one terminating in front of a billet at nombril point celeste, the other terminates at a sword of the like hafted gules, extending point downwards from the sinister wing. The dexter wing points to a red triangle in dexter flank, in dexter chief, four light blue flight symbols descending bendwise sinister in tactical formation one, two and one, all within a narrow bordure yellow.)

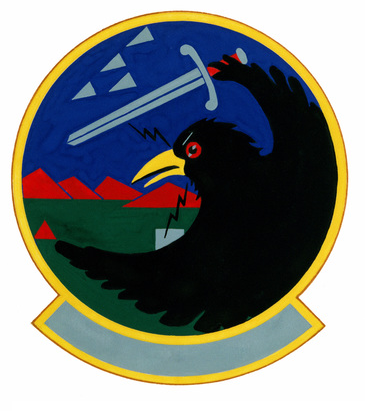
- 21st Tactical Air Support Squadron emblem (approved 17 September 1990)

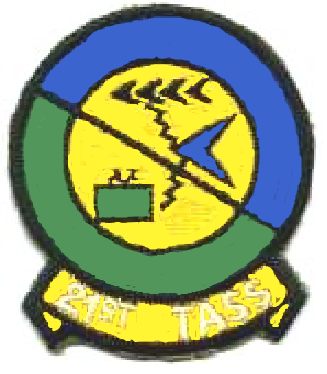
- 21st Tactical Air Support Squadron emblem (1970s)

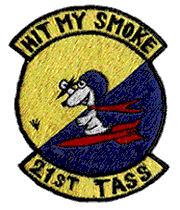
- Patch with unofficial 21st Tactical Air Support Squadron emblem (Vietnam)

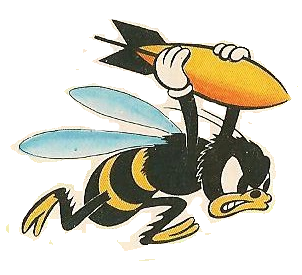
- Unofficial 21st Bombardment Squadron (Heavy) emblem

The Air Education and Training Command Studies and Analysis Squadron is a unit of the United States Air Force stationed at Randolph Air Force Base, Texas, where it reports directly to the headquarters of Air Education and Training Command, evaluating training programs and systems.

The squadron's first two predecessor units served in combat during World War II. The 21st Bombardment Squadron (Heavy) flew Consolidated B-24 Liberators in the Aleutian Campaign, where it participated in one of the earliest direct attacks against Japan. The 21st Bombardment Squadron, Very Heavy flew Boeing B-29 Superfortresses in the strategic bombing campaign against Japan, earning a Distinguished Unit Citation for attacks on the Japanese petroleum industry.

The squadron's other predecessor, the 21st Tactical Air Support Squadron served in combat in the Vietnam War from spring 1965 until the withdrawal of U.S. forces in 1973, earning several combat decorations. One squadron member, Captain Hilliard A. Wilbanks, was awarded the Medal of Honor for actions that helped rescue Vietnamese Rangers that had been ambushed by Viet Cong forces. The squadron served in the tactical air support role in the United States from 1973 through 1991. During this service, the three squadrons were consolidated as a single unit in September 1985.

The squadron assumed its current role in 1992, when, as the 21st Test and Evaluation Squadron, it replaced the 3307th Test and Evaluation Squadron at Randolph.

== Mission ==
The Air Education and Training Command Studies and Analysis Squadron mission is to minimize training costs while meeting Air Force mission goals. It evaluates the long-term impact of changes to training or curriculum of courses offered by Air Education and Training Command (AETC) and predicts Air Force resource requirements for more than five years into the future. It uses analytics to enhance command decision making that impacts numbers or categories of personnel, combining essential modeling, optimization and scheduling environments.

== History ==
=== World War II ===
==== Antisubmarine and Alaskan service ====
The first predecessor of the squadron was activated at March Field, California in January 1941 as the 21st Bombardment Squadron (Heavy), one of the original squadrons of the 30th Bombardment Group. The 21st was equipped with a mix of Douglas B-18 Bolo, Boeing YB-17 Flying Fortress, and Lockheed A-29 Hudson aircraft. In May, the squadron moved to New Orleans Airport, where it continued training as a bomber unit.

When the Japanese attacked Pearl Harbor, the squadron began antisubmarine patrols over the Gulf of Mexico and dispatched a detachment to Savannah Army Air Base, Georgia (Note: Rickard implies that the Savannah detachment conducted the squadron's first mission against submarines.) to hunt for U-boats off the Atlantic Coast. By the end of the month, though, the squadron was patrolling the Pacific Coast with its Hudsons, the 30th Group having returned to March Field after a brief stay at Muroc Army Air Field, California. From May through June 1942, the squadron operated through detachments at McChord Field, Washington and Hamilton Field as well as at civilian airports in Southern California.

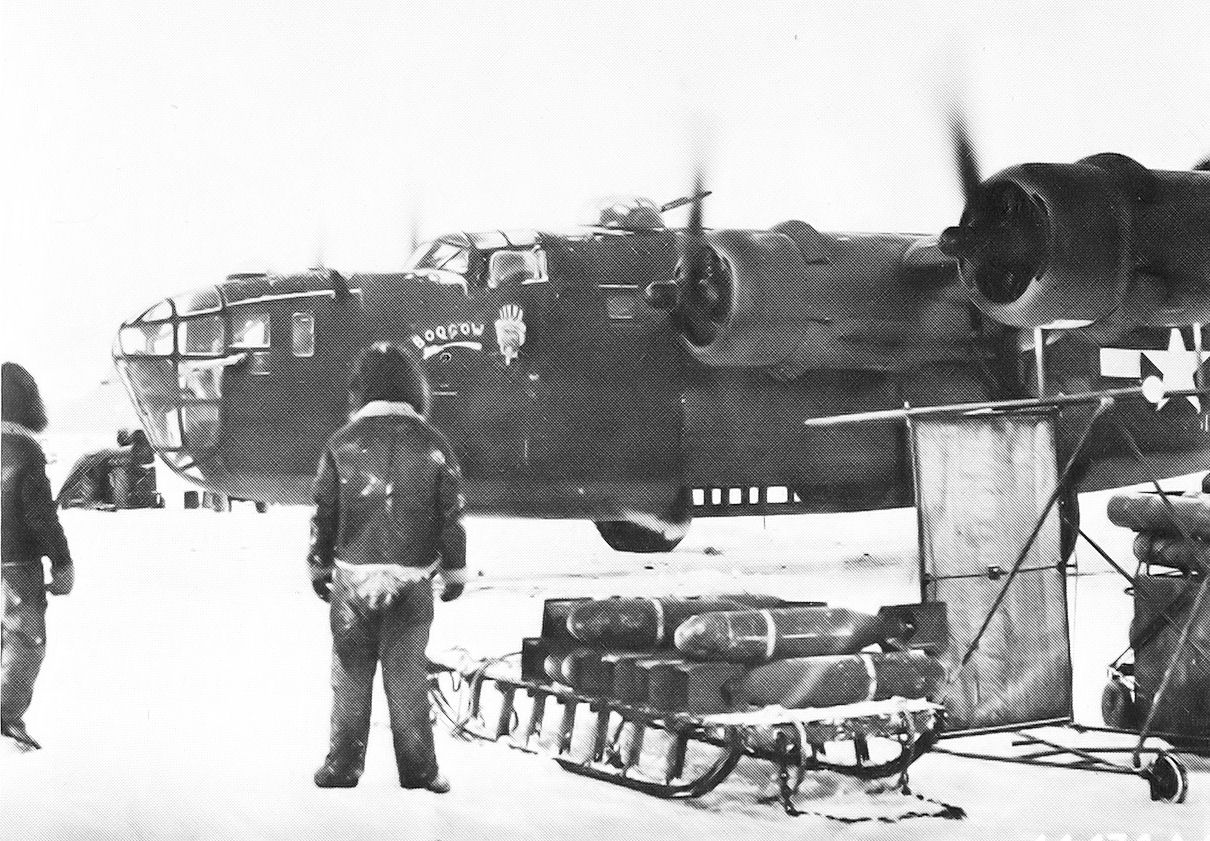
21st Bomb Squadron B-24 Liberator at Amchitka in March 1943

in June 1942, the Japanese attacked Dutch Harbor, Alaska. The squadron's air echelon moved to Fort Glenn Army Air Base, on Umnak Island, Alaska to reinforce the 28th Composite Group in the Aleutian Islands, using the Consolidated B-24 Liberator and the LB-30 model of the Liberator. By September, the rest of the squadron had joined it in Alaska. The squadron frequently operated from advanced bases in the Aleutian Chain. On 14 September, along with the 404th Bombardment Squadron of the 28th Group, it conducted the first raid from Adak Army Air Field, an attack on Japanese naval forces at Kiska. By February 1943, American forces had occupied Amchitka, and the squadron began operating from Amchitka Army Air Field. On 18 July, the squadron provided planes that, along with planes from the 36th and 404th Squadrons, attacked Shimushu and Paramushiru in the Kuril Islands. Although the attack caused little damage, it was the first attack on Japan itself after the Doolittle Raid.

Although the squadron spent fifteen months operating under the control of the 28th Group in Alaska, it remained formally assigned to the 30th Group at March Field. By September 1943, when the Aleutian Campaign had ended and the squadron was released to return to the United States, the 30th Group and its remaining squadrons had departed for the Pacific, and the squadron was disbanded at Smoky Hill Army Air Field, Kansas on 1 November.

==== Strategic bombing of Japan ====
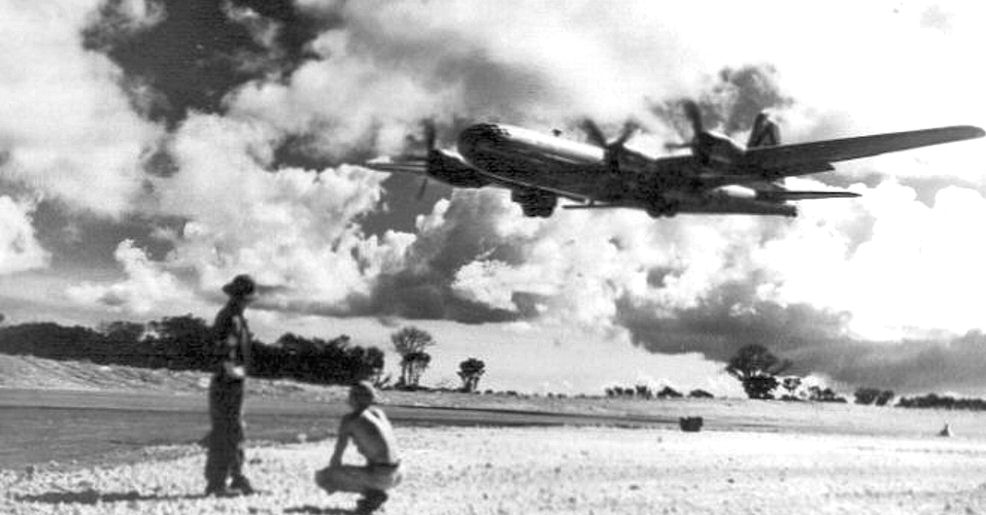
501st Bombardment Group B-29 taking off from Northwest Field Guam

The second predecessor of the squadron was the 21st Bombardment Squadron, Very Heavy, which was activated at Dalhart Army Air Field, Texas as one of the original four squadrons of the 16th Bombardment Group. However, before the squadron could be manned or equipped, groups flying the Boeing B-29 Superfortress were reorganized from four bombardment squadrons with seven aircraft each to three bombardment squadrons with ten aircraft each and the squadron was inactivated on 10 May 1944.

The squadron's inactivation lasted only three weeks, however, and on 1 June it was again activated at Dalhart, this time as a component of the 501st Bombardment Group. In August, the squadron moved to Harvard Army Air Field, Nebraska, where it trained for combat with the Superfortress. It left Harvard in March 1945 after completing its training and arrived at its combat station, Northwest Field, Guam, on 14 April. The squadron flew its first combat mission against Truk Island on 19 June, and eight days later made its first attack on Japan. The unit's missions focused on Japan's petroleum facilities on Honshu. In July 1945, it received a Distinguished Unit Citation for attacks on the Maruzen oil refinery at Shimotso, the Utsobo oil refinery at Yokkaichi and storage facilities at Kawasaki.

After VJ Day, the squadron dropped food and supplies to prisoners of war in Japan, China, Korea and Manchuria. The squadron remained on Guam until it was inactivated in June 1946.

=== Vietnam War ===
The 21st Tactical Air Support Squadron was organized at Pleiku Air Base, South Vietnam on 8 May 1965, as one of three squadrons activated to augment the 19th Tactical Air Support Squadron, which had been operating in the forward air control mission in South Vietnam since 1963. It initially flew Cessna O-1 Bird Dog aircraft in the forward air control mission. However, it was not until August that the squadron became operational. The 21st operated primarily in the II Corps Area, with its aircraft dispersed to support United States Army, ARVN and Korean units. While initially organizing, it directed air strikes during the Battle of Duc Co

The squadron performed visual reconnaissance with light aircraft, flying slowly at low altitude. By patrolling the same area regularly, squadron forward air controllers grew familiar with the terrain and learned to detect changes that could indicate enemy forces hiding below. The controller called in fighter-bombers and marked targets with smoke grenades or white phosphorus rockets. After the attacks, controllers flew low over the target to assess the damage. In September 1966, the 21st moved from the highlands of Pleiku to the coastal base of Nha Trang Air Base.

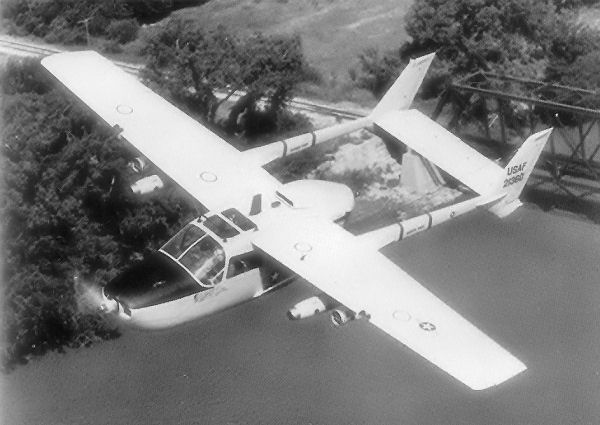
21st Squadron Cessna O-2A

On 27 February 1967, Captain Hilliard A. Wilbanks, one of the squadron's forward air controllers, was flying visual reconnaissance in his Cessna O-1 ahead of a South Vietnamese ranger battalion. He located a well-concealed numerically superior Viet Cong (VC) force poised to ambush the rangers. The enemy immediately fired on his plane and advanced on the ranger force, which was pinned down by devastating fire. Capt. Wilbanks recognized that close air support would not be able to arrive soon enough to help the rangers to withstand the advancing enemy. Flying through withering fire at treetop level, he flew over the VC and inflicted many casualties by firing his rifle out the side window of his Bird Dog. Despite increasingly intense antiaircraft fire, he made repeated low passes over the VC. His tactics interrupted the VC's advance and allowed the rangers to withdraw to safety. During his final attack, Capt. Wilbanks was mortally wounded and his aircraft crashed between the opposing forces. He saved numerous friendly personnel from certain injury or death. For his action that day, he was awarded the Medal of Honor.

The single engine of the O-1 Bird Dog made it particularly vulnerable to ground fire and it lacked radio equipment that would permit it to communicate with ground troops and attacking aircraft at the same time. Its low speed and endurance, in addition to making it more vulnerable, sometimes delayed its arrival in areas of operation and the time it could operate. In 1968, the squadron began equipping with twin engined, faster Cessna O-2 Skymasters that had higher speed, greater endurance and better communications equipment, although the O-1 would not be completely phased out of squadron operations until 1971. The 21st moved to Cam Ranh Bay Air Base, South Vietnam in September 1969, and to Phan Rang Air Base two years later. As the United States withdrew forces from Vietnam, the squadron moved to Tan Son Nhut Air Base in January 1972 and was inactivated there on 21 February 1973. Aircraft losses during the war included 41 O-1s, 16 O-2s and an OV-10, while 29 crewmembers lost their lives in combat.

=== Cold War ===
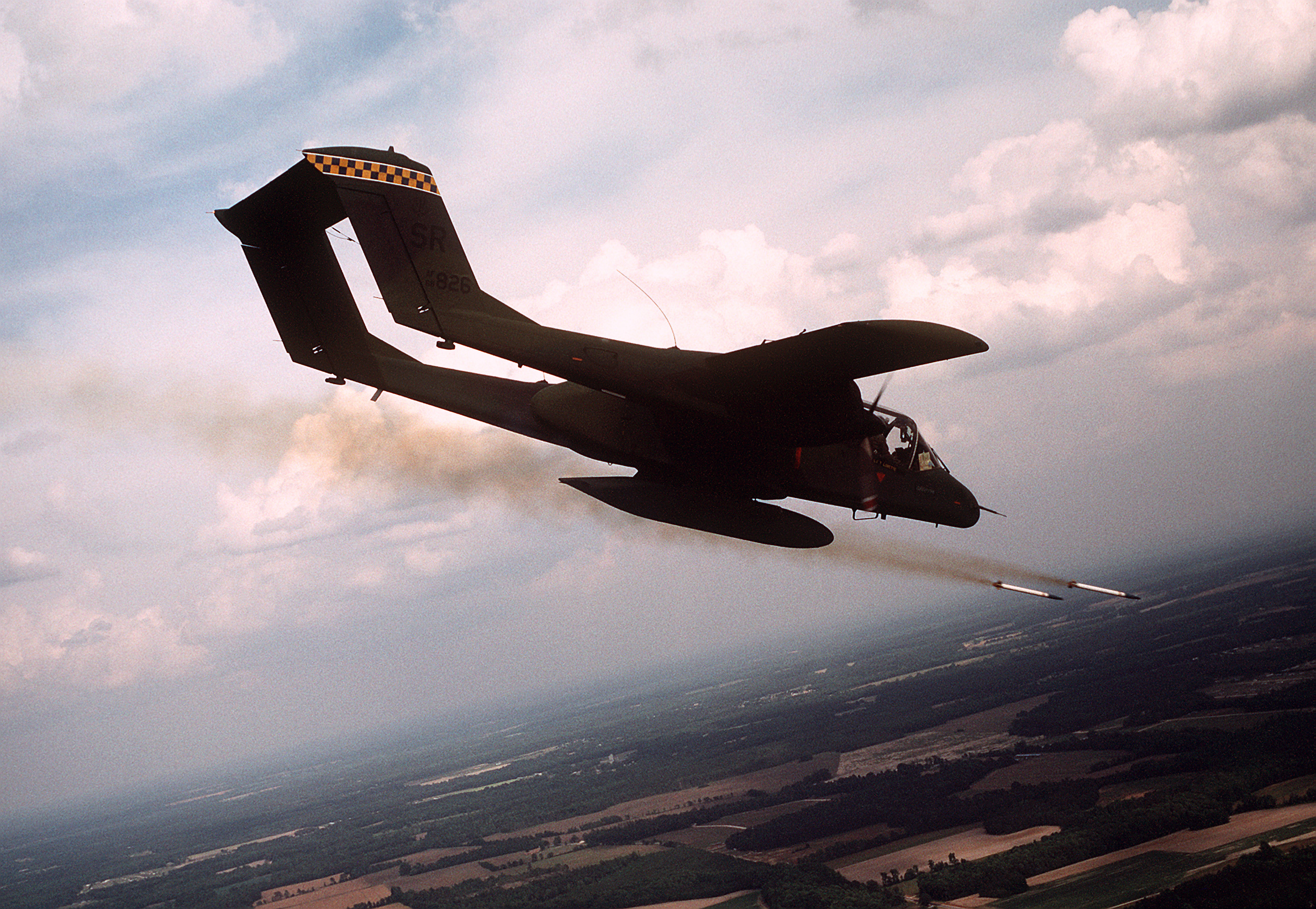
Squadron OV-10 firing rockets during an exercise near Shaw AFB

The squadron was again activated at MacDill Air Force Base, Florida, at the end of August 1973. At MacDill, it was equipped with the Cessna OT-37 Tweet and was assigned to the 68th Tactical Air Support Group, which was located at Shaw Air Force Base, South Carolina. Little less than a year later, on 1 July 1974, it moved to Shaw, where it joined its parent 507th Tactical Air Control Group, which assumed the mission of the 68th Group when the 68th was inactivated in June 1974. At Shaw, the squadron converted from the OT-37 to the OV-10 Bronco in 1988. It re-equipped with the Fairchild Republic OA-10 Thunderbolt II in 1991, shortly before being inactivated and transferring its mission, equipment and personnel to the 21st Tactical Fighter Squadron in November 1991.

=== Testing, evaluation and analysis ===
The squadron was redesignated the 21st Test and Evaluation Squadron and activated on 15 September 1992 at Randolph Air Force Base, where it was assigned to the 12th Operations Group. It absorbed the resources of the 3307th Test and Evaluation Squadron, which had been activated on 15 September 1991 and assigned to the 3300th Training Support Group, and which was simultaneously inactivated. Air Training Command (ATC) had established the 3307th Squadron to perform tests and evaluations of new ATC systems including aircraft, simulators and software to determine if these acquisitions met operational requirements.

The squadron became the Air Education and Training Command Studies and Analysis Flight at the end of March 1994. In April 1997, it added the resources of the 602d Training Support Squadron at Edwards Air Force Base, California, which developed training programs for new weapons systems as they were acquired by the Air Force and became a squadron again. Personnel at Edwards formed Detachment 1 of the squadron. The Edwards detachment later downgraded to Operating Location A in 2003, and its mission and personnel were absorbed by the squadron at Randolph in 2008. The squadron currently includes a technology innovation flight and a strategy analysis flight.

== See also ==
- List of United States Air Force test squadrons
- B-17 Flying Fortress units of the United States Army Air Forces
- B-24 Liberator units of the United States Army Air Forces
