= Lycoming O-580 =

Lycoming O-580 can refer to:

- Lycoming GSO-580, a 1950s era, geared supercharged, eight-cylinder airplane and helicopter engine, including the SO-580 and VSO-580 series.
- Lycoming IO-580, a 1997 direct drive, six-cylinder airplane engine, including the AEIO-580 aerobatic engine.
