= Beechcraft Model 34 =

Prototype American Passenger Aircraft

Model 34 "Twin-Quad"
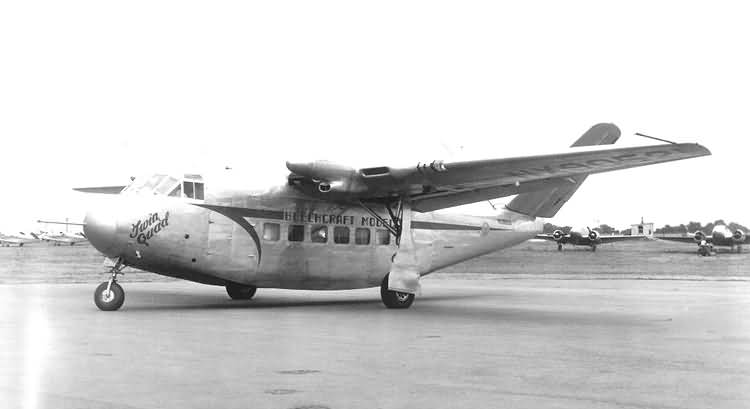

General information
- Type: Civil airliner
- Manufacturer: Beechcraft
- Status: prototype only, scrapped
- Number built: 1 (two prototypes in production scrapped)

History
- First flight: October 1, 1947
- Retired: 1949

The Beechcraft Model 34 "Twin-Quad" was a prototype airliner designed and built by Beechcraft in the period between World War II and the Korean War. At this time many aircraft manufacturers in the United States anticipated a boom in civil aviation and a large number of designs left the drawing board only to ultimately fail. The Model 34 was one of these failures, partly because of its unusual design, and partly because of the thousands of ex-military transport aircraft that were available at the time for a fraction of the price of a new aircraft.

== Design and development ==
The design was a four-engine high-wing monoplane with tricycle undercarriage, originally designed for 14 (three abreast seating with six additional seats mounted on the side) and eventually converted to take 20 passengers. The side "couch seats" were also able to be folded away so that cargo could be carried internally in the cabin. Individual storage space was provided for each passenger seat on the fuselage side above the seat. In order to accommodate a larger cargo load, a cargo hatch was located near the pilot's compartment.

The unusual aspects of the design were the butterfly or V-tail and engine layout that led to its popular nickname, "Twin Quad." The four engines were buried in the wings, with each pair of engines connected to a single propeller via clutches and a common gear box. The engines were horizontally opposed eight-cylinder air-cooled Lycoming GSO-580s (GSO denoting "Geared Supercharged and Opposed", with each engine featuring a built-in reduction gear box in addition to the common propeller gear box). The engines were rated at 400 horsepower at 3,300 rpm. The tail was unusual because unlike the vertical and two horizontal surfaces found on most aircraft, the Twin-Quad's was a two-surface V-tail similar to the tail fitted to Beechcraft's other new product at the time, the Model 35 Bonanza. The V-tail configuration was flight-tested on a twin-engine Beech AT-10.

Another, but more conventional, design aspect was that the belly was made strong enough to sustain minimal damage in the event of a "wheels-up" landing, with built-in integral landing keels or "skids." The wing measured 70 ft (21 m) from tip to tip and the fuselage was 53 ft (16 m) long. With the top of the V-tail almost 18 ft (5.5 m) above the ground and a design maximum takeoff weight (MTOW) of 20,000 lbs, the Model 34 is to date the largest and heaviest Beechcraft civil design, with only the smaller XA-38 Grizzly military aircraft outweighing it.

== Operational history ==
The Model 34 took to the air for the first time on October 1, 1947, with Beech Chief Pilot Vern L. Carstens at the controls. The first flight was uneventful and the initial report from the test pilot was, "We have another outstanding Beechcraft!"

The prototype Model 34 had accumulated more than 200 hours of test flying when the reinforced belly was validated in a wheels-up landing. On January 17, 1949, in a severe forced landing a few miles northwest of the Beech plant shortly after taking off, the sole Beech 34 was damaged beyond repair. An inadvertent cutting off of an emergency master switch when battling an electrical fire had resulted in the shut down of all the powerplants, leading to the crash. The co-pilot was killed and the pilot and two flight observers were injured in the crash.

After the accident, Beech re-evaluated plans to go into series production with the Model 34. At the time, two new prototypes were being manufactured, one for static test and the other to continue the flight test program. One of the main considerations was that the U.S. Civil Aeronautics Board was delaying the licensing of the anticipated "feeder airlines" for which the design was intended. The Beech 34 ultimately could not compete in major and regional airline operations with the thousands of less complex and cheaper war surplus transports, such as the larger Douglas DC-3/C-47 Skytrain, the similarly sized C-60 Lodestar and Beechcraft's own smaller Beechcraft Model 18.

Despite its promise, since the "Twin Quad" had attracted no orders, Beech terminated the project, closing down the production line in January 1949.

== Specifications (Model 34) ==
Data from

General characteristics

- Capacity: 20 passengers
- Length: 53 ft 0 in (16.15 m)
- Wingspan: 70 ft 0 in (21.34 m)
- Height: 17 ft 0 in (5.18 m)
- Gross weight: 19,500 lb (8,845 kg)
- Powerplant: 4 × Lycoming GSO-580 flat-eight piston engine , 375 hp (280 kW) each

Performance

- Maximum speed: 230 mph (370 km/h, 200 kn)
- Range: 1,450 mi (2,335 km, 1,260 nmi)
- Service ceiling: 23,000 ft (7,010 m)

== See also ==
Aircraft of comparable role, configuration, and era

- de Havilland Heron

Related lists

- List of civil aircraft
