= Hilliard A. Wilbanks =

US Air Force Medal of Honor recipient (1933–1967)

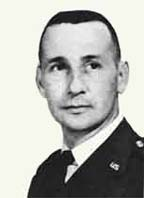
- Captain Hilliard Wilbanks
- Born: July 26, 1933; Cornelia, Georgia, US
- Died: February 24, 1967 (aged 33); Di Linh District, Lam Dong Province, Republic of Vietnam
- Burial place: Fayette Methodist Cemetery, Fayette, Mississippi
- Military career
- Allegiance: United States of America
- Branch: United States Air Force
- Service years: 1950–1967
- Rank: Captain
- Unit: 21st Tactical Air Support Squadron
- Conflicts: Vietnam War (DOW)
- Awards: Medal of Honor; Distinguished Flying Cross; Purple Heart; Air Medal (8)

Hilliard Almond Wilbanks (July 26, 1933 – February 24, 1967) was a career officer and pilot in the United States Air Force during the Vietnam War. He posthumously received the Medal of Honor for sacrificing his life on February 24, 1967, while supporting a unit of the Army of the Republic of Vietnam (ARVN) at Di Linh, near Da Lat, South Vietnam.

== Career ==
Wilbanks joined the Air Force in August 1950, and was an air policeman with the Strategic Air Command during his first four years of service. He was then accepted into the aviation cadet program, and became a commissioned officer in June 1955. After serving as an instructor for a few years, he qualified as a fighter pilot in the early 1960s.

He arrived in Vietnam in April 1966 as a forward air controller (FAC) with the 21st Tactical Air Support Squadron piloting a Cessna O-1E Bird Dog, with a top speed of about 105 mph. FACs were the key link in providing close air support to ground troops fighting in the Vietnam jungle. By February 24, 1967, he had flown 487 combat missions and had earned the Distinguished Flying Cross and eight Air Medals. He was within two months of returning home.

Late in the afternoon of the 24 February, Wilbanks was in the air above the Central Highlands, flying reconnaissance for an ARVN Ranger Battalion. He discovered Viet Cong units concealed on two hilltops. The Rangers were on foot, making their way through a tea plantation that gave them little or no cover. They were walking into an ambush.

As Wilbanks flew his O-1E on a low-level sweep of the area, he radioed a warning to the Rangers. The enemy troops, seeing his plane, knew their ambush was being compromised, so they reacted with a barrage from mortars, machine guns and automatic weapons. Wilbanks flew through the heavy fire as he marked the area with white phosphorus rockets. The Viet Cong, knowing that fighters would soon be coming, charged down the slopes toward the outnumbered Rangers.

Wilbanks watched the drama from above and realized the fighters would not arrive in time before the Rangers were overrun. Diving toward the advancing troops, Wilbanks fired his remaining phosphorus rockets. The line momentarily stopped, but the Viet Cong knew he had no more rockets. They began their advance again. The fighters had still not arrived. Wilbanks had one more weapon, an M16 rifle. Grabbing his rifle, he began a series of strafing runs at about 100 feet (30 m), firing it through the side window and reloading between passes. He managed to distract the enemy troops and momentarily slowed their advance. The Viet Cong diverted their fire against the low-flying O-1E. On his third pass, Wilbanks was severely wounded and crashed in the battle area. An Army Ranger ran to his plane and pulled the unconscious Wilbanks from the wreckage. A flight of F-4s strafed the enemy while a helicopter picked up the wounded Wilbanks. He died while being evacuated to a hospital.

== Awards and decorations ==

USAF Senior pilot badge
Medal of Honor		Distinguished Flying Cross
Purple Heart	Air Medal with one silver and two bronze oak leaf clusters	Air Force Commendation Medal
Air Force Outstanding Unit Award	Army Good Conduct Medal	National Defense Service Medal with service star
Vietnam Service Medal	Air Force Longevity Service Award with three bronze oak leaf clusters	Armed Forces Reserve Medal
Small Arms Expert Marksmanship Ribbon	Republic of Vietnam Gallantry Cross Unit Citation	Republic of Vietnam Campaign Medal

=== Medal of Honor citation ===
Citation:

For conspicuous gallantry and intrepidity in action at the risk of his life above and beyond the call of duty. As a forward air controller Capt. Wilbanks was pilot of an unarmed, light aircraft flying visual reconnaissance ahead of a South Vietnam Army Ranger Battalion. His intensive search revealed a well-concealed and numerically superior hostile force poised to ambush the advancing rangers. The Viet Cong, realizing that Capt. Wilbanks' discovery had compromised their position and ability to launch a surprise attack, immediately fired on the small aircraft with all available firepower. The enemy then began advancing against the exposed forward elements of the ranger force which were pinned down by devastating fire. Capt. Wilbanks recognized that close support aircraft could not arrive in time to enable the rangers to withstand the advancing enemy onslaught. With full knowledge of the limitations of his unarmed, unarmored, light reconnaissance aircraft, and the great danger imposed by the enemy's vast firepower, he unhesitatingly assumed a covering, close support role. Flying through a hail of withering fire at treetop level, Capt. Wilbanks passed directly over the advancing enemy and inflicted many casualties by firing his rifle out of the side window of his aircraft. Despite increasingly intense antiaircraft fire, Capt. Wilbanks continued to completely disregard his own safety and made repeated low passes over the enemy to divert their fire away from the rangers. His daring tactics successfully interrupted the enemy advance, allowing the rangers to withdraw to safety from their perilous position. During his final courageous attack to protect the withdrawing forces, Capt. Wilbanks was mortally wounded and his bullet-riddled aircraft crashed between the opposing forces. Capt. Wilbanks' magnificent action saved numerous friendly personnel from certain injury or death. His unparalleled concern for his fellow man and his extraordinary heroism were in the highest traditions of the military service, and have reflected great credit upon himself and the U.S. Air Force.

=== Legacy ===
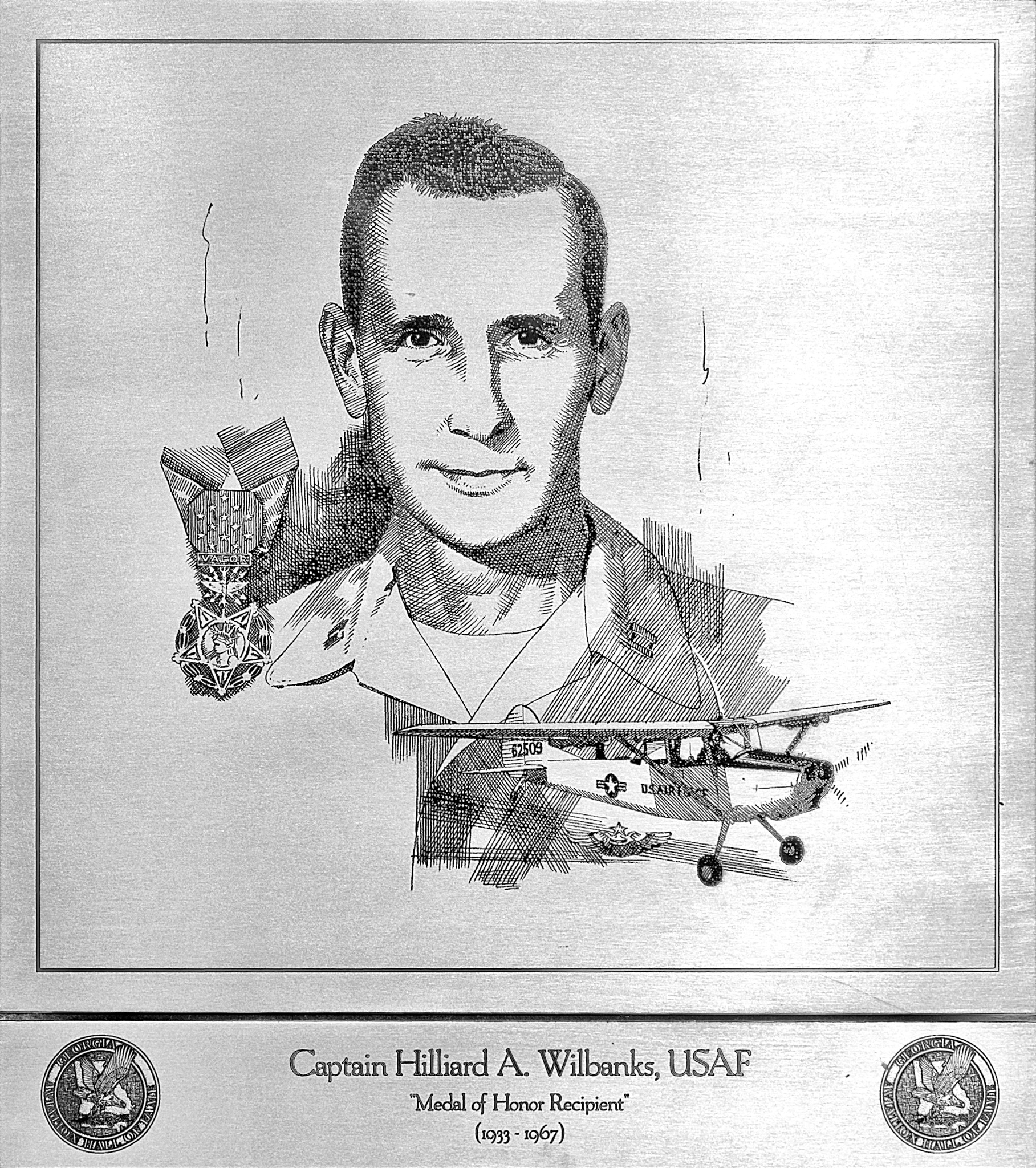
Plaque of Wilbanks at the Georgia Aviation Hall of Fame

Wilbanks, aged 33 at his death, was buried in Fayette Methodist Cemetery in Fayette, Mississippi.

On January 24, 1968, United States Secretary of the Air Force Harold Brown presented the Medal of Honor to Wilbanks' widow at The Pentagon in Arlington County, Virginia.

Wilbanks is a member of the Georgia Aviation Hall of Fame.

A six-foot (180 cm) tall, two-sided black granite memorial was erected in Cornelia, Georgia, about 400 yards (370 m) from where he was born.

Hilliard A. Wilbanks Middle School in Demorest, Georgia was named for him, as was its "Patriot" mascot and team name.

== See also ==
- List of Medal of Honor recipients
- List of Medal of Honor recipients for the Vietnam War
