= Cessna 308 =

American light aircraft prototype

General information
- Type: Military light transport
- National origin: United States
- Manufacturer: Cessna
- Primary user: United States Army
- Number built: 1

History
- First flight: July 1951
- Developed from: Cessna O-1 Bird Dog

The Cessna 308 was a prototype military light transport aircraft based on the successful O-1 Bird Dog (Cessna 305) observation aircraft. Only one aircraft was completed, and the project did not proceed further due to a lack of orders.

== Development ==
The Cessna 308 was conceived as an enlarged model 305 that would carry four people for the military light transport role and was developed in response to a US Army requirement.

The resulting design was first flown in July 1951. While the aircraft was based on the model 305, it incorporated a four-place cabin similar to the then current production Cessna 170. The prototype was powered by a Lycoming GSO-580 geared, supercharged, eight-cylinder engine, producing 375 hp (280 kW). The prototype featured a 47 ft (14 m) wingspan, taildragger landing gear and a 4,200 lb (1,905 kg) gross take-off weight. In trials the 308 proved capable of operating from rough fields carrying a 1,000 lb (454 kg) payload, with a range of 695 nmi (1,287 km).

The US Army chose the de Havilland Canada DHC-2 Beaver for the intended light transport role putting it into service as the L-20A. As a result, development of the Cessna 308 was not continued beyond the completion of a single prototype.

== Specifications (Cessna 308 prototype) ==
Data from The Cessnas that got away

General characteristics

- Crew: 1
- Capacity:
  - 3 passengers
  - 1,000 lb (450 kg) cargo
- Wingspan: 47 ft 0 in (14.33 m)
- Gross weight: 4,200 lb (1,905 kg)
- Powerplant: 1 × Lycoming GSO-580 , 375 hp (280 kW)

Performance

- Range: 800 mi (1,287 km, 695 nmi)
