= Cessna O-1 Bird Dog =

Military liaison and observation aircraft

O-1 Bird Dog L-19 / OE
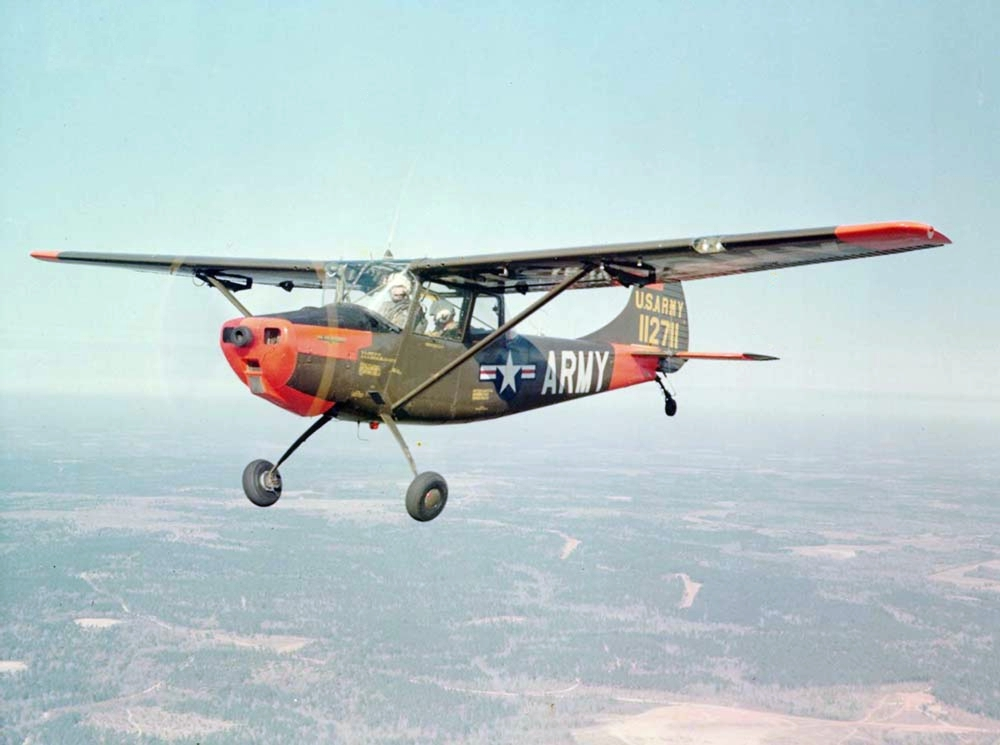
- An O-1A Bird Dog

General information
- Type: Observation aircraft
- National origin: United States
- Manufacturer: Cessna
- Status: Active as warbirds and with civilian pilots
- Primary users: United States Army United States Air Force; United States Marine Corps; Royal Thai Air Force
- Number built: 3,431

History
- Manufactured: 1950–1959
- Introduction date: 1950
- First flight: 14 December 1949
- Retired: 1974 (U.S.)
- Developed from: Cessna 170
- Variant: Cessna 308
- Developed into: SIAI-Marchetti SM.1019

The Cessna O-1 Bird Dog is a liaison and observation aircraft that first flew on December 14, 1949, and entered service in 1950 as the L-19 in the Korean War. It went on to serve in many branches of the U.S. Armed Forces, was not retired until the 1970s in a number of variants, and also served in the Vietnam War. It was also called the OE-1 and OE-2 in Navy service, flying with the Marine Corps, and in the 1960s, it was redesignated the O-1. It remains a civilian-flown warbird aircraft, and several examples are in aviation museums. It was the first all-metal, fixed-wing aircraft ordered for and by the United States Army following the Army Air Forces' separation from it in 1947. The Bird Dog had a lengthy career in the U.S. military and in other countries, with over 4000 produced.

It was further developed into a turboprop-powered version in the 1970s, the SIAI-Marchetti SM.1019. An experimental variant was the Cessna 308, a one-off to explore the possibility of a four-person liaison version.

== Design and development ==
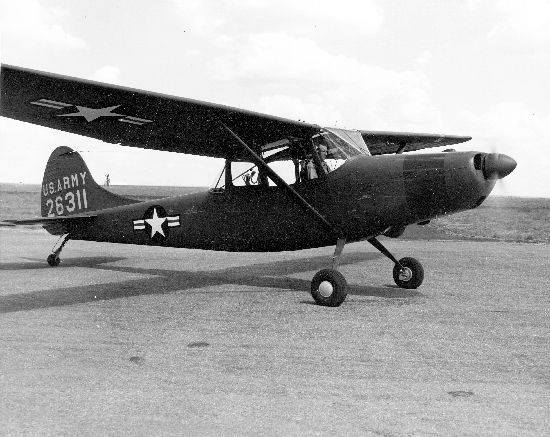
Cessna XL-19C Bird Dog

The U.S. Army was searching for an aircraft that could fly over enemy locations to collect information related to artillery fire target locations and distances, as well as perform liaison duties, and preferably be constructed of all metal, as the fabric-covered liaison aircraft used during World War II (primarily Stinson and Piper products) had short service lives. After the specification for a two-seat liaison and observation monoplane was issued, the Cessna Aircraft Company submitted the Cessna Model 305A, a development of the Cessna 170. The Cessna 305A was a single-engined, lightweight, strut-braced, high-wing monoplane with a tailwheel landing gear.

The greatest difference from the Cessna 170 was that the 305A had only two seats in tandem configuration (the largest tandem-seat aircraft Cessna ever produced), with angled side windows to improve ground observation. Other differences included a redesigned rear fuselage, providing a view directly to the rear (a feature later dubbed "Omni-View", carried over to Cessna single-engined aircraft after 1964), and transparent panels in the wings' center section over the cockpit (similar to those found on the Cessna 140 and the later Cessna 150 Aerobat model), which allowed the pilot to look directly overhead. A wider door was fitted to allow a stretcher to be loaded.

The Army held a competition in April 1950 for the contract, with contenders from Cessna, Piper, Taylorcraft, and Temco. Cessna's entry was selected for service.

The U.S. Army awarded a contract to Cessna for 418 of the aircraft, which was designated the L-19A Bird Dog. The prototype Cessna 305 (registration N41694) first flew on 14 December 1949, and it now resides in the Spirit of Flight Center in Erie, Colorado. Deliveries began in December 1950, and the aircraft were soon in use fighting their first war in Korea from 1950 through 1953. An instrument trainer variant was developed in 1953, later versions had constant-speed propellers, and the final version, the L-19E, had a larger gross weight.

Around 1950, U.S. Air Force (USAF) orders for 60 L-19A aircraft were diverted to the United States Marine Corps (USMC), which designated it OE-1 under the 1922 United States Navy aircraft designation system, took delivery from 1951 to 1953, and deployed the aircraft in Korea. In 1959, two L-19E aircraft transferred from the U.S. Army to the USMC were also designated OE-1. The USMC issued a requirement for a larger and faster version, prompting Cessna to adapt Cessna 180 wings and a more powerful 260 hp (190 kW) Continental O-470-2 engine to the aircraft, which was designated OE-2; 27 of these improved aircraft were delivered, but the sharp price increase dissuaded the USMC from future orders.

Cessna produced 3,431 aircraft; it was also built under license by Fuji in Japan. Initially, 2,486 were produced between 1950 and 1954, an additional 945 were produced through 1958, and 60 more were produced in Japan.

The L-19 received the name Bird Dog as a result of a contest held with Cessna employees to name the aircraft. The winning entry, submitted by Jack A. Swayze, an industrial photographer, was selected by a U.S. Army board. The name was chosen because the role of the Army's new aircraft was to find the enemy and orbit overhead until artillery (or attack aircraft) could be brought to bear on the enemy. While flying low and close to the battlefield, the pilot would observe the exploding shells and adjust the fire via his radios, in the manner of a bird dog (gun dog) used by game hunters.

== Operational history ==
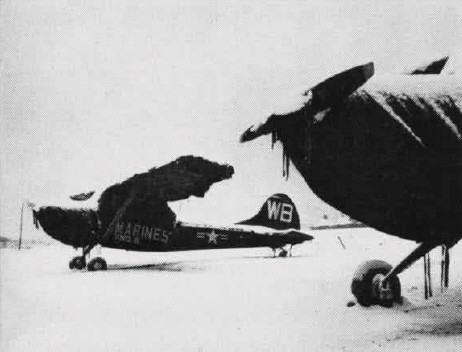
USMC OE-1s of VMO-6 during the winter of 1951/52 in Korea

=== Military service ===
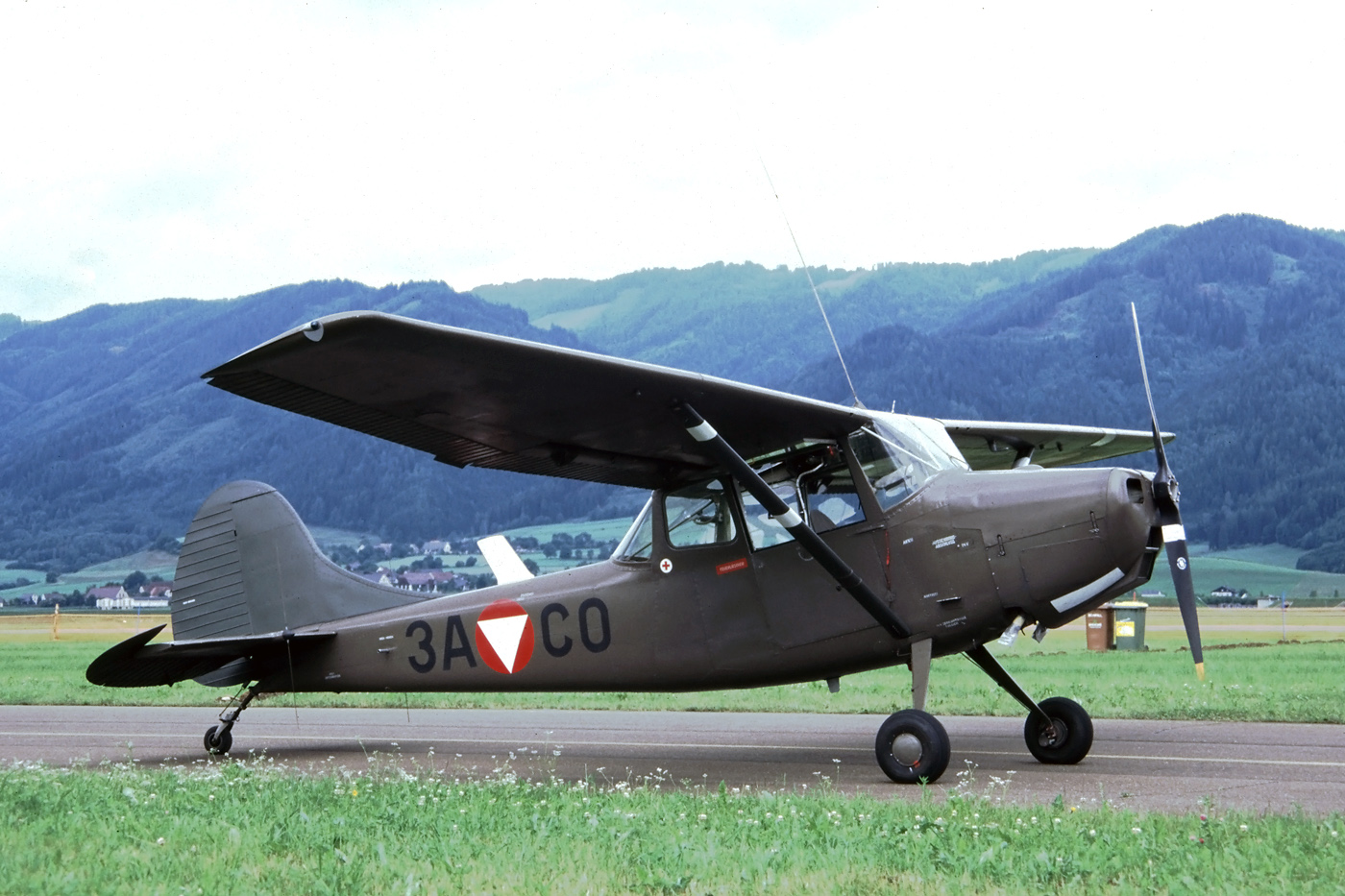
An Austrian Luftwaffe L-19 is shown here in 1997;it was retired the next year.

The United States Department of Defense (DOD) ordered 3,200 L-19s that were built between 1950 and 1959, entering both the U.S. Army (USA) and USMC inventories. The aircraft were used in various utility roles, such as artillery spotting, front-line communications, medical evacuation, and training.

In U.S. service, the L-19 replaced the Piper L–4 Grasshoppers and Stinson L–5 Sentinels.

With the adoption of the 1962 United States Tri-Service aircraft designation system, the USA L-19s and USMC OEs were redesignated as O-1 Bird Dogs, and they soon entered the Vietnam War. During the early 1960s, the Bird Dog was flown by the Republic of Vietnam Air Force (RVNAF), USA, and USMC in South Vietnam and later by clandestine forward air controllers (FACs, e.g., Ravens) in Laos and Cambodia. Because of its short takeoff and landing (STOL) and low-altitude/low-airspeed capabilities, the O-1 also later found its way into USAF service as FAC aircraft for vectoring faster fighter and attack aircraft and supporting combat search-and-rescue operations recovering downed aircrews.

During the Vietnam War, the Bird Dog was used primarily for reconnaissance, target acquisition, artillery adjustment, radio relay, convoy escort, and the FAC of tactical aircraft, including bombers operating in a tactical role.

Supplementing the O-1, then gradually replacing it, the USAF switched to the Cessna O-2 Skymaster and North American OV-10 Bronco, while the USMC took delivery of the OV-10 to replace its aging O-1s. Both were faster, twin-engined aircraft, with the OV-10 being a turboprop aircraft. Still, the USA retained the Bird Dog throughout the war, with up to 11 reconnaissance airplane companies deployed to cover all of South Vietnam, the Vietnamese Demilitarized Zone, and the southern edge of North Vietnam. Its quieter noise level, lower speed, tighter maneuverability, STOL ability, and better visibility (even to the rear) kept it highly valued by the ground units it supported and highly feared by enemy units over which it flew. The last U.S. Army O-1 Bird Dog was officially retired in 1974.

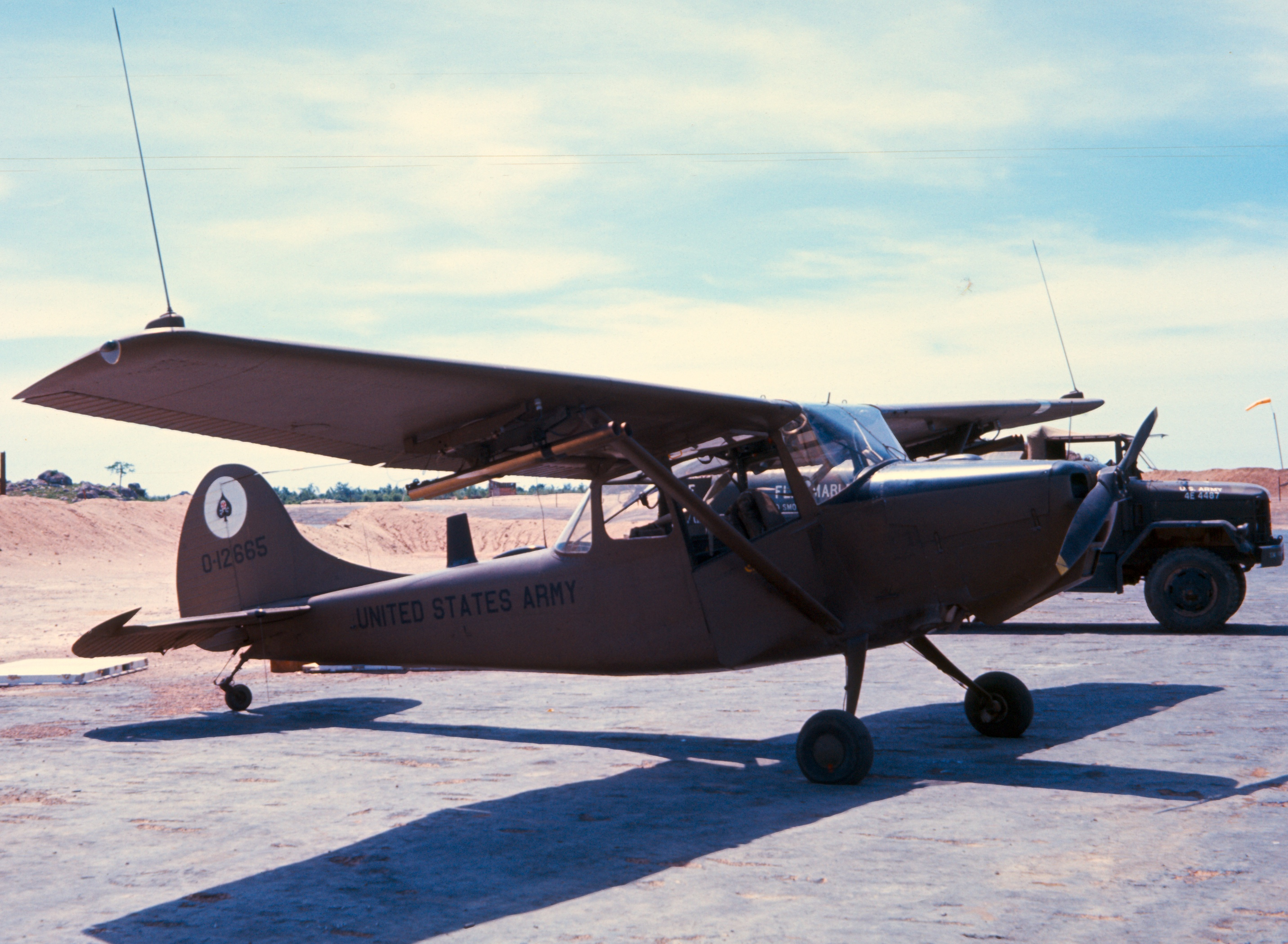
A U.S. Army L-19 (O-1) of the 21st Reconnaissance Airplane Company, with a fuel tanker at LZ Baldy, near Hoi An, the Republic of Vietnam, late 1967 or early 1968

During the Vietnam War, 469 O-1 Bird Dogs were lost to all causes. The USAF lost 178, the USMC lost seven, and 284 were lost from the USA, RVNAF, and clandestine operators. Three Bird Dogs were lost to enemy hand-held surface-to-air missiles.

Two O-1 Bird Dogs were lent to the Australian Army's 161 Reconnaissance Flight operating out of Nui Dat in Phuoc Tuy Province. One was lost to ground fire in May 1968, killing 161's commanding officer. Another Bird Dog was built by this unit's maintenance crew, using aircraft sections salvaged from dumps around Vietnam. It was test-flown and later smuggled back to Australia in pieces, contained in crates marked as "aircraft spares". This aircraft now resides in the Museum of Army Flying at the Army Aviation Center at Oakey, Queensland.

As the USAF phased out the O-1 in favor of the O-2 and OV-10, many O-1s in the United States were sold as surplus. During the 1970s and 1980s, Ector Aircraft remanufactured many as the Ector Mountaineer, with their original powerplants, and as the Ector Super Mountaineer, with the Lycoming O-540-A4B5.

In United States Service, it was mostly replaced by the O-2 Skymaster and OV-10 Bronco, although it lingered in many roles due to unique advantages.

=== Civil Air Patrol service ===
In the early 1970s, as the O-2 Skymaster and OV-10 Bronco replaced the O-1 in frontline USAF service, several former USAF O-1s were turned over to the USAF's civilian auxiliary, the Civil Air Patrol (CAP), for duties such as aerial search in support of domestic search-and-rescue operations. However, since very few CAP pilots had prior training and experience as professional military aviators and/or significant experience with tailwheel aircraft, many CAP O-1 aircraft were damaged in ground loops and other takeoff, landing, or taxiing mishaps.

To reduce both risk and repair costs, the USAF directed CAP that all O-1 aircraft in CAP service be eventually replaced for safety reasons by single-engined, tricycle-gear, civilian Cessnas common to general aviation, primarily Cessna 172 and Cessna 182 aircraft. The only O-1 remaining in the CAP inventory is a permanent static display aircraft on a pylon in front of CAP headquarters at Maxwell Air Force Base, Alabama.

=== Civilian use ===
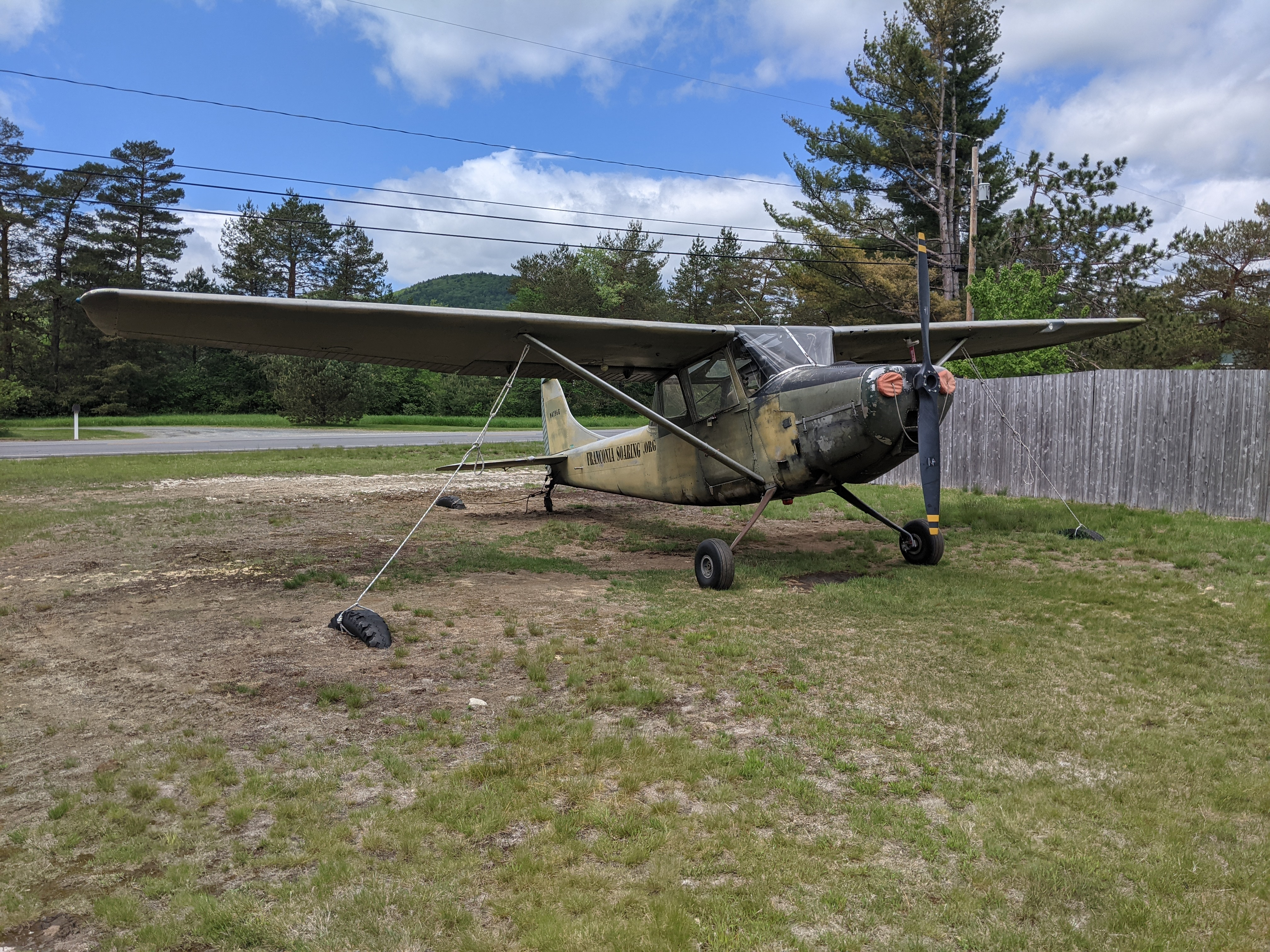
A civilian L-19 used to launch gliders (shown in 2021)

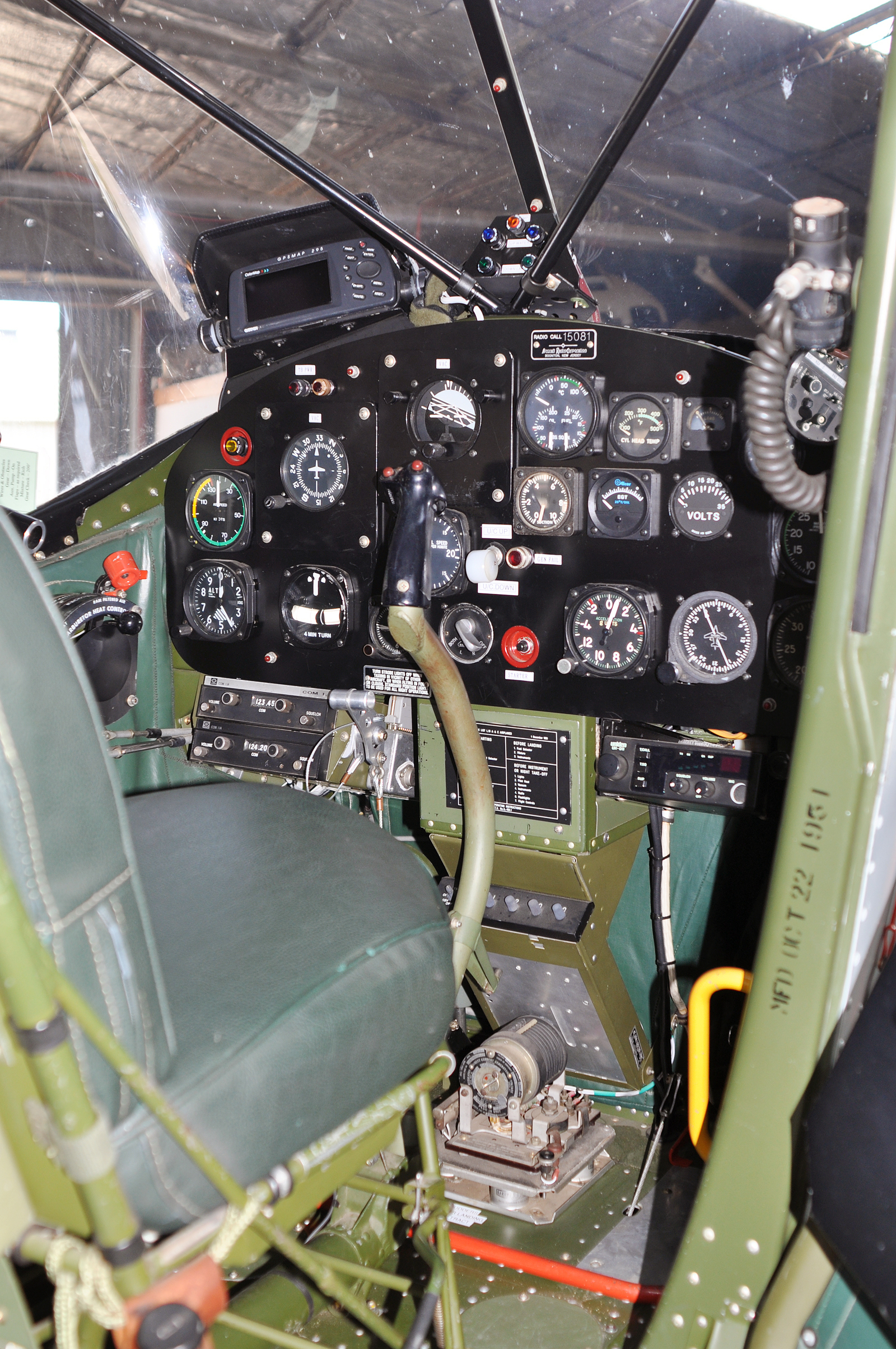
Cockpit of O-1A Bird Dog (2011)

Many former USAF and former CAP O-1 and L-19 aircraft were sold to private owners as recreational aircraft, and others went to glider clubs in the U.S. as a reliable and robust vehicle to tow gliders into the air. As with most aircraft used for glider towing, the aircraft has also been outfitted with mirrors mounted to the struts. Others went to museums, where they are usually displayed in their military combat markings.

In Canada, the Royal Canadian Air Cadets use former CAF L-19 aircraft equipped with a towing rig to tow their Schweizer 2-33A gliders for the Air Cadet gliding program. These particular L-19 variants are used in the Atlantic, Eastern, and Pacific regions. They have been modified for noise reduction using a smaller-diameter, four-blade Hoffman composite propeller in all regions, except the Pacific region, and exhaust modification. The fuel-delivery system has also been modified from the original design, placing the fuel-selector valve closer to the pilot. The L-19/O-1 is a popular warbird with private pilots.

In the U.S., the Franconia Soaring Association in Franconia, New Hampshire, uses an O-1, tail number N4796G, to tow its gliders, including Schweizer SGS 1-26 gliders and Grob G103 Twin Astir and Pilatus B4-PC11 sailplanes, as of July 2012.

As of June 2009, more than 330 were registered with the US Federal Aviation Administration. Others are owned and operated outside the U.S. by individuals and flying organizations.

== Notable flights ==
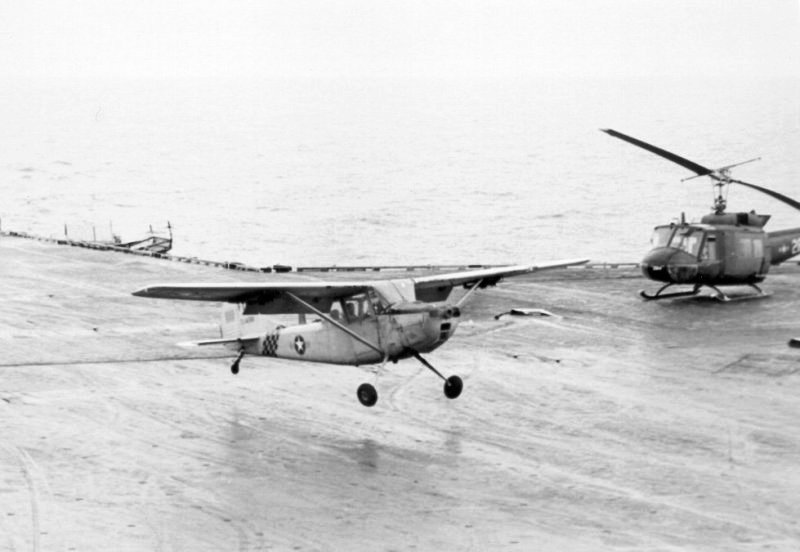
Major Bung of the Republic of Vietnam Air Force lands his O-1 aboard USS Midway during Operation Frequent Wind, 1975

American television personality and actor Ed McMahon was a USMC aviator who piloted an OE during the Korean War, flying 85 combat missions and earning six Air Medals in 1953.

Captain Sidney Harrison, U.S. Army, a decorated veteran of World War II and the Korean War, crashed his Cessna O-1 on a flight from Wichita, Kansas, to Buckley Air Force Base, Colorado, in 1952. The wreckage is still in the woods above Palmer Lake, Colorado, and can be reached by an 11.1-mile (17.9 km) hike.

Captain Hilliard A. Wilbanks, USAF, posthumously received the Medal of Honor for sacrificing his life on February 24, 1967, while supporting an ARVN Ranger Battalion at Di Linh, near Da Lat, South Vietnam. After knowing their ambush had been compromised and fighter support would soon come, the Viet Cong charged into the Rangers. Trying to slow them down, Wilbanks shot the rest of his phosphorus rockets at the enemy. After he ran out of rockets, he made strafing passes, firing his M16 rifle from the side window of the plane. After the third pass, he was wounded and crashed, and died while being evacuated by helicopter.

On 29 April 1975, the day before the fall of Saigon during the Vietnam War, Republic of Vietnam Air Force Major Bung-Ly loaded his wife and five children into a two-seat Cessna O-1 Bird Dog and took off from Con Son Island. After evading enemy ground fire, Major Bung-Ly headed out to sea and spotted the aircraft carrier Midway. With only an hour of fuel remaining, he dropped a note asking that the deck be cleared so he could land. As no other way existed to make room, Midway's commanding officer, Captain (later Rear Admiral) Lawrence Chambers, ordered US$10 million worth of South Vietnamese Bell UH-1 Iroquois ("Huey") helicopters to be pushed overboard into the South China Sea. The Bird Dog that Major Bung-Ly landed aboard Midway is now on display at the National Naval Aviation Museum at Naval Air Station Pensacola, Florida. A similar aircraft was restored in the markings of the aircraft flown by Major Bung-Ly for an exhibit at the USS Midway Museum in San Diego, California.

== Variants ==
An O-1A Bird Dog on display at the Steven F. Udvar-Hazy Center in Chantilly, Virginia

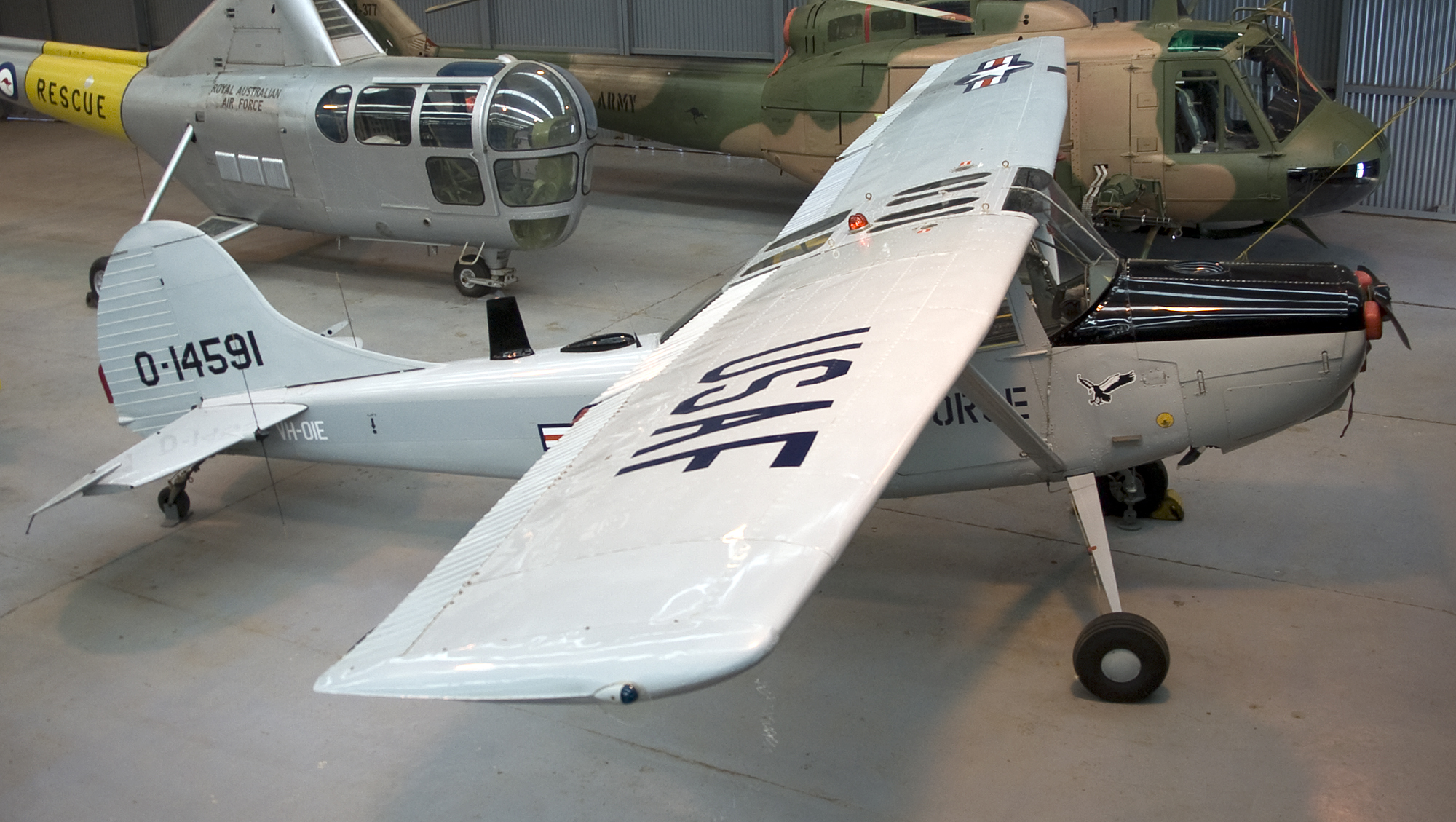
USAF O-1F on display at the RAAF Museum

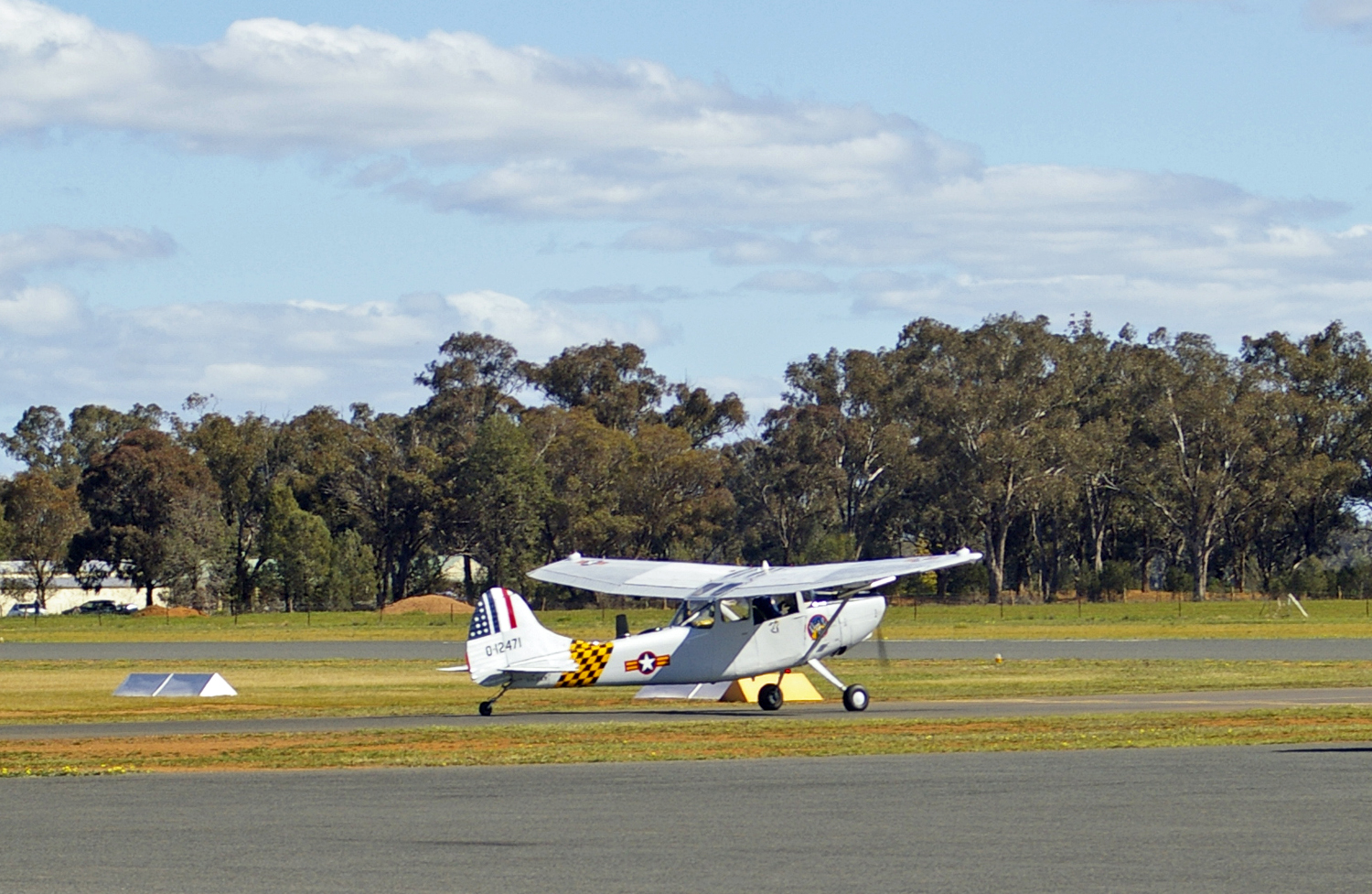
O-1G Bird Dog (305D)

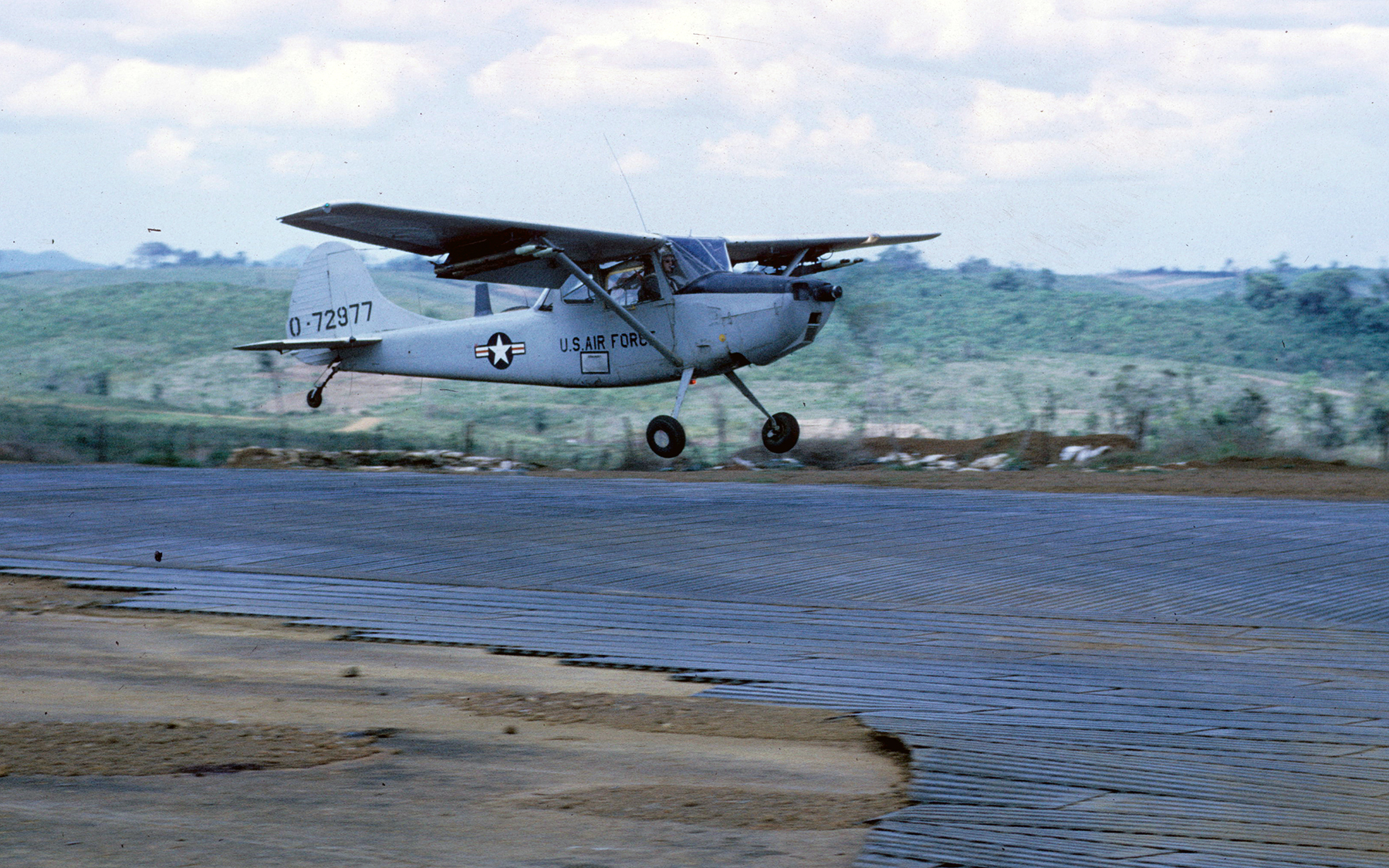
A US O-1F taking off in 1968

L-19A (Cessna 305A)
Initial production version for the USA with 213 hp (159 kW) Continental O-470-11, redesignated O-1A in 1962 2,486 built
L-19-IT
L-19A converted to instrument trained, 66 converted
TL-19A
L-19As converted to dual control trainers, redesignated TO-1A in 1962
XL-19B
L-19A with a 210 shp (160 kW) Boeing XT-50-BO-1 turboprop engine, one built.
XL-19C
L-19A with a 210 shp (160 kW) Continental CAE XT51-T-1 turboprop engine, two built
TL-19D (Cessna 305B)
Instrument trainer with dual controls and powered by 210 hp (160 kW) Continental O-470-15, redesignated TO-1D in 1962, 310 built
L-19E (Cessna 305C)
Improved version with strengthened airframe and powered by Continental O-470-15, became O-1E in 1962. 469 built
L-19L (Cessna 182D)
Military variant of the Cessna 182D for the Canadian Army, four built, all nearly identical to the civilian 182D
OE-1
60 L-19As and two L-19Es delivered to USMC, redesignated O-1B in 1962
OE-2 (Cessna 321)
Redesigned version for USMC with Cessna 180 wings, 260 hp (190 kW) Continental O-470-2 and modified fuselage, became O-1C in 1962, 27 built
O-1A
L-19A redesignated in 1962
TO-1A
Redesignation of TL-19A
O-1B
OE-1 redesignated in 1962
O-1C
OE-2 redesignated in 1962
O-1D
A number of TO-1Ds converted for FAC duties with the USAF
TO-1D
TL-19D redesignated in 1962.
O-1E
L-19E redesignated in 1962.
O-1F (Cessna 305E)
FAC conversions of the O-1D for the USAF
O-1G (Cessna 305D)
FAC conversions of the O-1A for the USAF
CO-119
SIAI-Marchetti SM.1019
Turboprop variant for the Italian Army
Cessna 325
Agricultural variant of the Model 305 with spraybars and a hopper in an enclosed rear cockpit, four built
B.T.2
(Thai: บ.ต.๒) Thai designation for the O-1A, O-1E, and O-1G

== Operators ==
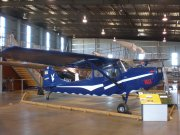
The Australian Army's sole L-19A was 51-4883 Bunny 2, acquired and operated unofficially in Vietnam, is displayed at the Australian Army Aviation Museum, Oakey (2007)

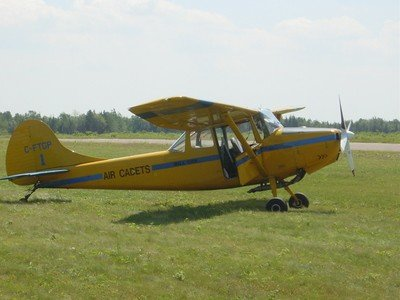
This L-19E was used by the Royal Canadian Air Cadets in the Atlantic region of Canada, with four-blade propeller and exhaust modifications visible

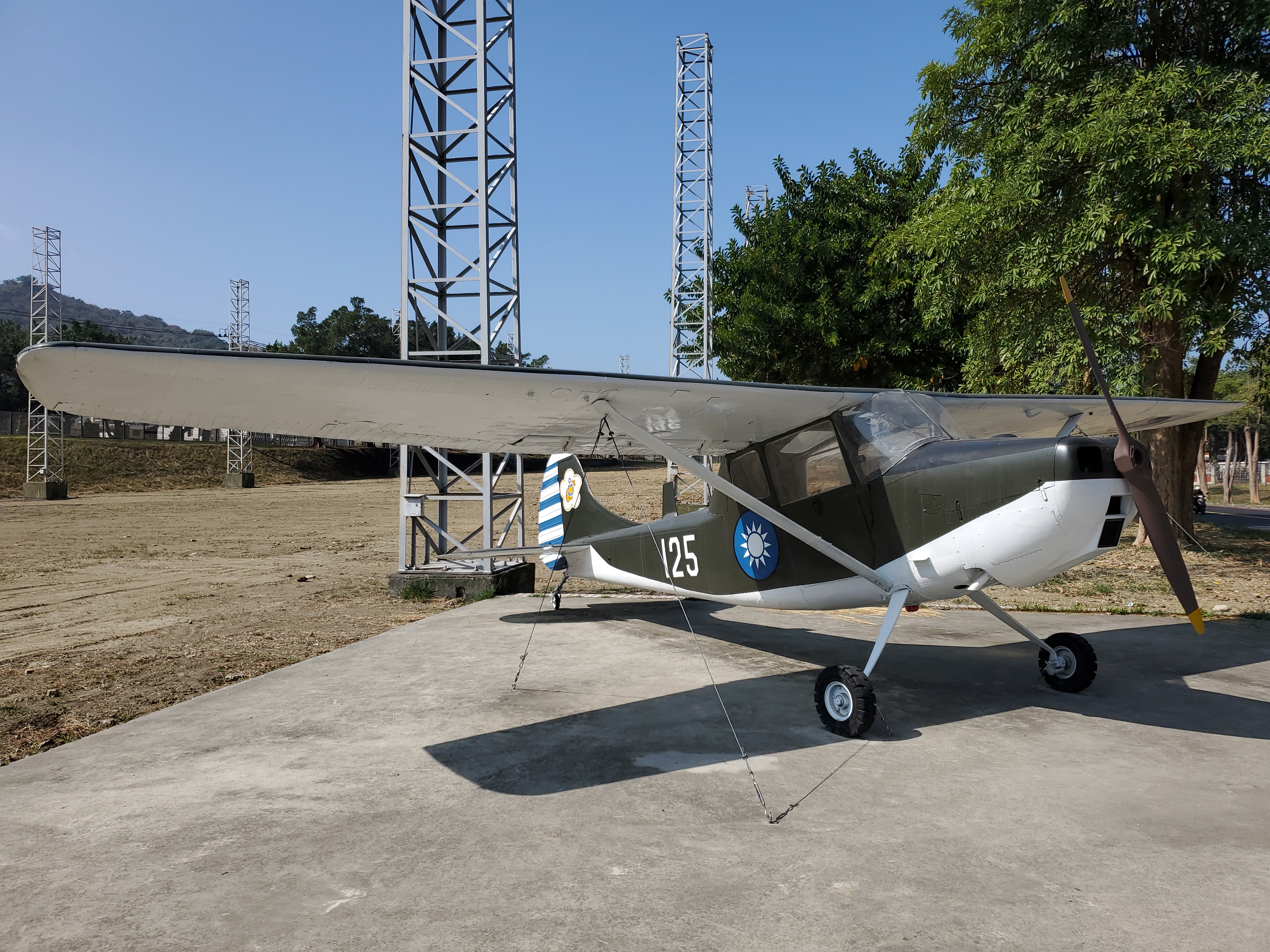
ROCMC OE-1 in the Museum of Republic of China Marine Corps

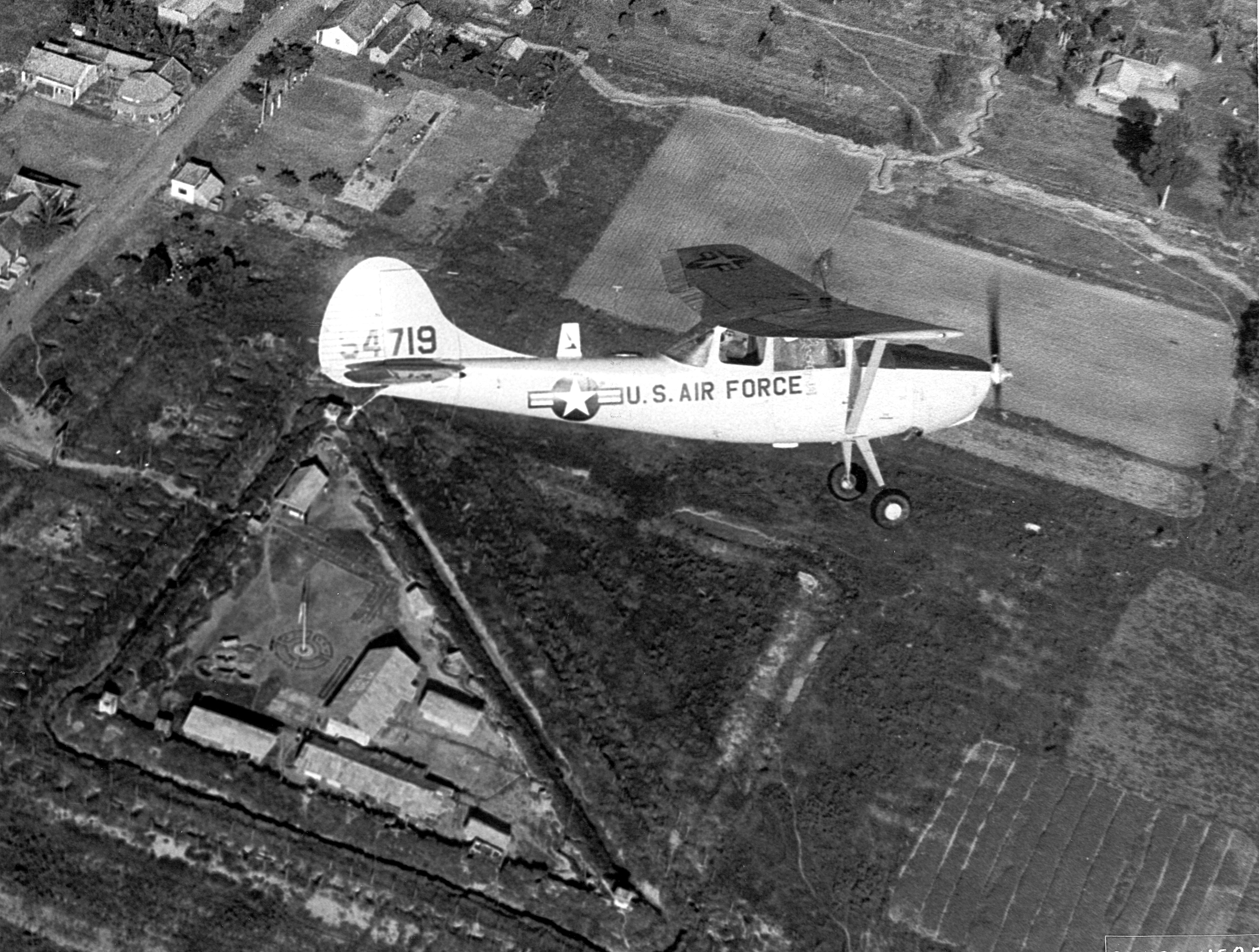
Forward Air Controller O-1E "Bird Dog" in reconnaissance near Special Forces camp in Vietnam

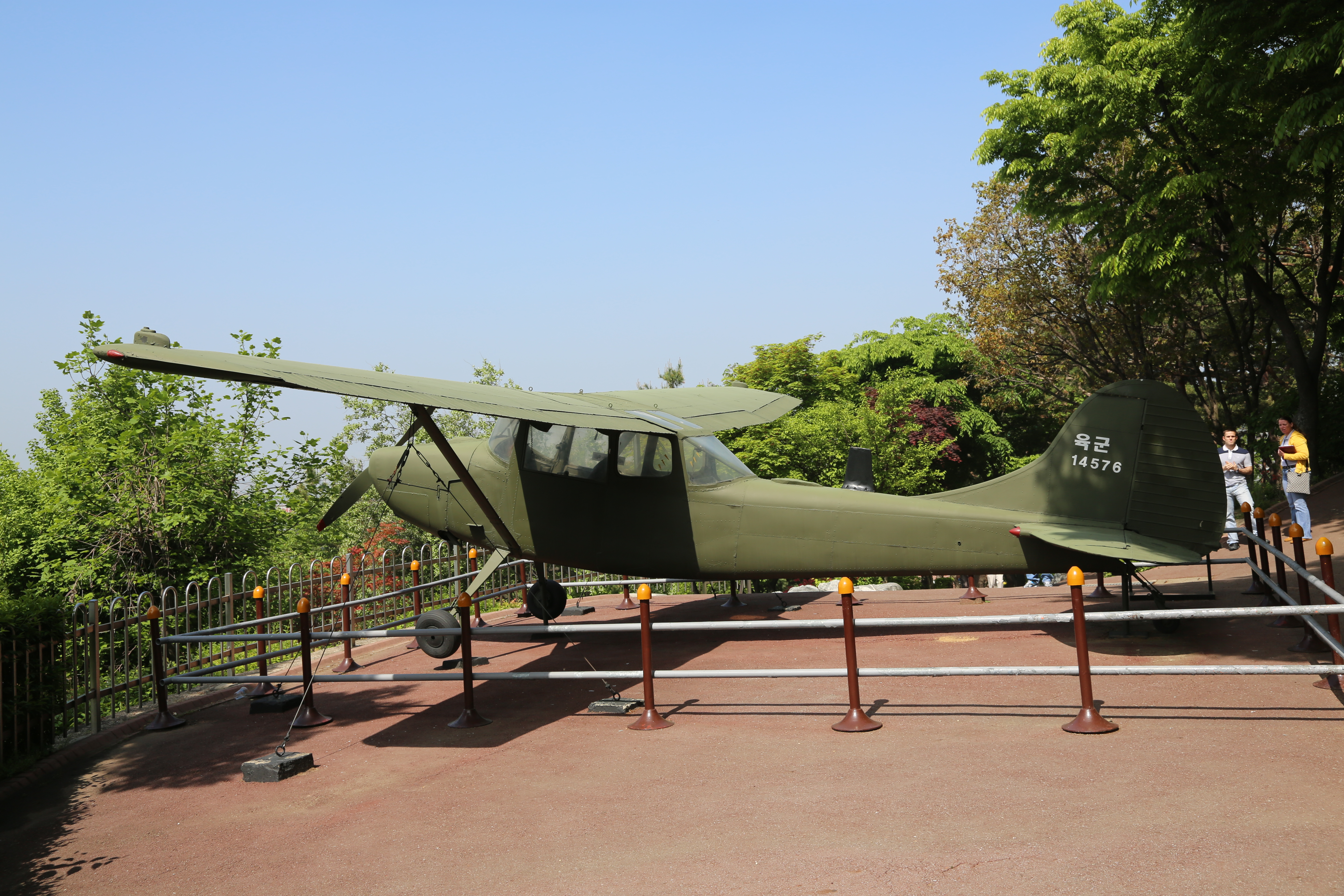
A Bird-Dog preserved at Incheon, South Korea

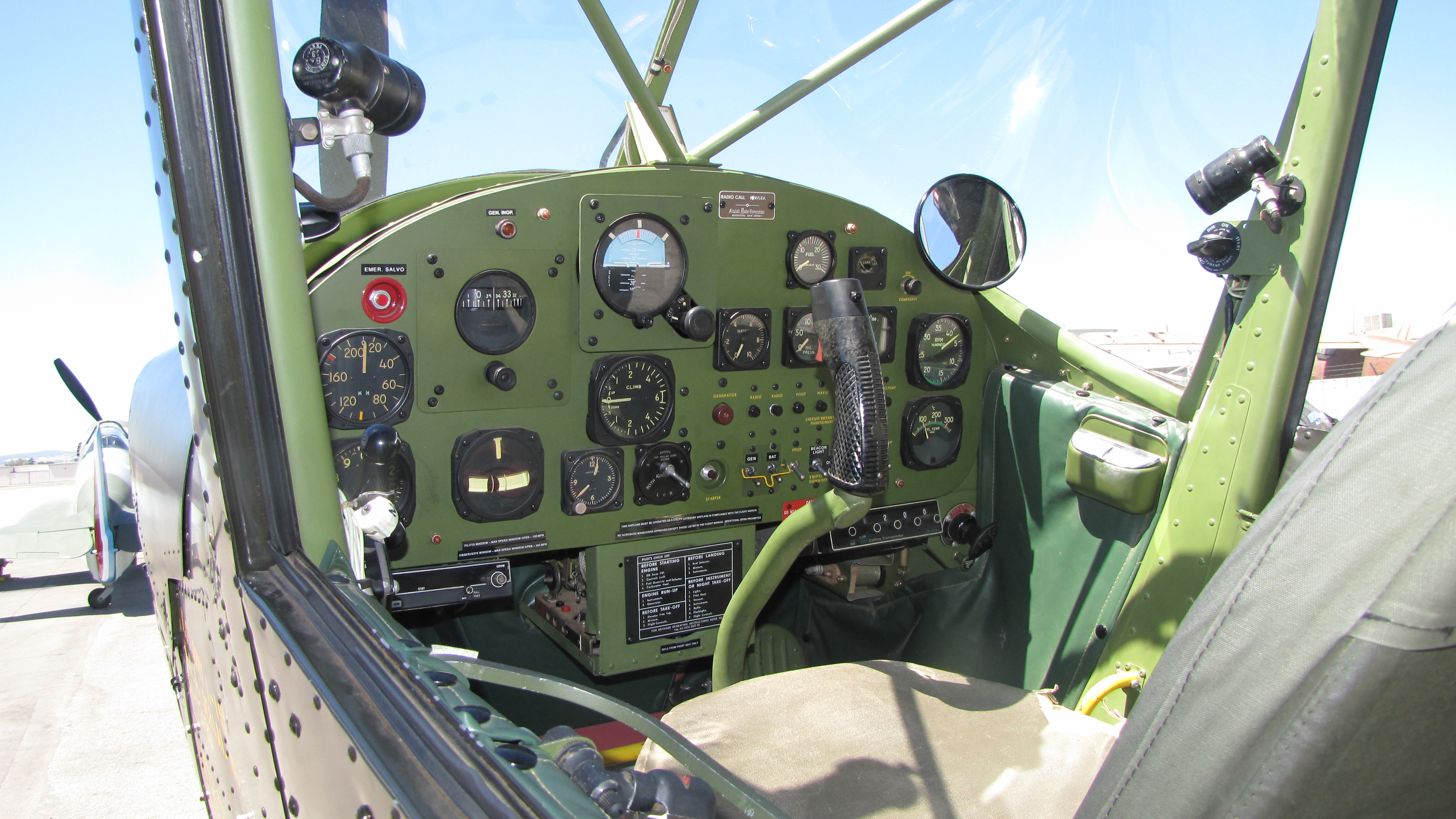
Cockpit of an O-1 at aviation museum

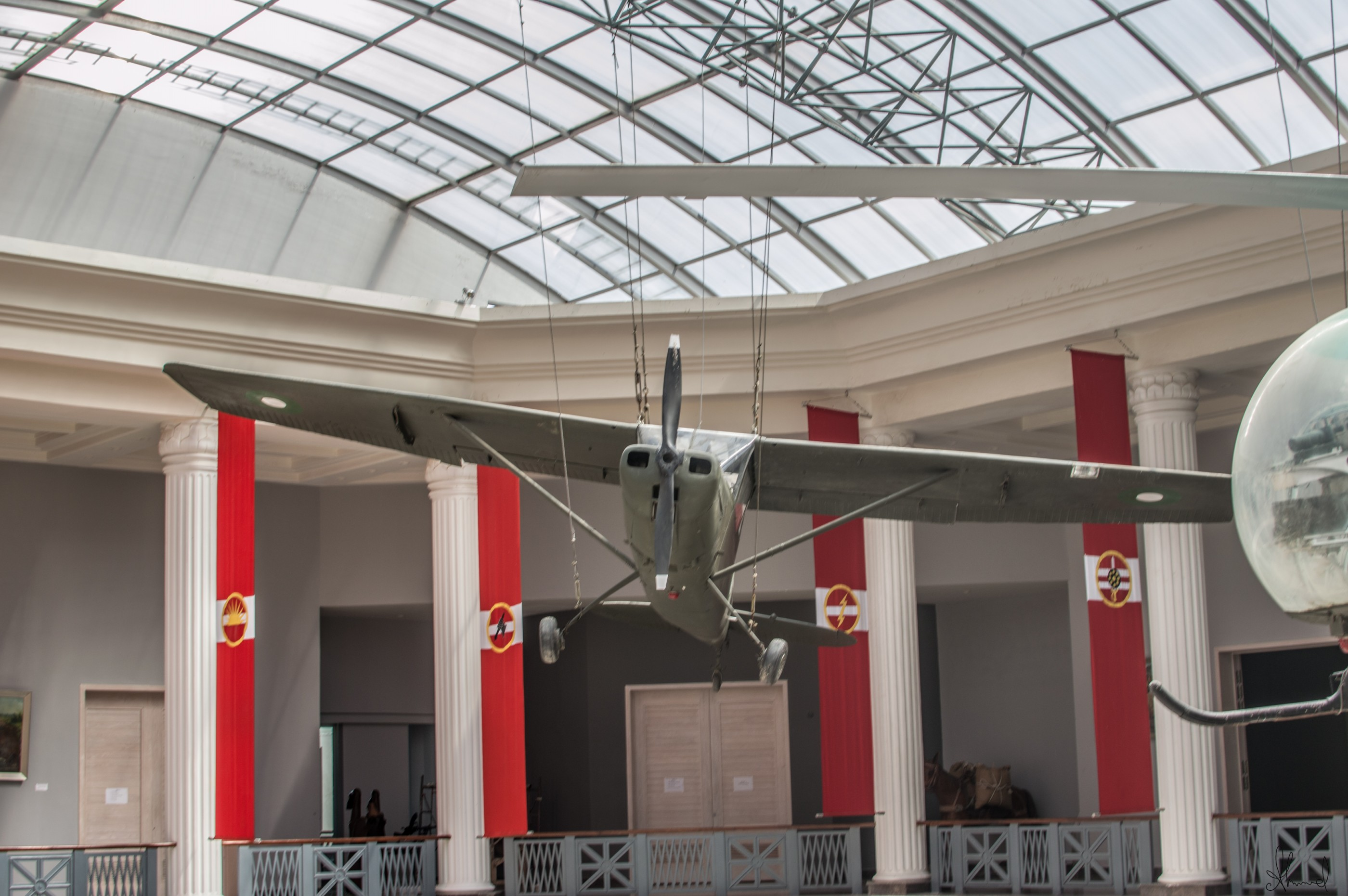
A hanging L-19 inside the Pakistan Army Museum.

These are mostly historical (not current) list of operators:

Australia

- Australian Army – 161 Recce Flight operated 2 aircraft during the Vietnam War. One was shot down on 23 May 1968, killing the flight's commanding officer, Major George Constable. The aircraft was replaced and continued in service until 161 withdrew from Vietnam. A second plane, Bunny 2, was assembled from pieces scrounged by unit members, flown then disassembled and smuggled back to Australia as "spare parts" where it was assembled and flown.

Austria

- Austrian Air Force

Brazil

- Brazilian Air Force

Cambodia

- Khmer Air Force

Canada

- Royal Canadian Air Force
- Canadian Army
- Royal Canadian Air Cadets

Chile

- Chilean Air Force

France

- French Army

Indonesia

- Indonesian Air Force

Iraq

- Iraqi Air Force

Italy

- Italian Army

Japan

- Japanese Ground Self-Defense Force

Kingdom of Laos

- Royal Lao Air Force

Malta

- Armed Forces of Malta Air Wing received five O-1Es from Italy in 1992. All retired as of 2026.

North Korea

- North Korean Air Force

Norway

- Royal Norwegian Air Force

Pakistan

- Pakistan Army

Philippines

- Philippine Air Force
- Philippine Navy
- Philippine Army

South Korea

- Republic of Korea Air Force

South Vietnam

- Republic of Vietnam Air Force

Spain

- Spanish Air Force
- Spanish Army

Saudi Arabia

- Saudi Air Force

Taiwan

- Republic of China Army
- Republic of China Marine Corps

Thailand

- Royal Thai Air Force
- Royal Thai Army
- Royal Thai Navy

Turkey

- Turkish Army

United States

- United States Air Force
- United States Army
- United States Marine Corps
- Civil Air Patrol

Vietnam

- Vietnam People's Air Force (captured South Vietnamese aircraft)

== Specifications (O-1E) ==
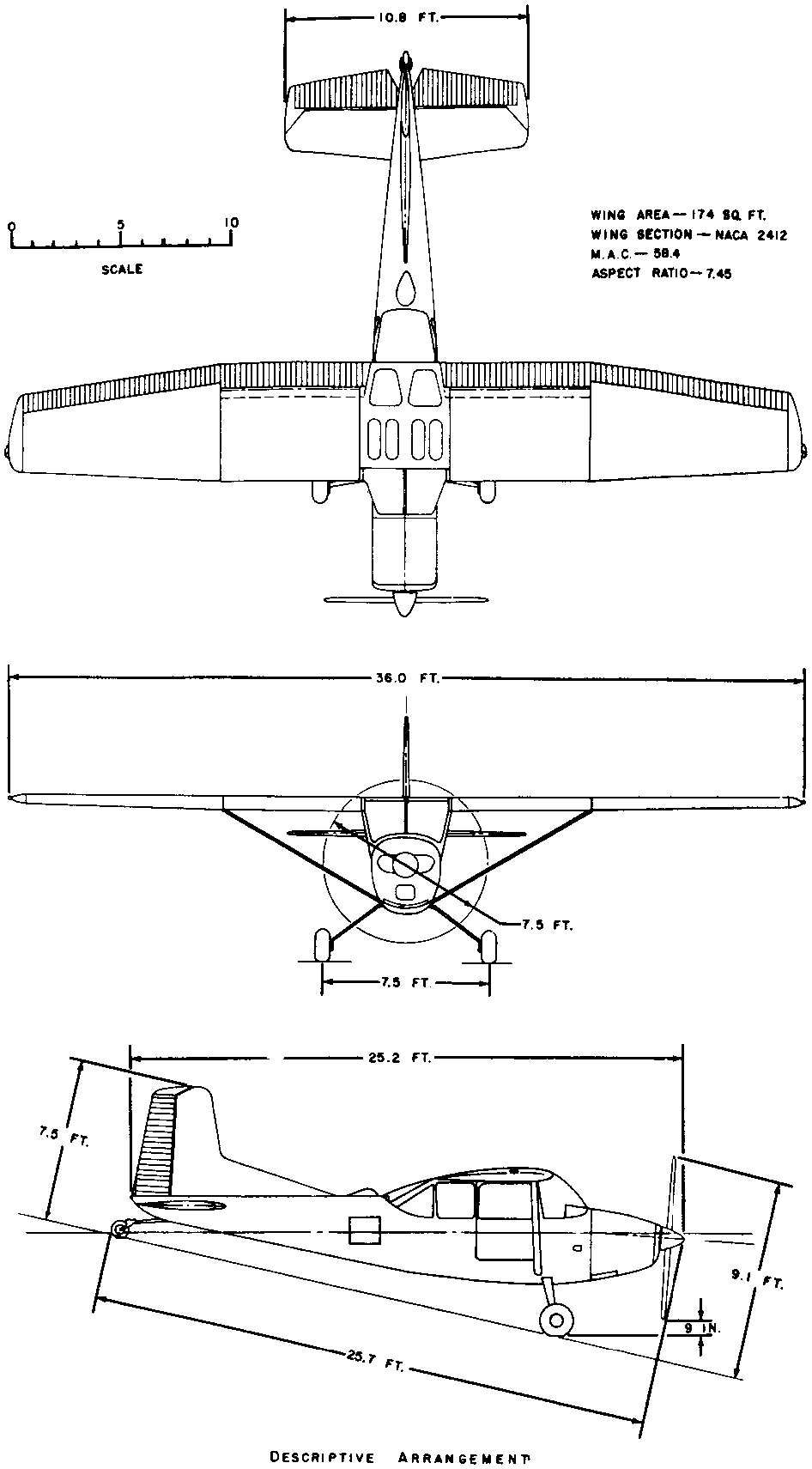
3-view line drawing of the Cessna O-1C Bird Dog

Data from Jane's All The World's Aircraft 1962–63

General characteristics

- Crew: one/two
- Length: 25 ft 10 in (7.87 m)
- Wingspan: 36 ft 0 in (10.97 m)
- Height: 7 ft 4 in (2.24 m)
- Wing area: 174 sq ft (16.2 m^{2})
- Empty weight: 1,614 lb (732 kg)
- Max takeoff weight: 2,430 lb (1,102 kg)
- Fuel capacity: 41 US gal (34 imp gal; 160 L)
- Powerplant: 1 × Continental O-470-11 air-cooled flat-six, 213 hp (159 kW)

Performance

- Maximum speed: 115 mph (185 km/h, 100 kn)
- Cruise speed: 104 mph (167 km/h, 90 kn) at 5,000 ft (1,500 m)
- Range: 530 mi (850 km, 460 nmi)
- Service ceiling: 18,500 ft (5,600 m)
- Absolute ceiling: 24,800 ft (7,600 m)
- Rate of climb: 1,150 ft/min (5.8 m/s)
- Take-off distance to 50 ft (15 m): 560 ft (170 m)
- Landing distance from 50 ft (15 m): 600 ft (180 m)

== See also ==
Related development

- Cessna 170
- Cessna 172
- Cessna T-41 Mescalero

Aircraft of comparable role, configuration, and era

- Stinson L-13
- Auster AOP.6
