= Lycoming GSO-580 =

GSO-580
- Type: Piston aero-engine
- Manufacturer: Lycoming Engines
- Major applications: Beechcraft Model 34; Fairchild XNQ
- Manufactured: 1948–1961

The Lycoming GSO-580 is a family of eight-cylinder horizontally opposed, supercharged, carburetor-equipped aircraft engines for both airplanes and helicopters, manufactured by Lycoming Engines in the late 1950s and early 1960s.

The family includes the original GSO-580 fixed-wing aircraft engine series, as well as the later SO-580 and VSO-580 helicopter engines. There is no non-supercharged, non-geared version of the engine, which would have been designated O-580 and therefore the base model is the GSO-580.

== Design and development ==
The GSO-580 family of engines covers a range from 375 hp (280 kW) to 400 hp (298 kW). All have a displacement of 578 cubic inches (9.47 litres) and the cylinders have air-cooled heads. Compared to other horizontally opposed engines of similar displacement this family of engines produces high output power by supercharging and high maximum rpm, at the cost of higher weight.

The GSO-580 series was certified under Type Certificate 256, while the SO-580 and VSO-580 series were certified under type certificate 285. Both were manufactured under Production Certificate No. 3.

== Variants ==
O-580-1
Military variant similar to the GSO-580-D
GSO-580
Eight-cylinder, horizontally opposed, geared-drive, supercharged, 578 cubic inches (9.47 litres), 375 hp (280 kW) at 3300 rpm for take-off, 320 hp (239 kW) at 3000 rpm continuous, dry weight 619 lb (281 kg), Bendix PSH-9BDE carburetor. Minimum fuel grade 91/98 avgas. Designation indicates Geared, Supercharged, Opposed.
GSO-580-B
Eight-cylinder, horizontally opposed, geared-drive, supercharged, 578 cubic inches (9.47 litres), 400 hp (298 kW) at 3300 rpm for take-off, 350 hp (261 kW) at 3000 rpm continuous, dry weight 624 lb (283 kg), Bendix PSH-9BDE carburetor. Minimum fuel grade 100/130 avgas. Designation indicates Geared, Supercharged, Opposed.
GSO-580-C
Eight-cylinder, horizontally opposed, geared-drive, supercharged, 578 cubic inches (9.47 litres), 375 hp (280 kW) at 3300 rpm for take-off, 320 hp (239 kW) at 3000 rpm continuous, dry weight 604 lb (274 kg), Bendix PS-9BDE carburetor. Minimum fuel grade 91/98 avgas. Designation indicates Geared, Supercharged, Opposed.
GSO-580-D
Eight-cylinder, horizontally opposed, geared-drive, supercharged, 578 cubic inches (9.47 litres), 400 hp (298 kW) at 3300 rpm for take-off, 350 hp (261 kW) at 3000 rpm continuous, dry weight 608 lb (276 kg), Bendix PS-9BDE carburetor. Minimum fuel grade 100/130 avgas. Designation indicates Geared, Supercharged, Opposed.
SO-580-A1A
Eight-cylinder, horizontally opposed, geared-drive, supercharged, 578 cubic inches (9.47 litres), 400 hp (298 kW) at 3300 rpm for take-off, 350 hp (261 kW) at 3000 rpm continuous, dry weight 596 lb (270 kg), Bendix PS-9BDE carburetor. Minimum fuel grade 100/130 avgas. Designation indicates Supercharged, Opposed. Designed for horizontal or up to 35 degrees nose-up helicopter installation.
SO-580-A1B
Eight-cylinder, horizontally opposed, geared-drive, supercharged, 578 cubic inches (9.47 litres), 400 hp (298 kW) at 3300 rpm for take-off, 350 hp (261 kW) at 3000 rpm continuous, dry weight 578 lb (262 kg), Bendix PS-9BDE carburetor. Minimum fuel grade 100/130 avgas. Designation indicates Supercharged, Opposed. Designed for horizontal or up to 35 degrees nose-up helicopter installation.
VSO-580-A1A
Eight-cylinder, horizontally opposed, geared-drive, supercharged, 578 cubic inches (9.47 litres), 400 hp (298 kW) at 3300 rpm for take-off, 350 hp (261 kW) at 3000 rpm continuous, dry weight 592 lb (269 kg), Bendix PS-9BDE carburetor. Minimum fuel grade 100/130 avgas. Designation indicates Vertical-mounted, Supercharged, Opposed. Designed for vertical helicopter installation.

== Applications ==
GSO-580

- Beechcraft Model 34
- Cessna 308
- Fairchild XNQ

SO-580

- Doman LZ-5

== Specifications (VSO-580-A1A) ==
Data from FAA AIRCRAFT ENGINE SPECIFICATION E-285, Revision 2

=== General characteristics ===
- Type: 8-cylinder fuel-injected horizontally opposed, vertically mounted, helicopter engine
- Bore: 4.875 in (123.8 mm)
- Stroke: 3.875 in (98.4 mm)
- Displacement: 578 cu in (9.47 L)
- Dry weight: 592 lb (269 kg) dry

=== Components ===
- Supercharger: 7.91:1 drive ratio
- Fuel system: Bendix PS9BDE carburetor
- Fuel type: 100/130 avgas minimum
- Cooling system: air-cooled

=== Performance ===
- Power output: 400 hp (300 kW) at 3300 rpm
- Specific power: 0.51 hp/in³ (33.3 kW/L)
- Compression ratio: 7.30:1
- Power-to-weight ratio: 0.68 hp/lb (1.12 kW/kg)

== See also ==
- Lycoming IO-580

Related lists

- List of aircraft engines
