= Phúc Thọ (disambiguation) =

Phúc Thọ may refer to several places in Vietnam, including :

- Phúc Thọ, a commune in Hanoi.
- Phúc Thọ District, a former rural district in Hanoi.
  - Phúc Thọ, its eponymous capital township.
- Phúc Thọ, a commune in the former Lâm Hà District in Lâm Đồng province.
- Phúc Thọ, a commune in the former Nghi Lộc District in Nghệ An province.
