= Phúc Thọ =

Phúc Thọ Commune Xã Phúc Thọ Thị trấn Phúc Thọ
- Commune (Class-II)
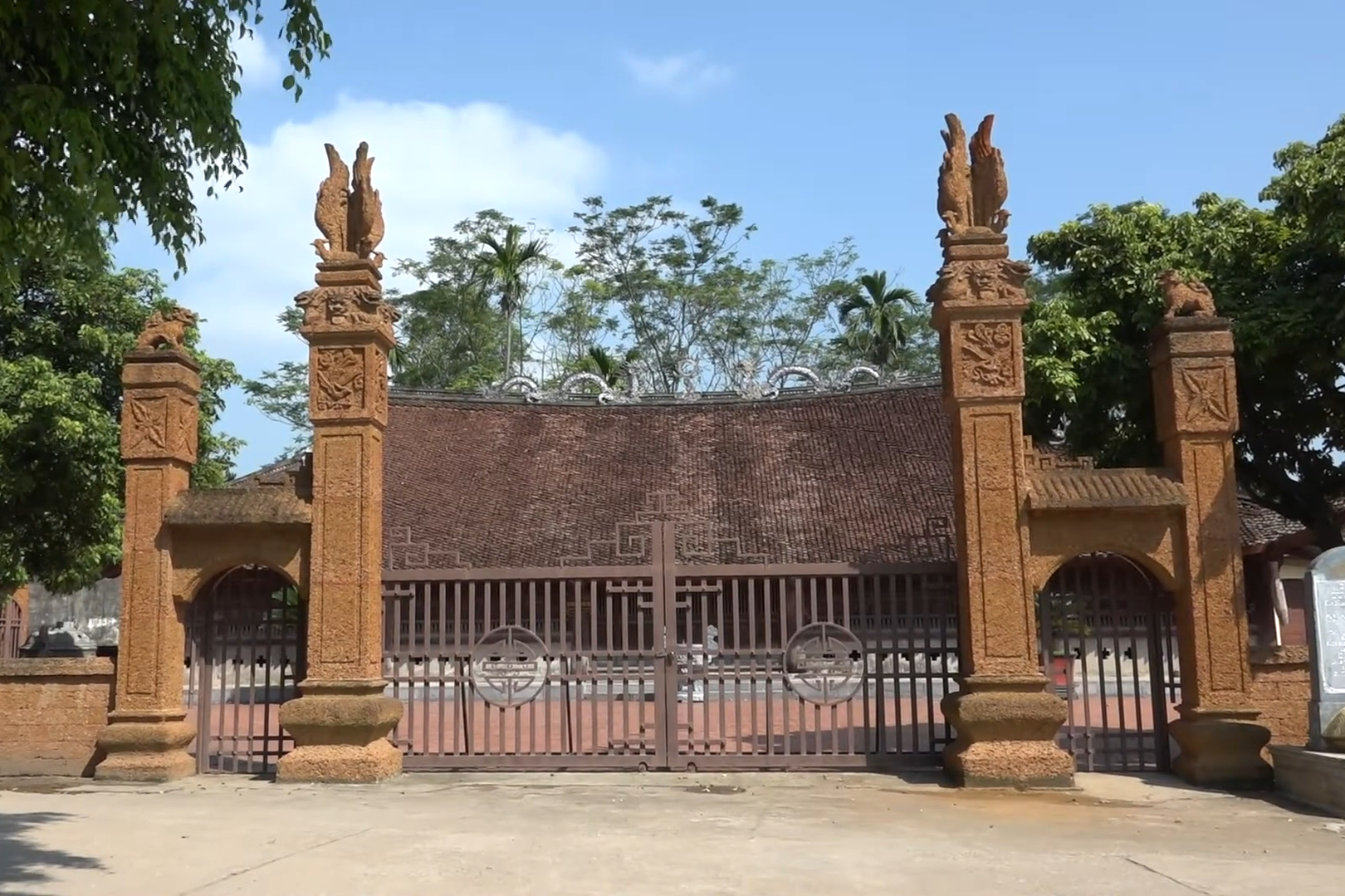
- View of Tường Phiêu Communal Hall.
- Interactive map of Phúc Thọ Commune
- Location within Vietnam
- Country: Vietnam
- Region: Red River Delta
- Municipality: Hà Nội
- Establishment: 1994 (township); June 16, 2025 (Note: Từ ngày 1/7/2025, thành phố Hà Nội chính thức đưa vào hoạt động 126 đơn vị hành chính cấp xã, phường mới theo Nghị quyết số 1656/NQ-UBTVQH15 của Ủy ban Thường vụ Quốc hội.) (ward)
- Central hall: No.39, Lạc Trị Road, Phúc Thọ Commune

Government
  - Type: Commune-level authority
  - People Committee's Chairman: Kiều Trọng Sỹ
  - People Council's Chairman: Nguyễn Doãn Hoàn
  - Front Committee's Chairman: Lê Thị Kim Phương
  - Party Committee's Secretary: Nguyễn Doãn Hoàn

Area
  - Total: 39.66 km^{2} (15.31 sq mi)

Population (July 1, 2025)
  - Total: 75,425
  - Density: 1,902/km^{2} (4,926/sq mi)
  - Ethnicities: Kinh; Tanka; Tai
- Time zone: UTC+7 (Indochina Time)
- ZIP code: 10000–12806 (Note: An official code from December 31, 2023, to present.)
- Climate: Cwa
- Website: Phuctho.Hanoi.gov.vn; Phuctho.Hanoi.dcs.vn

Phúc Thọ [fuk˧˥:tʰɔ̰ʔ˨˩] is a commune of Hanoi the capital city in the Red River Delta of Vietnam.

== History ==
Its name, Phúc Thọ, has been interpreted as a way of preserving the cultural, historical, and traditional values of the old district.

=== 20th century ===
Phúc Thọ Township (福壽市鎮, thị trấn Phúc Thọ) was established in 1994 by the Hà Tây Provincial People's Committee on the basis of merging two communes Phúc Hòa and Thọ Lộc. It has served as the capital of Phúc Thọ rural district for 30 years since then. However, the local authority has been frequently criticized by the press for poor management and even corruption, which has kept the living standards of the common people here the lowest in the whole Hà Tây province.

=== 21st century ===
On June 16, 2025, to meet the urgent needs of the plan to arrange and merge administrative units by the Central Government, the Hanoi City People's Committee has issued a Decision to dissolve all districts in their area. In rural areas, communes have been merged to reduce waste in administrative and economic plannings. According to that policy, Phúc Thọ Commune (福壽社, xã Phúc Thọ) was established through the merger of former administrative units, as follows : Phúc Thọ Township and five communes Long Thượng, Phúc Hòa, Phụng Thượng, Tích Lộc, Trạch Mỹ Lộc.

== Geography ==
=== Topography ===
Phúc Thọ Commune has relatively flat terrain and almost no mountains. This area is the confluence of the three largest rivers in the Red River Delta : Hát Giang, Hồng Hà, and Tích Giang. That feature brings advantages in transportation and agriculture, but also causes serious consequences for people's lives every rainy season.

=== Climate ===
Climate data for Phúc Thọ Commune
Month	Jan	Feb	Mar	Apr	May	Jun	Jul	Aug	Sep	Oct	Nov	Dec	Year
Record high °C (°F)	31.4 (88.5)	34.0 (93.2)	38.0 (100.4)	40.4 (104.7)	40.5 (104.9)	41.6 (106.9)	40.1 (104.2)	39.1 (102.4)	37.5 (99.5)	35.6 (96.1)	34.0 (93.2)	31.2 (88.2)	41.6 (106.9)
Mean daily maximum °C (°F)	19.7 (67.5)	20.7 (69.3)	23.4 (74.1)	27.7 (81.9)	31.8 (89.2)	33.2 (91.8)	33.2 (91.8)	32.5 (90.5)	31.5 (88.7)	29.3 (84.7)	25.8 (78.4)	22.1 (71.8)	27.6 (81.7)
Daily mean °C (°F)	16.3 (61.3)	17.6 (63.7)	20.2 (68.4)	24.0 (75.2)	27.2 (81.0)	28.9 (84.0)	28.9 (84.0)	28.4 (83.1)	27.3 (81.1)	25.0 (77.0)	21.5 (70.7)	17.9 (64.2)	23.6 (74.5)
Mean daily minimum °C (°F)	14.1 (57.4)	15.6 (60.1)	18.2 (64.8)	21.5 (70.7)	24.2 (75.6)	25.9 (78.6)	26.0 (78.8)	25.7 (78.3)	24.7 (76.5)	22.3 (72.1)	18.5 (65.3)	15.3 (59.5)	21.1 (70.0)
Record low °C (°F)	4.6 (40.3)	5.4 (41.7)	4.5 (40.1)	13.0 (55.4)	17.3 (63.1)	20.4 (68.7)	19.5 (67.1)	19.8 (67.6)	17.2 (63.0)	14.4 (57.9)	9.2 (48.6)	5.1 (41.2)	4.5 (40.1)
Average rainfall mm (inches)	25.6 (1.01)	24.6 (0.97)	43.3 (1.70)	96.1 (3.78)	216.6 (8.53)	262.9 (10.35)	311.8 (12.28)	314.6 (12.39)	224.3 (8.83)	158.4 (6.24)	63.0 (2.48)	22.0 (0.87)	1,751.2 (68.94)
Average rainy days	9.7	11.1	14.6	13.5	15.5	15.6	16.9	16.5	13.1	9.7	6.9	6.0	149.1
Average relative humidity (%)	83.8	85.0	86.7	87.2	84.6	82.9	83.6	85.4	84.6	82.4	81.3	80.4	84.0
Mean monthly sunshine hours	65.5	48.8	49.3	91.6	172.4	165.4	181.1	173.4	170.5	151.3	130.5	108.9	1,494.7
Source: Vietnam Institute for Building Science and Technology

== See also ==
- Ba Vì
- Đan Phượng
- Phúc Lộc
- Sơn Tây
- Thạch Thất
