= Hoài Đức =

Hoài Đức may refer to several places in Vietnam:

- Hoài Đức District, a former rural district of Hanoi
- Hoài Đức (commune), a rural commune of Hanoi
- Hoài Đức, Bình Định, a rural commune of Hoài Nhơn District
- Hoài Đức, Lâm Đồng, a rural commune of Lâm Hà District
