= Đan Phượng (disambiguation) =

Đan Phượng may refer to several places in Vietnam, including:

- Đan Phượng, a commune of Hanoi
- Đan Phượng district, a former rural district of Hanoi
