= Ta Nang-Phan Dung trail =

Multi-day trekking route in southern Vietnam

Tà Năng–Phan Dũng trail
- Cung đường Tà Năng – Phan Dũng
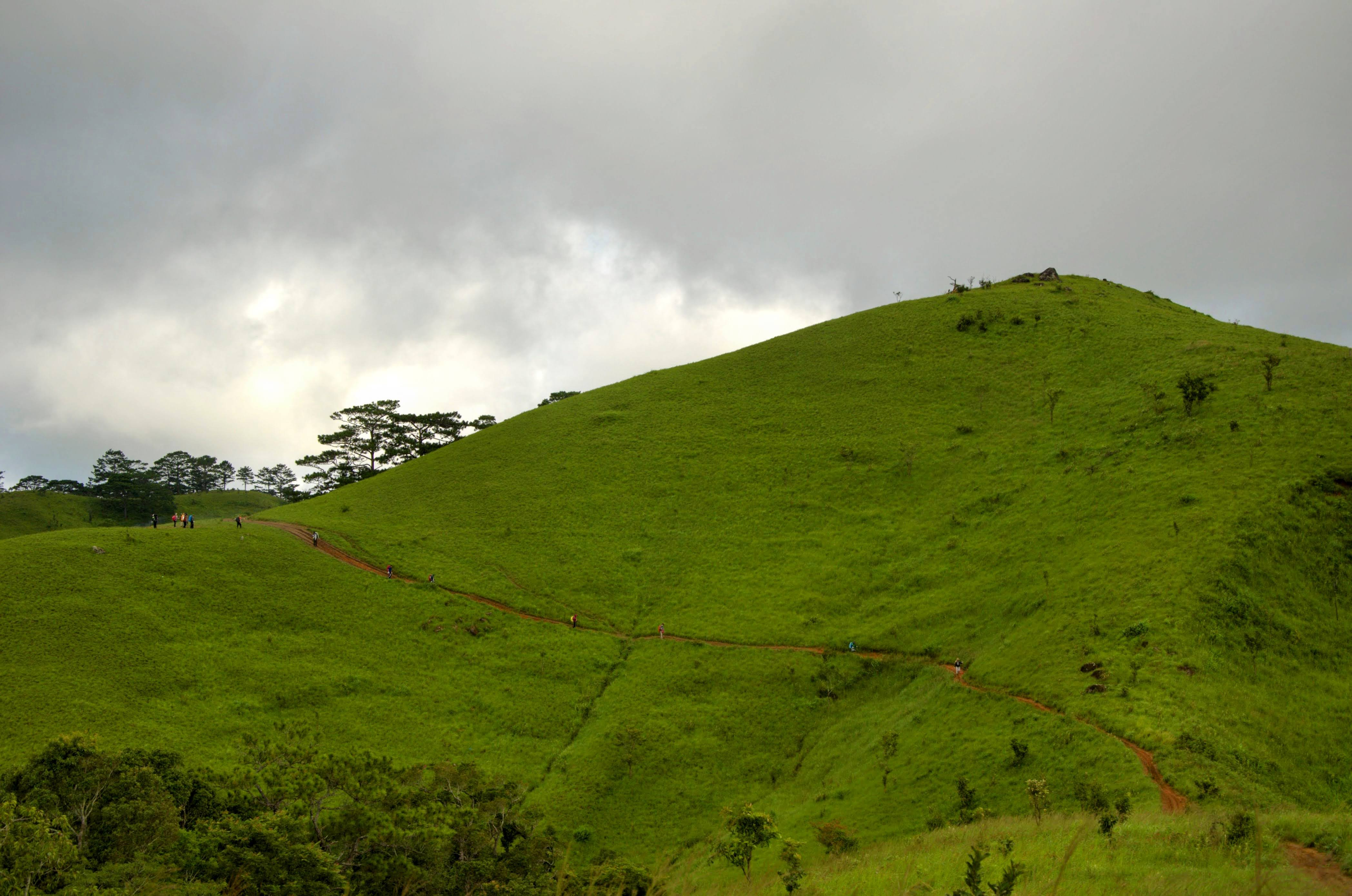
- Grass hills on the Tà Năng–Phan Dũng trail
- Length: 50 km (31 mi)
- Location: Lâm Đồng province and Bình Thuận province, Vietnam
- Trailheads: Start: forest protection checkpoint in Tà Năng, Ma Bó, Đạ Quyn, Đức Trọng, Lâm Đồng; End: forest edge near Phan Dũng, Tuy Phong, Bình Thuận
- Use: Trekking; camping
- Elevation change: about 600 m (2,000 ft)
- Highest point: about 1,100 m (3,600 ft)
- Lowest point: about 500 m (1,600 ft)
- Difficulty: Moderate to challenging
- Season: Dry season generally preferred (December–April); rainy season May–November depending on conditions
- Sights: Tà Năng pine forest; Tà Năng grass hills; former Lâm Đồng–Ninh Thuận–Bình Thuận tri-province marker; Doi Linh; Yavly waterfall; La Ngâu valley
- Hazards: Getting lost; long descents; slippery surfaces; flash flooding at streams; landslides; heat in dry season; wildfire; mosquitoes; ticks

The Tà Năng–Phan Dũng trail is a multi-day hikinh trail in southern Vietnam. The route is commonly traveled as a one-way walk beginning near Tà Năng in Đức Trọng, Lâm Đồng province, and ending near Phan Dũng in Tuy Phong, Bình Thuận province. The trail passes along the geographical transition from the Central Highlands toward the South Central Coast, and passes through pine forest, grass hills, evergreen forest, and stream valleys. The route is associated with navigation and weather-related risks, particularly during the rainy season.

== Overview ==
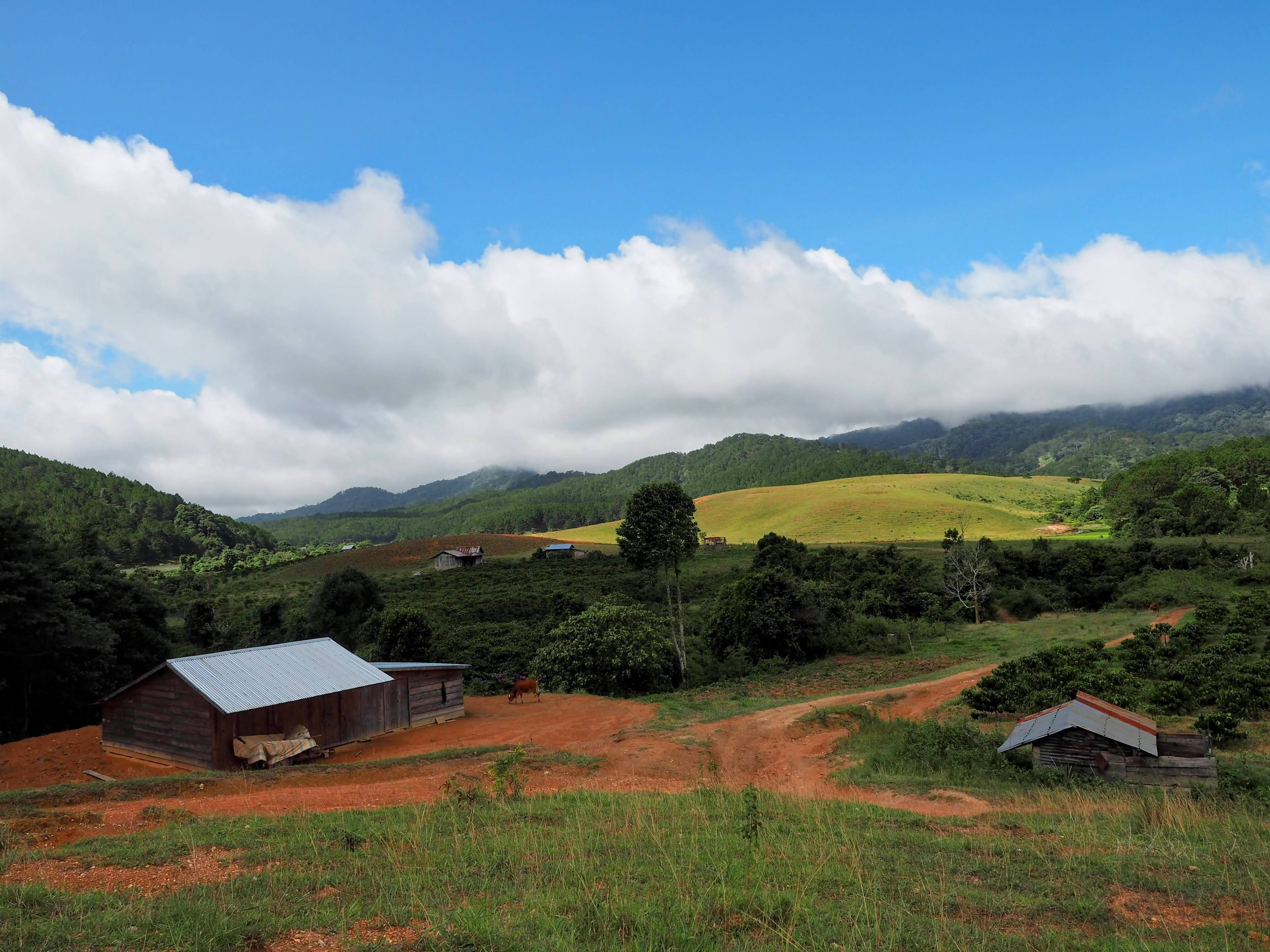
The trailhead area in Tà Năng includes grass hills interwoven with pine forest.

The trail begins in Tà Năng and runs through pine-covered hills and cultivated areas before reaching exposed ridgelines, then descends east to southeast toward Phan Dũng. The route length is often given as about 50 to 55 km (31 to 34 mi), with variation by itinerary and side routes; some itineraries approach 60 km (37 mi) when including side trips such as Yavly waterfall.

Elevation drops from roughly 1,100 m (3,600 ft) near the highland end to roughly 500 m (1,600 ft) near the lowland end, with corresponding changes in vegetation and microclimate along the route. Many groups complete the route in two to three days, typically arranging transport at the finish or using local roads for return logistics.

== Route description ==
=== Direction and segments ===
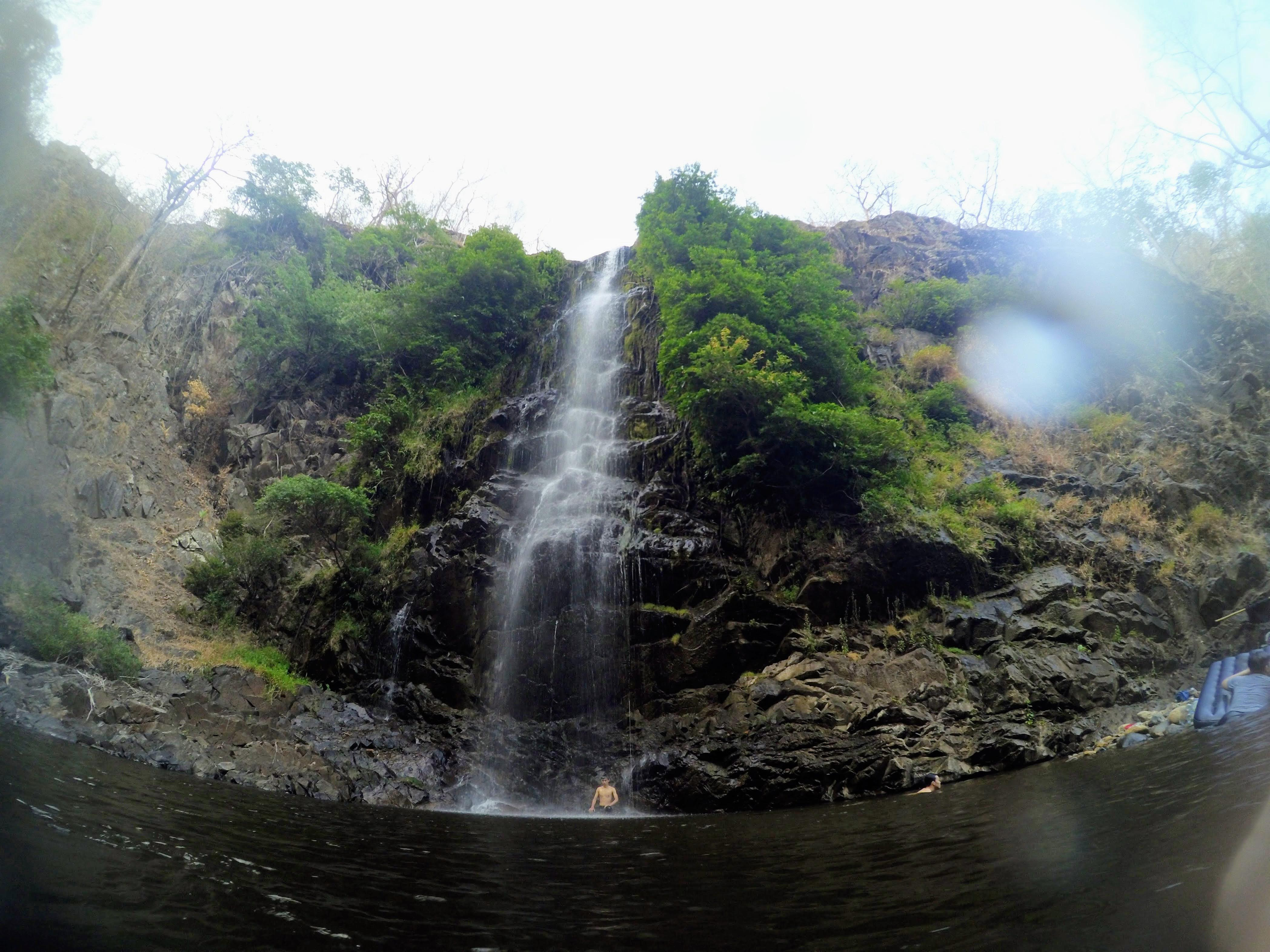
Yavly waterfall is a side destination associated with the route.

A common itinerary completes the trek in two days with one overnight camp on an exposed hilltop or ridgeline. Day one includes sustained climbs through grass hills and pine forest; day two emphasizes a long descent through forest toward Phan Dũng.

A concrete marker associated with the former administrative boundary point between Lâm Đồng, Ninh Thuận, and Bình Thuận serves as a prominent landmark and common rest stop for panoramic views. From this area, route variants include (a) a more open ridge-and-grassland line that is generally easier to follow, and (b) stream- and waterfall-adjacent approaches that involve steeper terrain and slippery rock and depend on weather and water levels.

Following a fatal incident in 2018, warning signs and safety guidance highlighted hazards on a branch leading toward Lao Phào waterfall, including difficult access for rescue in poor conditions. Side trips to Yavly waterfall are also associated with the route, with feasibility tied to water levels and group experience.

=== Maps and coordinates ===
After incidents in 2017–2018, coordination measures included bilingual signage, information points along the route, an emergency hotline, entry registration, and trailhead controls intended to reduce navigation risk as visitor numbers increased. Published materials commonly identify start and end points and major landmarks; comprehensive coordinate sets for campsites are less common in public guidance, alongside recommendations for trained local guiding on safety and forest protection grounds.

== History ==
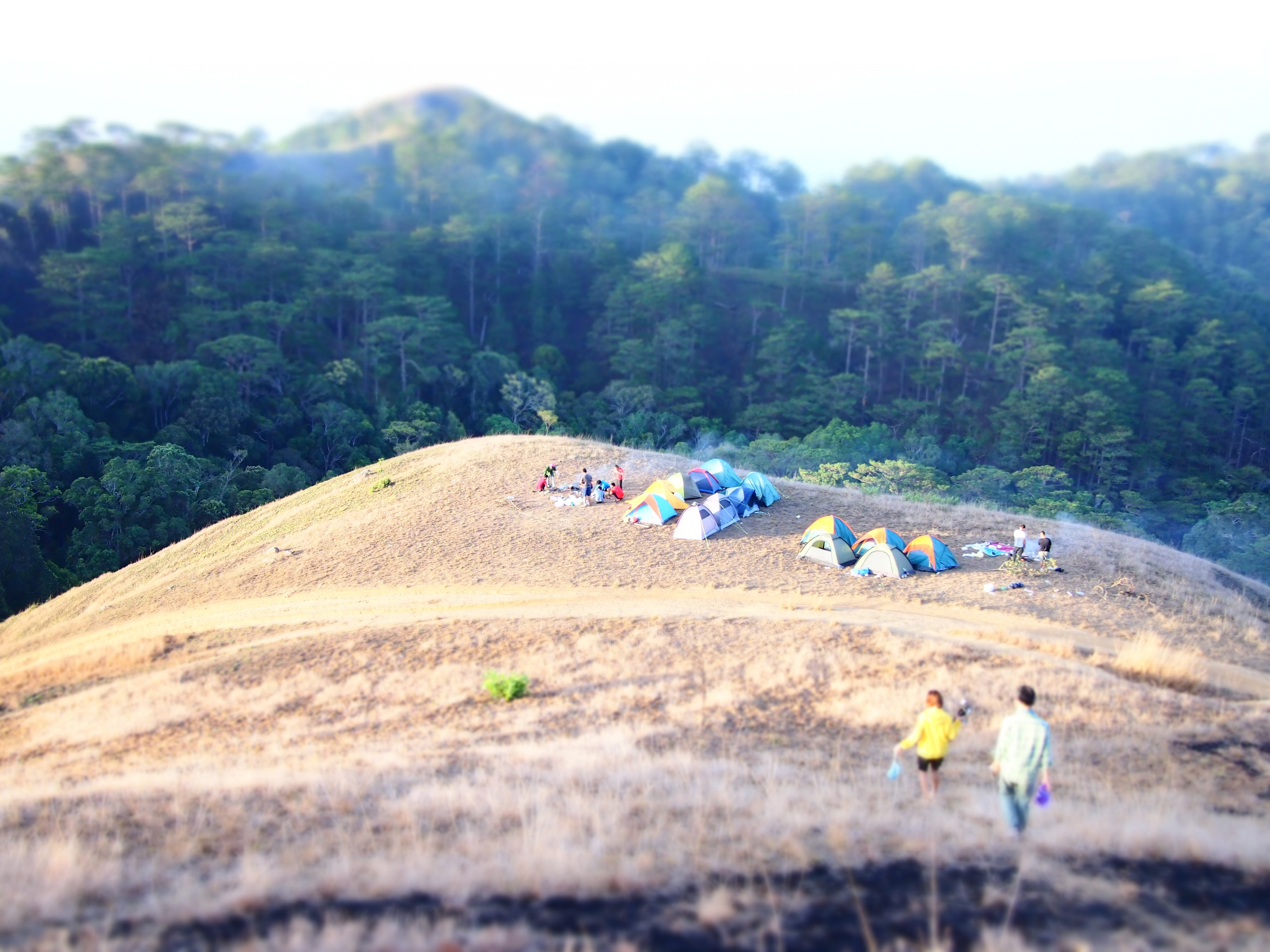
Camping on grass hills along the route during the dry season.

The route gained popularity among trekking and "phượt" communities in the second half of the 2010s and was included in travel roundups of long-distance treks, with attention to grass-hill and pine-forest scenery and a commonly cited distance of 50 to 60 km (31 to 37 mi). Portions of the walk follow or parallel locally used paths associated with cultivation and movement between settlements, especially near the lower-elevation end where farms and stream corridors are present.

Historical trail networks in the southern Trường Sơn region included routes described as "salt roads" connecting highland and coastal areas, providing regional context for long-standing footpath use in adjacent landscapes.

=== Incidents and management changes (2017–2020) ===
Incidents between 2017 and 2019 led to changes in safety communication and management along the route corridor. In October 2017, a trekker died after being swept away by floodwaters while crossing a stream in Bình Thuận province, and the case highlighted stream-crossing risks during the rainy season.

In May 2018, a trekker was reported missing in the Tà Năng–Phan Dũng area; later reports placed the death in the Lao Phào waterfall area after a multi-day search operation involving officials and volunteers. The case also received English-language coverage by Tuổi Trẻ News.

Management measures from 2018 included trail signage, a trailhead control station, waste collection points, and rescue coordination mechanisms between districts and communes at the two ends of the route.

In April 2019, a fatality was reported near Đạ Quyn along the route corridor, reinforcing seasonal and solo-travel risk warnings. In March 2020, trekking on the route was reported suspended during early COVID-19 prevention measures.

=== Pilot tourism product (2023) ===
In 2023, a pilot program linked to the "Sea and Flower Journey" tourism linkage emphasized inter-provincial coordination and safety controls for a managed trekking product. Tiered distances of 10 km (6.2 mi), 18 km (11 mi), and 32 km (20 mi) were cited for different participant groups.

== Management, rules, and access ==
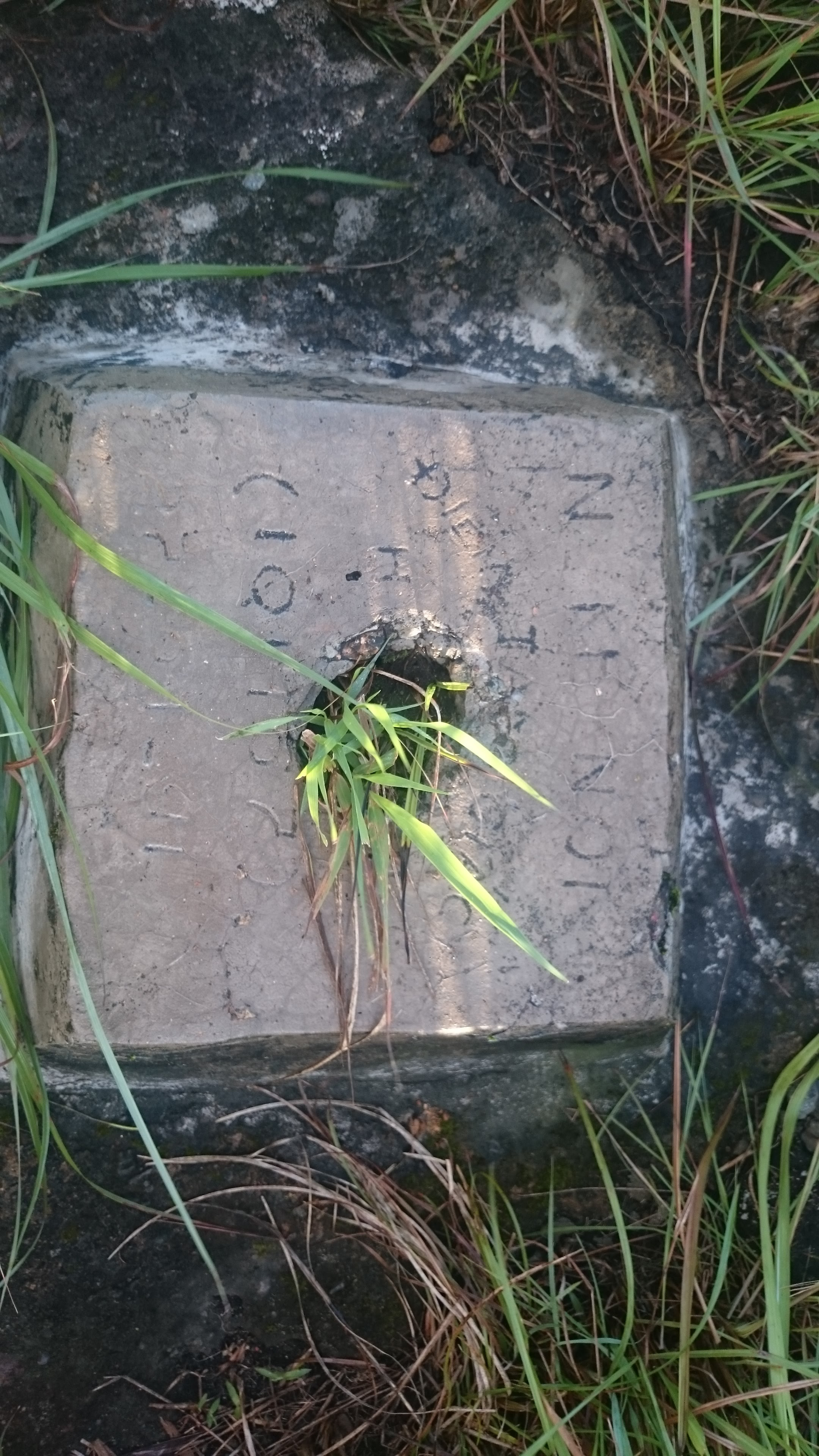
A marker associated with the former boundary point between Lâm Đồng, Ninh Thuận, and Bình Thuận is a common landmark on many itineraries.

The route passes through protection forest areas managed by local forestry entities, with monitoring by forest rangers and local authorities and coordination for emergency response. Measures implemented from 2018 include trail signage, trailhead information points, emergency contact numbers, and guidance to use licensed tours or trained local guides and porters, particularly during the rainy season and on waterfall branches.

Access to the Tà Năng trailhead commonly uses local roads branching from National Route 20 toward Ma Bó and Đạ Quyn, while the Phan Dũng exit connects by forestry and local roads to National Route 1 near Liên Hương in Tuy Phong.

== Geology, landforms, and ecology ==
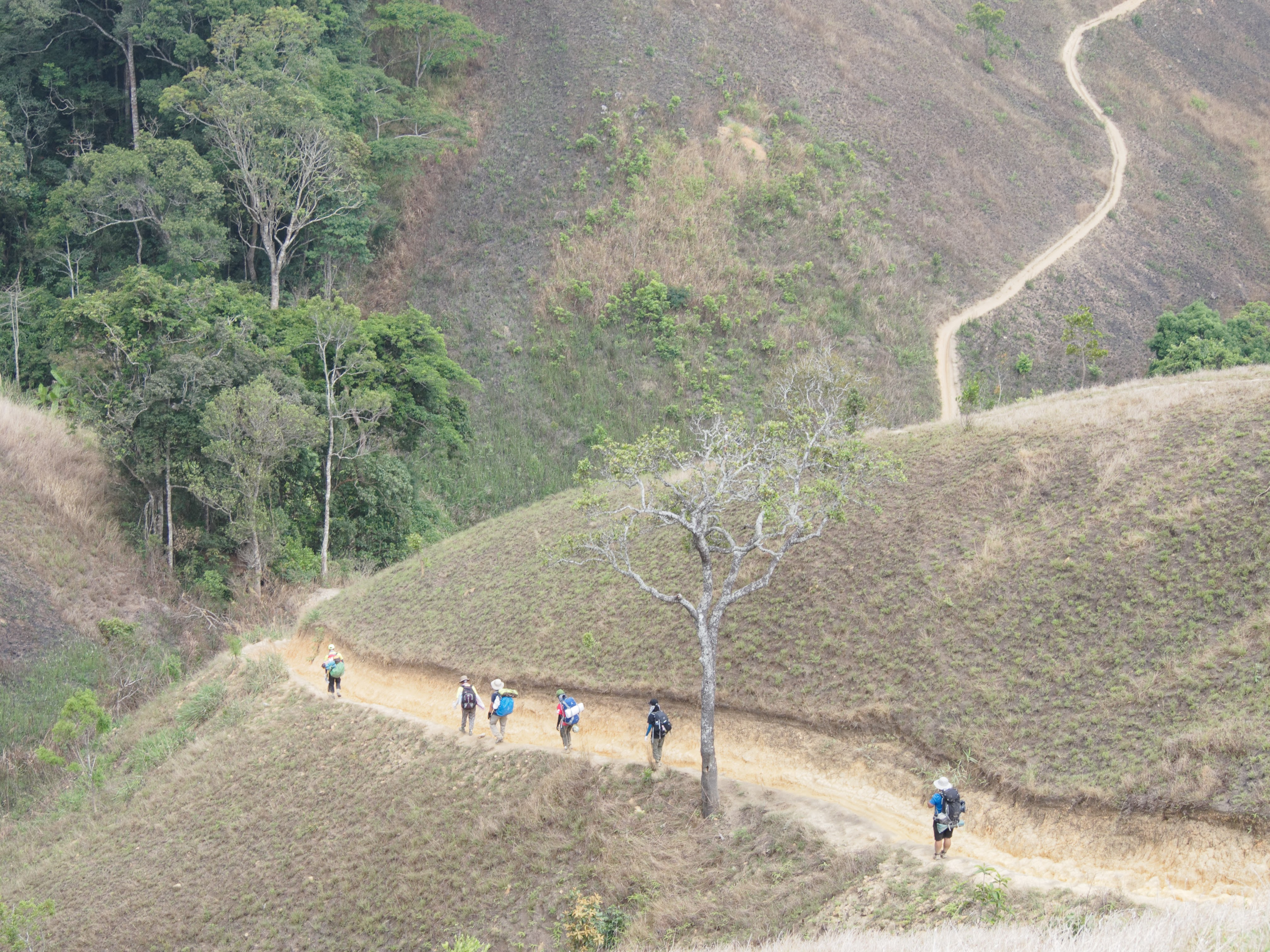
Grass hills along the route during the dry season.

The route corridor crosses a geomorphic transition from volcanic highland surfaces with widespread basalt soils in Lâm Đồng into lower-elevation hills and stream valleys toward Bình Thuận associated with intrusive and metamorphic bedrock, including granitoid complexes. The transition produces contrasts between rolling hill surfaces and narrower ridges and incised valleys with rock steps and small waterfalls. Steep slopes and rapidly changing rainfall conditions contribute to surface runoff, localized erosion, and slippery footing during the rainy season.

Stream levels can rise rapidly during heavy rain, increasing hazards at crossings and in valley campsites, including in drainage systems associated with La Ngâu. Dry-season heat and dryness in the broader South Central Coast and adjacent uplands are linked in guidance to dehydration risk and elevated wildfire hazard late in the dry season.

The elevation gradient and changing substrates correspond to a shift in vegetation along the route. The highland end includes stands of Pinus kesiya (three-needle pine) and mixed broadleaf–conifer forest types characteristic of the Lâm Viên Plateau, while the lower-elevation end includes more evergreen forest interspersed with grasslands and stream habitats.

The route lies near protected-area systems in the southern Trường Sơn region, including Bidoup–Núi Bà National Park and Phước Bình National Park.

== Signage, infrastructure, and safety ==
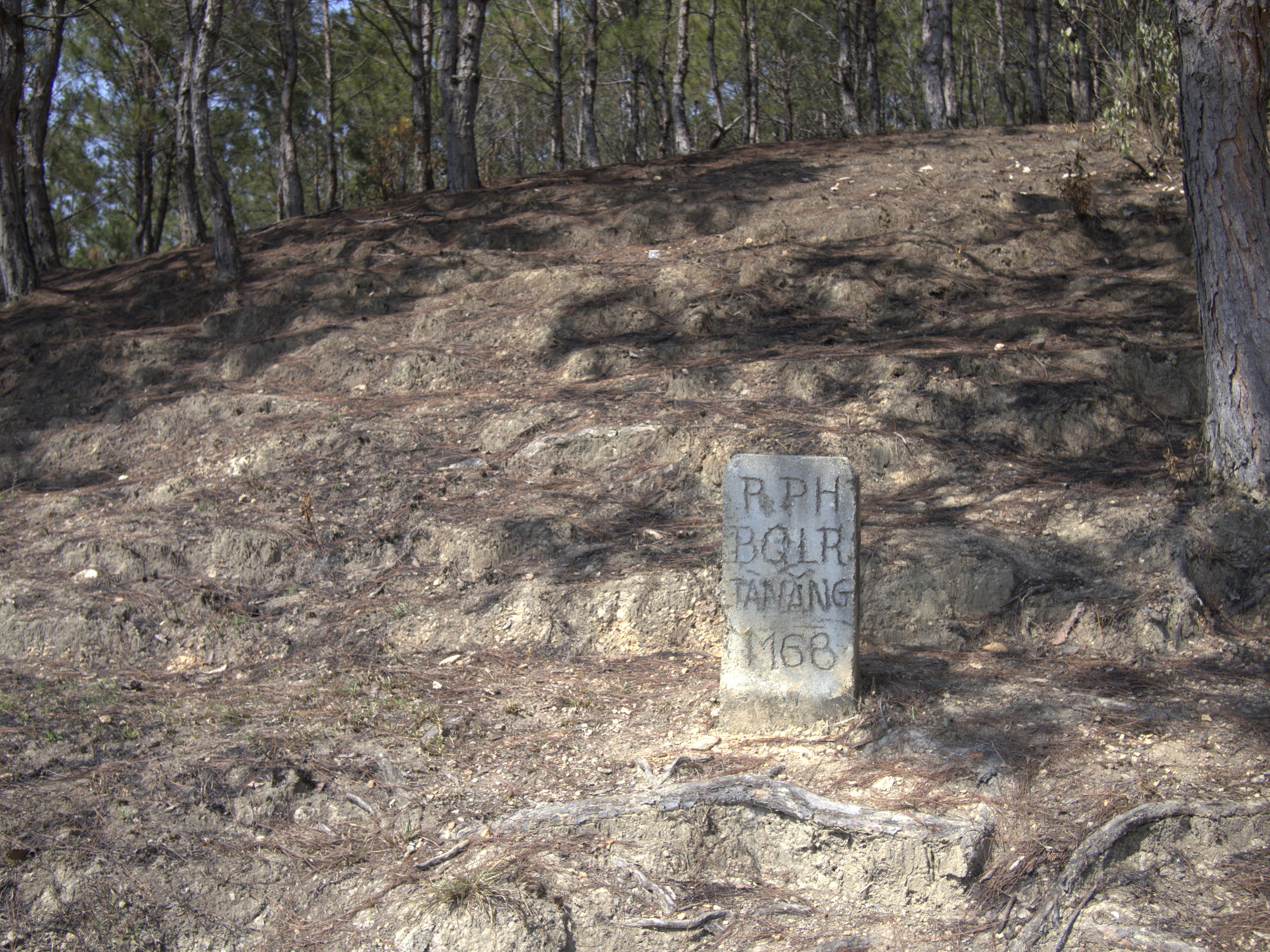
A forest management boundary marker near the Tà Năng end of the route.

Signage and hazard warnings were installed along the trekking corridor beginning in 2018, including at confusing junctions and high-risk locations such as the Lao Phào waterfall branch. Trailhead controls and information points record group entry details and provide emergency contact information and basic safety guidance for multi-day forest treks.

Key hazards include navigation errors in repetitive grass-hill terrain, exhaustion on extended descents, sudden thunderstorms leading to flash flooding in streams, and hazardous footing on wet rock in waterfall sections during the rainy season. Safety guidance emphasizes group travel with knowledgeable guides, appropriate navigation and communication equipment, weather planning, and avoiding separation from the group.

== Seasonality, difficulty, and common experience ==
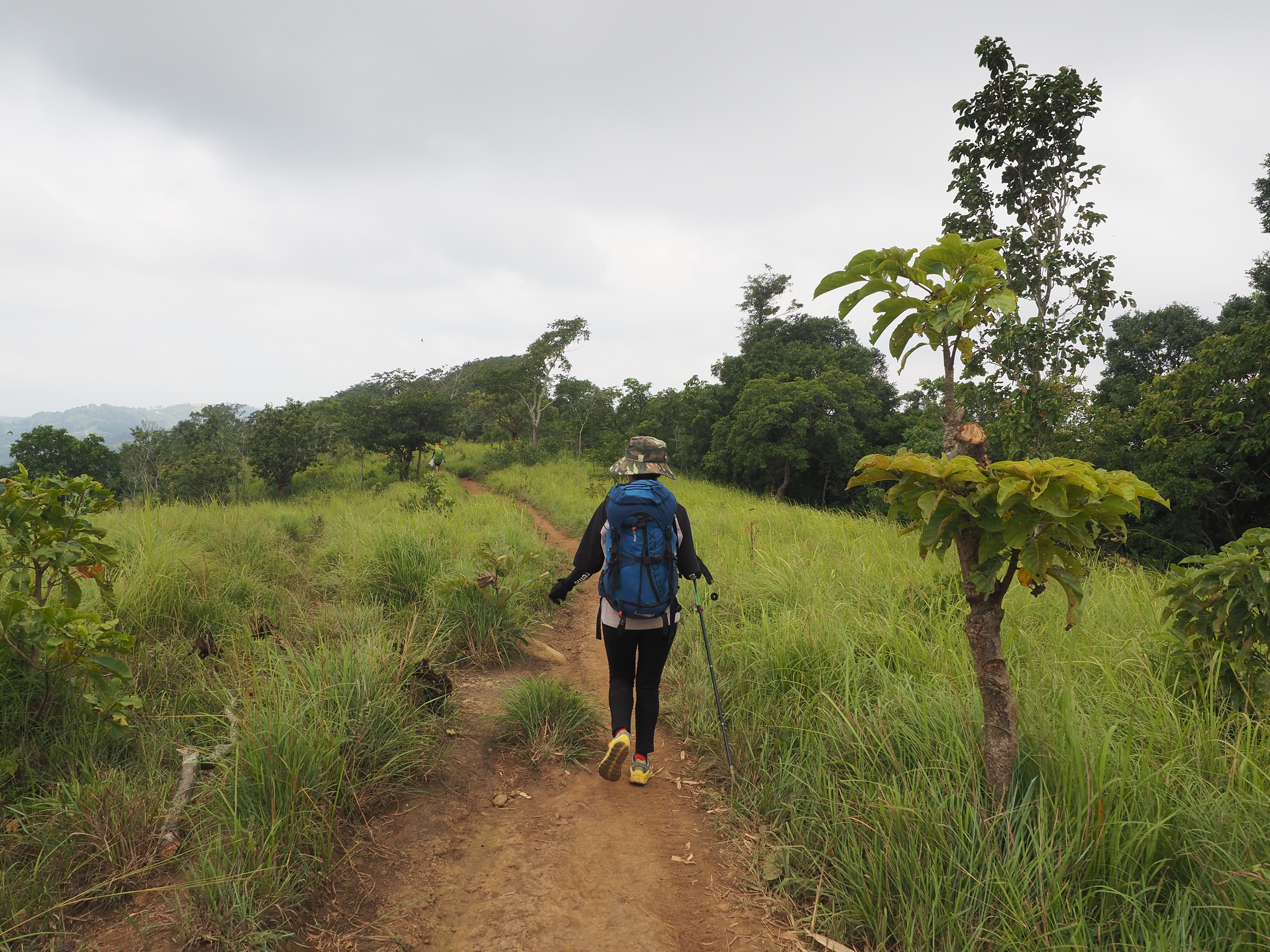
Hiking across grass hills during the rainy season.

The rainy season is associated with greener landscapes and higher stream and slip hazards. The dry season is associated with easier trail conditions, with heat and wildfire risk emphasized in guidance. The route is often treated as moderate to challenging, with weather and hydrology as key variables affecting risk and pacing. Commonly cited highlights include exposed ridgelines with broad views, contiguous grass hills interspersed with three-needle pine stands near Tà Năng, and cooler stream valleys toward the Phan Dũng end where groups rest and camp in permitted areas.

== Environmental impacts and local communities ==
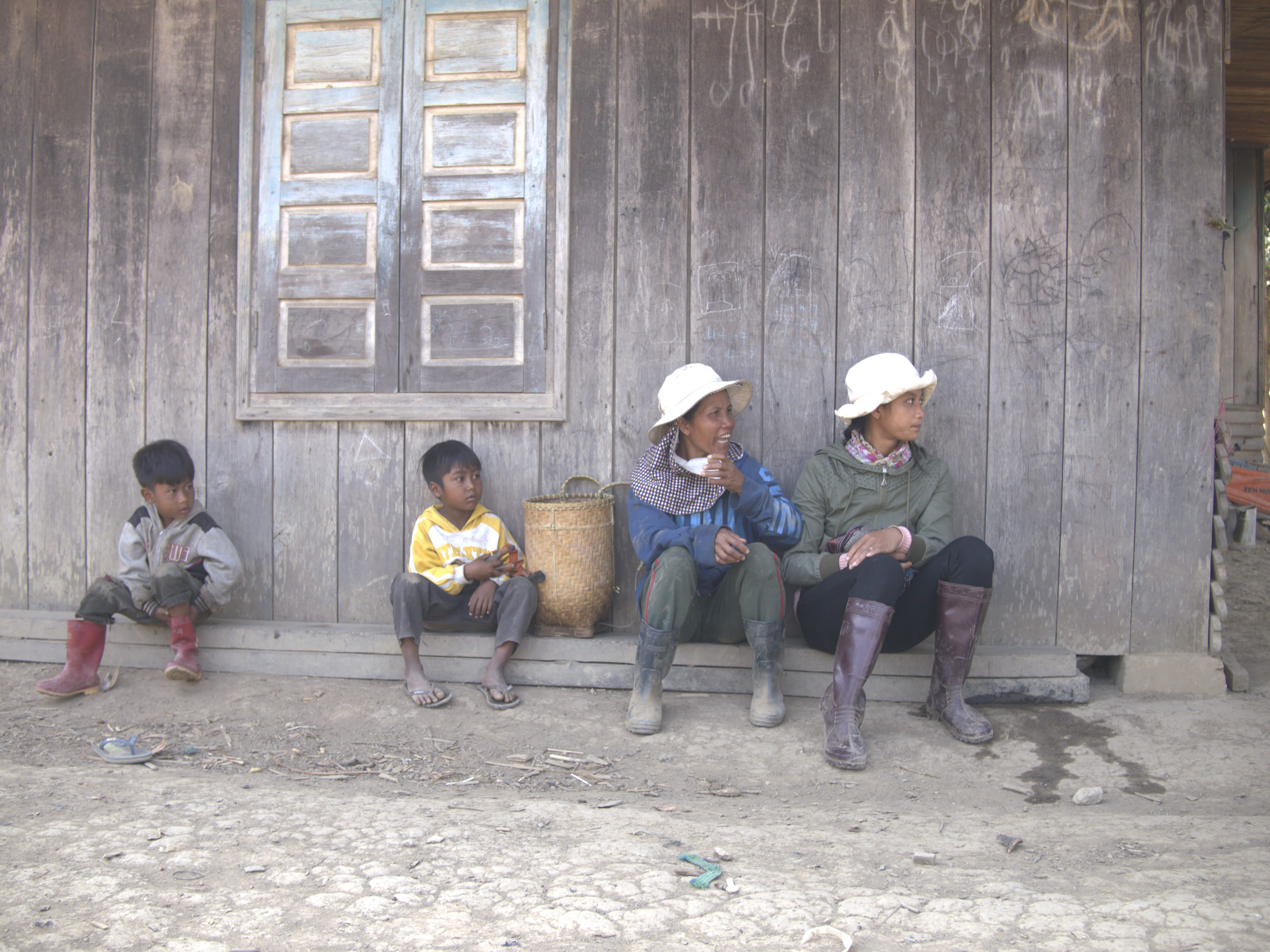
Ethnic minority communities live in areas associated with the route corridor.

Growth in unmanaged trekking during 2016–2018 increased concerns about litter, wildfire risk, and accidents, alongside official responses such as signage, checkpoints, and safety communication and training involving local residents and guides. The 2023 pilot program emphasized local participation, rescue capacity, and forest protection within a sustainable adventure tourism approach.

Farms and settlements are present near stream corridors in the lower-elevation portions of the route area, including communities associated with ethnic minority groups such as the Raglai. Ethnic minority communities in the Lâm Đồng highlands include the K'Ho.

== Notable incidents and events ==
- October 2017: A trekker died after being swept away by floodwaters while crossing a stream in Bình Thuận province.
- May 2018: A trekker went missing and was later reported found dead in the Lao Phào waterfall area after a multi-day search operation involving officials and volunteers.
- April 2019: A fatality was reported near Đạ Quyn along the route corridor.
- March 2020: Trekking activity on the route was reported temporarily suspended during early COVID-19 prevention measures.
- September–October 2023: A pilot program tied to the "Sea and Flower Journey" tourism linkage cited tiered route options and expanded coordination measures.

== In popular culture ==
In 2020, a film project titled Tà Năng – Phan Dũng drew controversy for referencing real-life trekking incidents. The project later changed title to Rừng thế mạng, with later coverage discussing release scheduling.

== See also ==
- List of national parks of Vietnam
- Trekking
- Sustainable tourism
- Bidoup–Núi Bà National Park
- Phước Bình National Park
- Lâm Viên Plateau
