= Đức Trọng district =

Coordinates: 11.6972°N 108.3161°E

Đức Trọng district Huyện Đức Trọng
- District
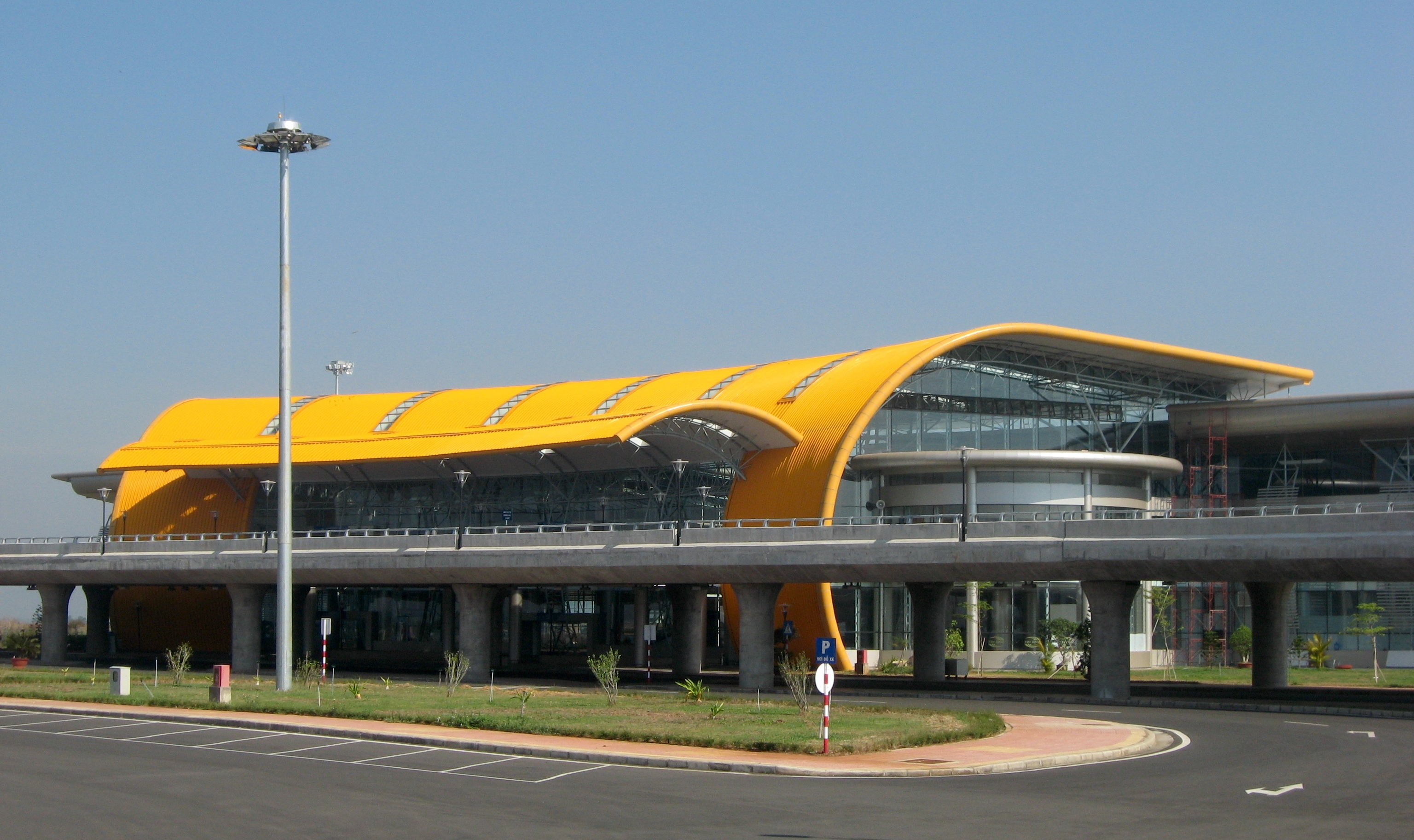
- Liên Khương Airport

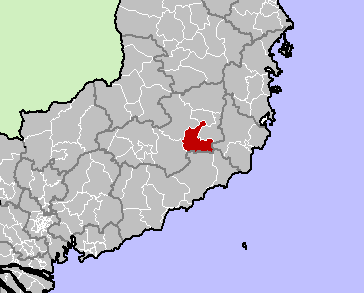
- Location in Lâm Đồng province
- Country: Vietnam
- Region: Central Highlands
- Province: Lâm Đồng
- Capital: Liên Nghĩa

Area
  - Total: 348 sq mi (902 km^{2})

Population (2003)
  - Total: 161,232
- Time zone: UTC+7 (Indochina Time)

Đức Trọng is a former rural district (huyện) of Lâm Đồng province in the Central Highlands region of Vietnam. Đức Trọng is located at the center of Lâm Đồng Province. Liên Nghĩa Town (thị trấn), the district capital, is 30 km to the south of Đà Lạt. National Route 20 (Đà Lạt–Ho Chi Minh City) and National Route 27 (Đà Lạt–Ban Mê Thuột) run through the district. It also has two highways connecting Đà Lạt and the central coastal provinces.

The district is subdivided into one town (Liên Nghĩa) and 13 communes (xã): Hiệp Thạnh, Hiệp An, Liên Hiệp, Bình Thạnh, N'Thôl Hạ, Tân Hội, Tân Thành, Phú Hội, Ninh Gia, Tà Hine, Ninh Loan, Đà Loan, and Tà Năng.

Pongour Waterfall, well known as "Seven-Floor Fall" (Thác Bảy Tầng) or "the First Waterfall of the South" (Nam thiên đệ nhất thác) is an attractive tourist site of Đức Trọng.

As of 2003 the district had a population of 161,232. The district covers an area of 902 km^{2}. The district capital lies at Liên Nghĩa.

== Climate ==
Climate data for Liên Khương, Đức Trọng District, elevation 961 m (3,153 ft)
Month	Jan	Feb	Mar	Apr	May	Jun	Jul	Aug	Sep	Oct	Nov	Dec	Year
Record high °C (°F)	31.5 (88.7)	33.2 (91.8)	34.6 (94.3)	33.5 (92.3)	33.0 (91.4)	33.9 (93.0)	31.1 (88.0)	31.3 (88.3)	32.5 (90.5)	30.8 (87.4)	31.1 (88.0)	30.6 (87.1)	34.6 (94.3)
Mean daily maximum °C (°F)	26.2 (79.2)	28.0 (82.4)	29.0 (84.2)	29.6 (85.3)	28.7 (83.7)	27.6 (81.7)	26.9 (80.4)	26.8 (80.2)	26.8 (80.2)	26.6 (79.9)	26.4 (79.5)	25.8 (78.4)	27.4 (81.3)
Daily mean °C (°F)	19.5 (67.1)	20.5 (68.9)	21.7 (71.1)	22.7 (72.9)	22.8 (73.0)	22.4 (72.3)	21.8 (71.2)	21.8 (71.2)	21.6 (70.9)	21.2 (70.2)	20.7 (69.3)	19.9 (67.8)	21.4 (70.5)
Mean daily minimum °C (°F)	14.9 (58.8)	15.5 (59.9)	16.6 (61.9)	18.5 (65.3)	19.5 (67.1)	19.5 (67.1)	19.1 (66.4)	19.0 (66.2)	18.8 (65.8)	18.0 (64.4)	17.0 (62.6)	15.8 (60.4)	17.7 (63.9)
Record low °C (°F)	6.8 (44.2)	6.4 (43.5)	10.2 (50.4)	12.9 (55.2)	10.9 (51.6)	15.9 (60.6)	15.4 (59.7)	15.3 (59.5)	12.8 (55.0)	10.4 (50.7)	9.1 (48.4)	7.9 (46.2)	6.4 (43.5)
Average precipitation mm (inches)	4.8 (0.19)	14.1 (0.56)	50.8 (2.00)	131.4 (5.17)	223.6 (8.80)	176.2 (6.94)	195.6 (7.70)	176.4 (6.94)	270.0 (10.63)	228.9 (9.01)	87.7 (3.45)	33.5 (1.32)	1,592.9 (62.71)
Average rainy days	1.0	1.2	4.2	10.5	17.7	19.6	21.5	22.0	22.8	18.5	9.0	3.9	153.4
Average relative humidity (%)	73.7	71.1	70.7	75.4	81.3	84.6	85.3	86.0	87.2	85.7	81.5	77.4	80.0
Mean monthly sunshine hours	245.2	243.6	255.4	221.2	188.7	153.1	151.7	141.6	138.7	153.3	170.8	205.2	2,279.7
Source: Vietnam Institute for Building Science and Technology

== See also ==
- Ta Nang-Phan Dung trail
