= Lâm Hà district =

Coordinates: 11.833°N 108.167°E

Lâm Hà district Huyện Lâm Hà
- Rural District
- Seal

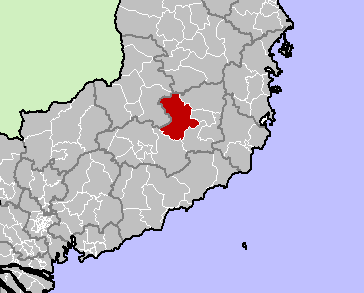
- Location in Lâm Đồng province
- Country: Vietnam
- Region: Central Highlands
- Province: Lâm Đồng province
- Capital: Đình Văn

Government
  - Type: District People's Committee

Area
  - Total: 378 sq mi (979 km^{2})

Population (2003)
  - Total: 135,809
- Time zone: UTC+7 (Indochina Time)

Lâm Hà is a rural district of Lâm Đồng province in the Central Highlands of Vietnam.

== History ==
Lâm Hà is the destination of Hanoians going to reclaim virgin soil, showing in its name: Lâm is from Lâm Đồng and Hà is the short form of Hanoi.

== Culture ==
Lâm Hà is the home of a famous product: King- offering bananas named Laba. A tourist attraction here is Elephant Falls (Vietnamese: Thác Voi).

== Geography ==
As of 2003, Lâm Hà rural district had a population of 135,809. The district covers an area of 979 km².

The district capital lies at Đình Văn township.

== See also ==
- Đức Trọng district
