= Đan Phượng =

- Commune
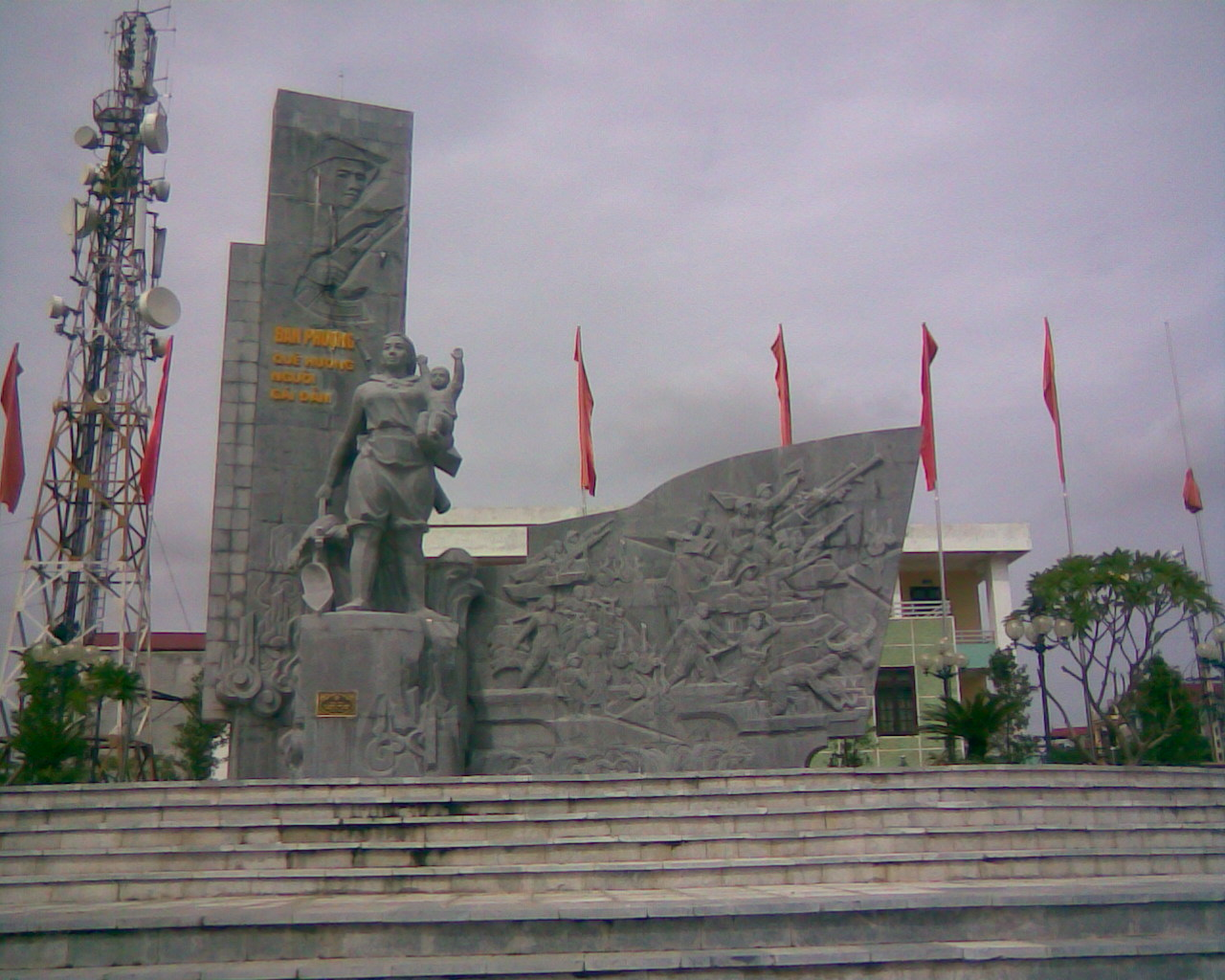
- Monument to the Women of Đan Phượng at National Route 32
- Interactive map of Đan Phượng
- Coordinates: 21.082620829646388°N 105.67286193194741°E
- Country: Vietnam
- Region: Red River Delta
- Municipality: Hanoi
- Administrative headquarters: No. 105 Tây Sơn Street

Area
  - Total: 15.3 km^{2} (5.9 sq mi)

Population (2025)
  - Total: 47,629
  - Density: 3,112/km^{2} (8,060/sq mi)
- Website: danphuong.hanoi.gov.vn

Đan Phượng is a commune in the municipality of Hanoi, Vietnam.

On 16 June 2025, district-level administrative units nationwide ceased to operate.

On the same date, the Standing Committee of the National Assembly of Vietnam issued Resolution No. 1656/NQ-UBTVQH15 on the arrangement of commune-level administrative units in Hanoi in 2025. Under the resolution, the entire area and population of Phùng township and Đồng Tháp, Song Phượng, Thượng Mỗ, and Đan Phượng communes, formerly part of Đan Phượng district, were merged to form a new commune named Đan Phượng.
