= Ba Vì, Hanoi =

Ba Vì
- Commune
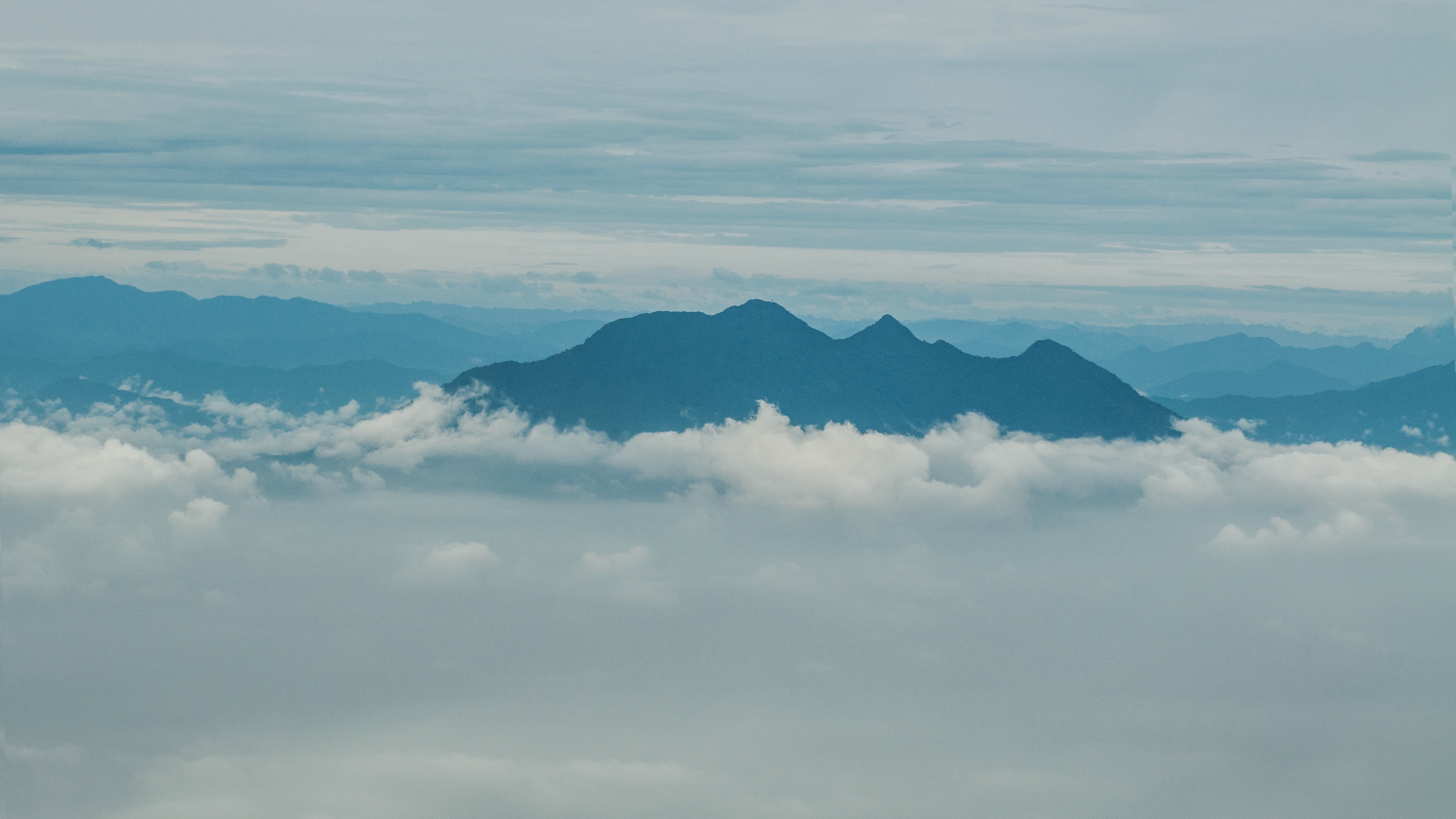
- Ba Vì Mountain
- Interactive map of Ba Vì
- Coordinates: 21.071436540143022°N 105.3207935557177°E
- Country: Vietnam
- Region: Red River Delta
- Municipality: Hanoi
- Administrative headquarters: Đồng Tiến Hamlet

Area
  - Total: 81.27 km^{2} (31.38 sq mi)

Population (2025)
  - Total: 26,651
  - Density: 328/km^{2} (850/sq mi)
- Website: bavi.hanoi.gov.vn

Ba Vì is a commune in the municipality of Hanoi, Vietnam. It is also the commune-level administrative unit with the largest natural area in the municipality.

On 16 June 2025, district-level administrative units nationwide ceased to operate.

On the same date, the Standing Committee of the National Assembly of Vietnam issued Resolution No. 1656/NQ-UBTVQH15 on the arrangement of commune-level administrative units in Hanoi in 2025. Under the resolution, the entire area and population of Ba Vì and Khánh Thượng communes and the remaining area of Minh Quang Commune, formerly part of Ba Vì district, were merged to form a new commune named Ba Vì.
